= Mike Douglas =

Entertainer, talk show host (1920–2006)

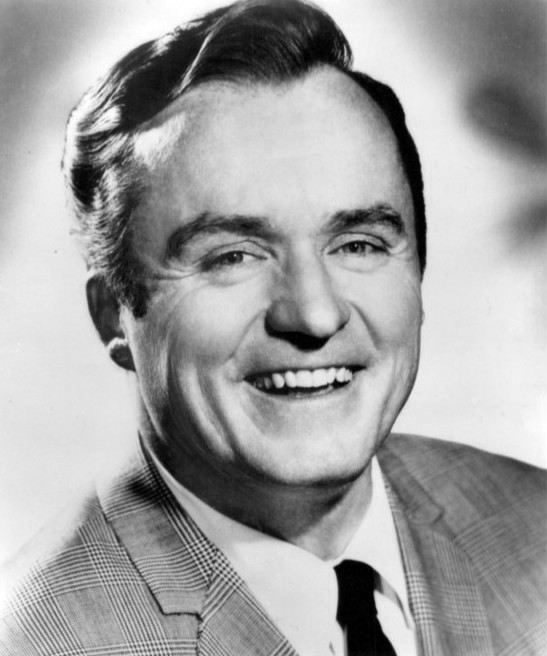
- Douglas in 1966
- Born: Michael Delaney Dowd Jr. August 11, 1920; Chicago, Illinois, U.S.
- Died: August 11, 2006 (aged 86); Palm Beach Gardens, Florida, U.S.
- Resting place: Riverside Memorial Park, Jupiter, Florida, U.S.
- Occupations: Singer; entertainer; talk show host; actor
- Spouse: Genevieve Purnell (m. 1943)
- Children: 3
- Website: Official website

Michael Delaney Dowd Jr. (August 11, 1920 – August 11, 2006), known as Mike Douglas, was an American big band singer, entertainer, television talk show host of The Mike Douglas Show, and actor.

== Early life ==
Dowd was born in Chicago, Illinois. His birth year has been called into question, with years ranging from 1920 to 1925 having been given as his year of birth at some point. His family later moved to Forest Park, Illinois, where he attended Proviso Township High School, but left the school after his second year. After that, he began singing as a choirboy.

== Career ==
By his teens, Dowd was working as a singer at nightclubs and on a Lake Michigan dinner cruise ship. He was a "staff singer" at the Oklahoma City radio station WKY. After serving in the U.S. Navy in World War II on a munitions ship, he resumed his performing career as a staff singer for WMAQ-TV in Chicago. He moved to Los Angeles. He was on the Ginny Simms radio show. After that, Douglas joined the big band of Kay Kyser as a singer.

Although big band swing faded from popularity, Kyser had to continue performing due to contractual obligations, and continued to log a few hits with Douglas, including two notable hits, "Ole [or Old] Buttermilk Sky" in 1946 and "The Old Lamp-Lighter" the following year. Kyser was responsible for giving Douglas his show business name, and Douglas continued to perform with the band until Kyser retired in 1951 due to health problems. In 1950, he provided the singing voice of Prince Charming in Walt Disney's Cinderella.

In 1953, Douglas was host of Showcase, a weekly program on WGN-TV in Chicago, and he sang on The Music Show on the DuMont Television Network. In 1957 Douglas was one of the Band Singers on Dennis James' Club 60 a daily talk show on NBC out of Chicago. Douglas and James remained lifelong friends, with James occasionally serving as a co-host on "The Mike Douglas Show" in Los Angeles in the 1970s.

Then living in Burbank, California, Douglas tried to keep his singing career going in the late 1950s working as house singer for a nightclub and traveling to perform elsewhere. By the middle of the decade, rock and roll and doo wop had taken over the charts, which left many older performers without jobs. In the leanest years, Douglas and his wife survived by successfully flipping their Los Angeles homes.

== Talk show ==
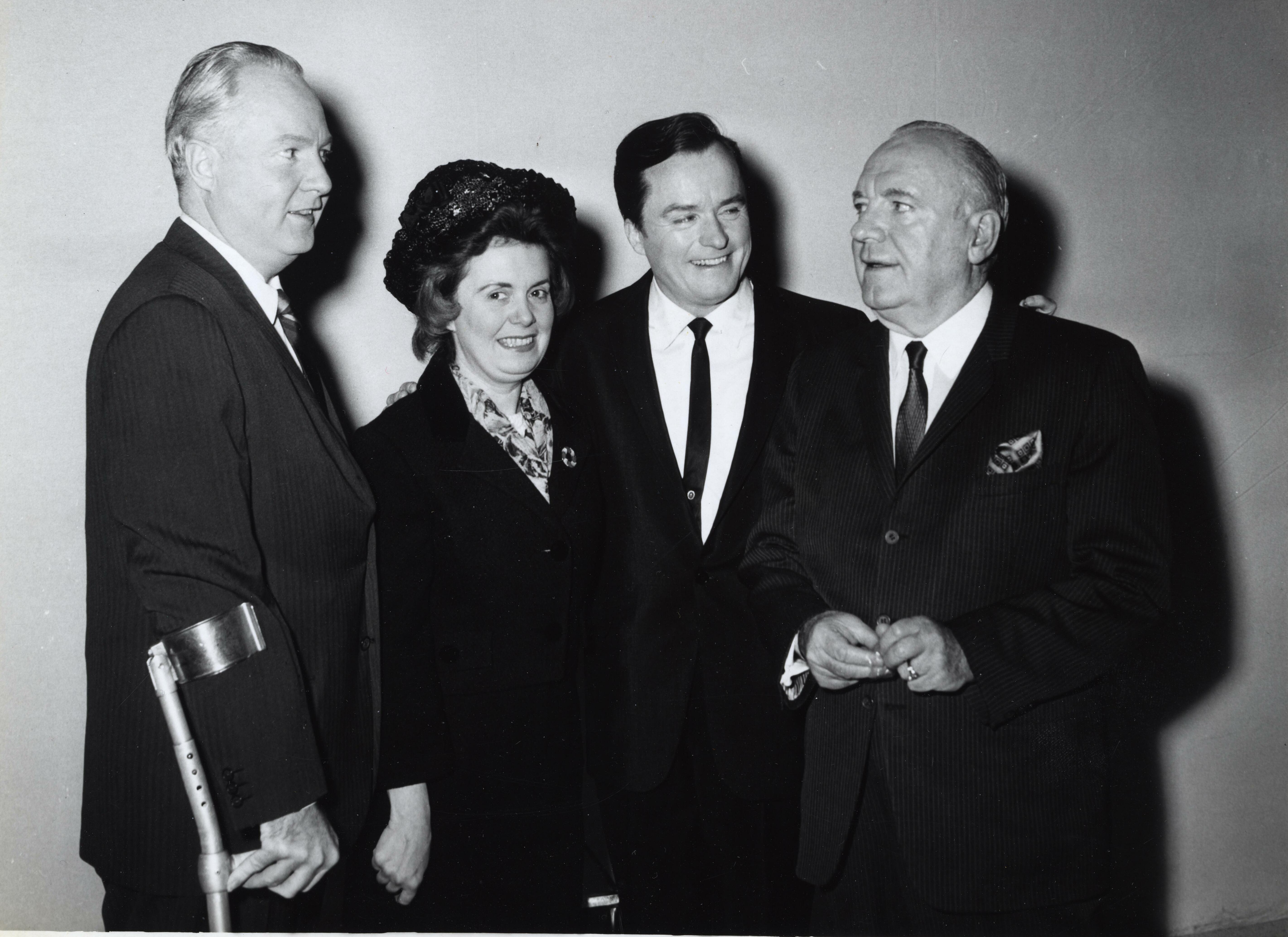
Left to right: Boston Mayor John F. Collins, Mary Collins, Douglas, and actor Pat O'Brien in the 1960s

Douglas next appeared in 1961 in Cleveland, where a onetime Chicago colleague hired him for $400 a week as an afternoon television talk-show host at KYW-TV. The Mike Douglas Show rapidly gained popularity, and ultimately, national syndication in August 1963 on other stations owned by KYW-TV's parent company Westinghouse Broadcasting. The show was broadcast live on KYW-TV in its city of origination, but this practice ended in 1965 after guest Zsa Zsa Gabor used the phrase "son of a bitch" when referring to stand-up comedian and comic actor Morey Amsterdam of The Dick Van Dyke Show.

Both Douglas and his program relocated to Philadelphia in 1965 after Westinghouse Broadcasting moved KYW-TV's operations to that city, the result of a Federal Communications Commission-ordered reversal of Westinghouse's 1956 station ownership swap with NBC. The Mike Douglas Show aired its first Philadelphia-based show on August 30, 1965; the former KYW-TV in Cleveland, which is now NBC-owned WKYC, continued to carry the program for many years afterward. The format called for Douglas to invite guests to appear as co-hosts for the week; they would be on the show for all five weekdays. Guests ranged from Truman Capote, Richard Nixon, Jerry Lewis, and Edward Everett Horton to The Rolling Stones, Herman's Hermits and Kiss, with an occasional on-camera appearance by Tim Conway (who would later be discovered at WJW-TV, also in Cleveland). Moe Howard of The Three Stooges was a guest several times, with a pie fight inevitably happening at the end of the interview, and platform speaker on nonverbal communication (body language) Dr. Cody Sweet. The show helped introduce entertainers such as Barbra Streisand and Aretha Franklin.

After the move to Philadelphia, Douglas also attempted to revive his own singing career, logging his lone Top 40 single as a solo artist, "The Men in My Little Girl's Life", in 1966. The single's success made him record an album with the same name which reached the Top 50. By 1967, The Mike Douglas Show was broadcast to 171 markets and 6,000,000 viewers each day, mostly women at home. It earned $10.5 million annually from advertisers, while its host was paid more than $500,000. In 1967, the program received the first Emmy Award for Individual Achievement in Daytime Television from the National Academy of Television Arts & Sciences. At the peak of his career, he was earning $2 million a year.

The afternoon show was usually quiet with an eclectic mix. This approach would occasionally lead to confrontation, such as when soul singer James Brown took offense at racially charged comments from talk-show host/producer David Susskind, who wondered on-air why Black students often did not mix with white students, even after civil rights legislation and advances in integration. It got heated when Brown defended those who chose to learn first about themselves, having been systematically denied to do so, for centuries.

Douglas never "muzzled" his guests, as flamboyant as many were. Pop-soul co-host Sly Stone's hyperactive behavior clashed with the calm deportment of Muhammad Ali in a 1974 show. Little Richard, a 1950s rock-and-roll originator, was on a serious comeback bid in 1969, and his many appearances with Douglas gave him a boost. In 1970, Douglas hired rocker Bobby Darin as co-host, just after Darin had emerged from seclusion and radically changed his image from lounge entertainer to folk artist. He told Douglas that he would sing his greatest hit "Mack the Knife" only if he could rewrite a verse to fit his updated sensibilities. Douglas was partially successful in expressing the wishes of fans, who demanded the original Bobby Darin.

Douglas invited John Lennon and Yoko Ono on the show to co-host for a full week in 1972, and there were some awkward moments with Yoko's avant-garde art displays and some politically radical guests who were John and Yoko's friends at the time. Chuck Berry, Ralph Nader, Jerry Rubin, Bobby Seale, Yellow Pearl (Nobuko JoAnne Miyamoto, Chris Iijima), Vivian Reed, David Rosenboom and George Carlin appeared on the program.

In July 1978, the talk show's home base was transferred to Los Angeles, where it remained until going off the air in 1981. Near the end of its run, the series switched to a traveling roadshow format and became The Mike Douglas Entertainment Hour, but this change failed to boost falling ratings. After a 20-year run, Westinghouse canceled the Mike Douglas program and replaced him with singer and TV personality John Davidson. The John Davidson Show, using a similar format, had a comparatively brief run, ending in 1982.

After Douglas's Westinghouse series was canceled, Douglas hosted CNN's Los Angeles-based celebrity interview show, People Now, taking over the hosting duties from Lee Leonard. He was replaced in January 1983 by WTBS personality Bill Tush.

== Other notable achievements ==
Douglas became a local cultural icon in Philadelphia, often inviting prominent players from the city's professional sports teams to be guests on his show (he had a particular affinity for the city's pro football team, the Philadelphia Eagles, constantly referring to the team as "Our Eagles", and he could often be seen in attendance at Eagles' home games, especially whenever they appeared on Monday Night Football). He also assisted in mayor Frank Rizzo's campaign against derisive jokes often told by outsiders about the city, acting as chief spokesperson for the "Anti-Defamation Agency" Rizzo had set up for this purpose. He also held a landmark interview with Dr. Martin Luther King that revealed his wisdom about civil rights and his prophetic stance on the Vietnam war.

In February 1976, Hollywood recognized Douglas's contribution to television, honoring him with a star on the Hollywood Walk of Fame located on Hollywood Boulevard.

Douglas sang "The Star-Spangled Banner" before the first Philadelphia Phillies game at Veterans Stadium on April 10, 1971, also sang the national anthem prior to a Cincinnati Bengals–Miami Dolphins playoff game on December 23, 1973, and before the NHL All Star Game at the Philadelphia Spectrum on January 20, 1976. He wrote two memoirs: My Story (1979) and I'll Be Right Back: Memories of TV's Greatest Talk Show (1999). He also wrote a cookbook, The Mike Douglas Cookbook (1969), featuring recipes from him, his family, and the show's guests. 40 years after Douglas began his talk show at KYW-TV, his granddaughter Debbie Voinovich Donley designed successor WKYC's new broadcast facility on Lakeside Avenue, completed in 2002. In 2007, a new documentary film Mike Douglas: Moments and Memories was shown on PBS stations. The Lily Tomlin comedy The Incredible Shrinking Woman shows the dwindling Pat Kramer appearing on Douglas's show, where he sings "Little Things Mean a Lot" in her honor.

== Personal life ==
Douglas married Genevieve, the marriage producing three daughters: Kelly and twins Michele and Christine, and he had several grandchildren and great-grandchildren.

Douglas developed prostate cancer in 1990, but after surgery, he was cancer-free and remained in good health until almost the end of his life. He died unexpectedly on August 11, 2006, his 86th birthday, at Palm Beach Gardens Medical Center in Palm Beach Gardens, Florida. In media reports, he was usually cited as being five years younger than his true age. He said he was 36 years old, instead of 40, when he got his show.

Although the exact cause of his death was not revealed, his widow Genevieve told the Associated Press that he became dehydrated while golfing a few weeks earlier on a hot Florida summer day. Douglas was treated at a hospital following this episode, but he was apparently unable to recover. His body was interred in Riverside Memorial Park cemetery in Martin County, Florida.

== Legacy ==
The Broadcast Pioneers of Philadelphia posthumously inducted Douglas into their Hall of Fame in 2006.

== Other television and film appearances ==
- 1969: The Mike Douglas Christmas Special
- 1971: The Last Valley as Stoffel (uncredited)
- 1976: Gator as The Governor
- 1981: Greatest American Hero; guest appearance in the season two premiere
- 1982: Knots Landing; episode: "Svengali"
- 1983: The Love Boat as Marv Mason
