= Minn Matsuda =

Asian American activist

- Born: 31 May 1911
- Died: 6 August 2003 (aged 92)
- Works: Asian Americans for Action

Shizu "Minn" Matsuda (1911-2003) was a Japanese-American activist and a co-founder of Asian Americans for Action (also known as "AAA" or "Triple A"). In 1969, inspired by the Black Power Movement, Matsuda and her friend, Kazu Iijima (1918-2007), a survivor of the World War II Japanese internment camps, co-founded the New York-based AAA, one of the first U.S. East Coast pan-Asian organizations promoting awareness of pan-Asian identity and heritage, civil rights, and equality.

== Early life and career ==
Matsuda was born in Seattle, Washington in 1911. Her maiden name was Utsunomiya. At some point, she moved to the San Francisco Bay Area and earned an art undergraduate degree at the California School of Arts and Crafts in 1933. She received some recognition for her watercolor paintings. She worked for a time for the Works Progress Administration (WPA) in the federal art project. In Salt Lake City, Utah, Matsuda managed to find a job creating ads for a retail store despite hostility toward people of Japanese heritage. Her artwork from the WPA was included in an exhibit at the Utah State Arts Center in 1939.

== Pan-Asian activism and AAA leadership ==
Matsuda and Iijima, the co-founders of the AAA, had met in California prior to World War II and the upheaval caused by Executive Order 9066. Unlike Iijima, Matsuda avoided the mass incarceration of Japanese families since she had moved inland to Utah prior to 1942. Nonetheless, to Matsuda, this historic event had a long and strong impact.

Pan-Asian activism began during the 1960s, inspired in part by the Black Power movement. In 1968, the term "Asian American" was brought up by an academic in the West Coast, followed by multiple Asian-American movements throughout 1968-69. In 1969, Matsuda and Iijima co-founded AAA in New York City inspired by the Black Power movement. The women originally conceived of an organization focused on Japanese-American identity, but were convinced by Iijima's son, Chris Iijima, to make it pan-Asian, that is meant to bring shared political and cultural identity across all Asian people. The AAA was community-based and aimed to promote Asian heritage, especially amongst the younger population. Its scope expanded from awareness of cultural heritage to civil rights, women's rights, and equality. The AAA emerged as part of Asian-American activism during the late 1960's by increasing political participation in marginalized communities. Like many organizations, it brought isolated efforts to a more unified approach. Bearing the fruits of its work; it contributed to the expansion of civil rights efforts.

The organization's first meeting was held in New York City, April 6, 1969. The first members of AAA included activist Yuri Kochiyama. According to Iijima, AAA began with "two old ladies sitting on a park bench worrying about their children's future." Matsuda was approximately 58 and Iijima about 51 when they set up the organization. By that time, both women had already been involved in pro-Asian movements for many years. To enlist members, the women approached persons of Asian descent at rallies protesting the Vietnam War. The war, which they considered an act of American aggression, became the first cause they espoused. They also protested the renewal of the United States-Japan Security Treaty which allowed for American military bases on Japanese soil, including Okinawa. The AAA continued to evolve and became known as "Union of Activists" in 1976. However, as many more radical Asian American organizations began to push further by challenging government policies, confronting political positions, and acting in more militant ways, many members left. As a result, the pan-Asian organization dissolved within a decade. Nevertheless, AAA had an ever-lasting impact on Asian American activism, which became increasingly professionalized with focuses including cultural/heritage preservation and civil rights.

According to firsthand accounts, many AAA protestors faced adversity, including hatred and racial hostility during this period and during protests; through this, they gained a stronger desire to fight against social injustice.

== Later life and death ==
Matsuda was a witness of the 9/11 attack on the World Trade Center. From her ninth-floor residence, she personally witnessed the second jet striking the tower. In an interviewed piece by Chisun Lee, Matsuda recounted her shocking experience and its connection to the traumatic memory of the Japanese-American Internment during World War II. She believed that the post-9/11 government put Muslim Americans under scrutiny, just as it had with Japanese and Japanese Americans after Pearl Harbor. Matsuda raised concerns of how the political climate might have normalized and perhaps promoted racial discrimination.

Matsuda died on August 6, 2003, at the age of 92.
