= Harvey Dong =

American ethics professor

- Occupation: Lecturer
- Spouse: Beatrice Dong

Academic work
- Discipline: Ethnic Studies
- Institutions: University of California, Berkeley

Harvey Dong is an ethnic studies professor at the University of California, Berkeley. He grew up in Sacramento, California, and was raised by his grandmother and immigrant mother. He was an active member of the Asian American Political Alliance (AAPA) and the Third World Liberation Front (TWLF). He continues his work by writing and researching the evolution of these entities. He has won awards for his writing, such as the Independent Publisher Award for the US West-Pacific - Best Regional Non-fiction for the book Mountain Movers: Student Activism & the Emergence of Asian American Studies.

== Early life ==
Harvey Dong was born in downtown Sacramento, where he lived with his parents, grandmother and cousins. During his early childhood he lived close to Sacramento's Chinatown. His family was well known in the community as his grandfather ran a popular herb shop and volunteered at the Chinese language school. At the herb shop, members of the community would visit to send and receive letters from China. His grandfather passed before he could meet him, but all the hard work he did for the community lived on. He and his family later moved to a small predominantly white suburban neighborhood near the Sacramento River, when his father purchased a home using GI benefits. By the time Dong reached high school, the neighborhood's population was around 50% Asian. Although he had never felt any disdain from his neighbors, whenever he visited surrounding neighborhoods he would be called racial slurs. Many of his cousins were going through the same situation as well, but had a different reaction than he had. While their goal was to let it roll off their backs, Dong felt frustrated. Within the first week of middle school he had experienced threats, racist comments and taunts from his fellow schoolmates. In order to stop this repeated cycle he reacted with violence, which then caused the other students to never bother him again.

=== Education ===
He enrolled at the University of California, Berkeley in 1966 with the intention to enter the business field by getting a degree in economics. At the same time, he made the decision to join the Reserved Officers' Training Corps (ROTC). Growing up with family members who had joined the military, Dong always assumed that he would join too. During his time in the ROTC he was expected to wake up at 5:00 am, take part in drills, practice shooting and dismantling his rifle. What later made him change his perspective on continuing to take part in the military was the Vietnam War. He had also witnessed various racist incidents during his time there. Many students in his dormitory had been discussing the war and through these open discussions, he was able to gain a deeper understanding of what the war represented. This prompted him to go to his local bookstore to continue his research. After learning about the Gulf of Tonkin and Vietnam, he came to the conclusion that the United States should not be fighting in the Vietnam War. By the time his freshman year of college was coming to an end he had attended various anti-war rallies, demonstrations, and marches. When it became known to various conservative Asian Americans in his dorms that he was participating in anti-war rallies, they continuously threatened him. In October 1967, he participated in Stop the Draft week to protest against the Oakland Army Induction Center. He went on to attend Stop the Draft week part two in spring of 1968.

Later in 1968, Harvey Dong became interested in volunteer work after seeing a flier stating the need for volunteers to tutor immigrant youth in San Francisco's Chinatown. Every Wednesday, Dong and his friend would drive from Sacramento to San Francisco to tutor. This volunteer group was brought together by UC Berkeley's Chinese American Organization. During his time in San Francisco, he would visit the office of the Intercollegiate Chinese for Social Action (ICSA) to discuss the current strikes happening at San Francisco State. These meetings were also a way for Dong to learn about poverty within the community and how the University needed to act on it. He began to attend more political rallies, functions and speeches where he saw solidarity amongst the attendees.

=== Beatrice Dong ===
His wife, Beatrice Dong, was among the first batch of students at UC Berkeley to take the Asian American studies program established by Harvey Dong and the TWLF in 1970. The pair married in 1974 in San Francisco City Hall. She led the 1974 Jung Sai Garment Workers Strike and was subsequently arrested.

Harvey Dong and his wife, Beatrice Dong, were also part of the I-Hotel protests in San Francisco.

She was paralyzed from the neck down at the age of 29 after a bullet struck her in 1981.

== Political activism ==
He was an active member of Asian American Political Alliance and worked in the struggle to save the International Hotel in 1977. While he contributed to several organizations, he is known for his work in establishing the Asian Community Center alongside fellow AAPA activist and participating in the I-Hotel and TWLF protests.

Dong joined AAPA in the fall of 1968. The goal of AAPA was political education and advancement of the movement among Asian people and the organization used the concept of "Asian American" as a vehicle for political activism on and off the UC Berkeley campus and Asian pan-ethnic self-determination. Within AAPA, he advocated the organization adopted the approach of "problem posing" to rais[e] political consciousness". The organization's leadership was focused on the idea of creating an Asian American studies that served student and community needs. While a part of AAPA, Dong attended and facilitated in events such as "The Yellow Symposium ('The Asian Experience in American/Yellow Identity')". This event "helped chart the direction for future Asian American activism. Asian American identity, Asian American Studies, community service, Asian student movements..."

Some of the most notable work AAPA did was their solidarity activism with the Black Panther Party, specifically through their activism in the "Free Huey" movement. Dong participated in multiple "Free Huey" rallies as a member of AAPA in addition to the collaborative events with Black Power and the Student Nonviolent Coordinating Committee (SNCC). Additionally Dong was heavily active in the organization's anti-war activism and in the Chinatown anti-poverty protests. AAPA ceased activity in 1970.

The Asian Studies Field Office changed its name to the Asian Community Center (ACC) in 1970. After the end of AAPA, Dong and other Asian American activists centered their work at the ACC. The Asian Community Center provided multiple services, including a youth program, food program, and film services for the elderly.

Through the ACC, Dong worked at Self-Help for the Elderly, which was a community organization catered towards Asian senior citizens. Through Self-Help, Dong served as the main organizer for the "Team 40" youth group, which was centered on the restoration and renovation of Old Chinatown Lane.

Alongside other AAPA activists, Harvey Dong was also a co-founder of Wei Min She, an Asian American anti-imperialist activist organization. Similarly to Everybody's Bookstore, Wei Min She was physically headquartered in the I-Hotel.

In addition his involvement in the Asian American Political Alliance (AAPA), he took part in the Third World Liberation Front in 1969, which was largely a student-led movement that sought to establish ethnic studies departments and programs in universities and other academic institutions. The Third World Liberation Front was a coalition of Asian, Black, Latino, and Native American student groups and activists at the University of California-Berkeley. The ultimate goal of the TWLF was to see their lived experiences with oppression and systemic racism centered in academia and higher education. Dong participated in the protests, particularly the TWLF strikes near Sproul Hall on the Berkeley campus. While working with the TWLF, Dong learned how to organize strike logistics, respond to mass arrests, negotiate demands, and deal with the press.

While in university, Dong became close friends with Black Panther activist and FBI informant Richard Aoki. Eventually serving as the executor of his will and estate after Aoki's death.

=== The I-Hotel protests ===
The I-Hotel protests are considered to be pivotal in the Asian American movement and Asian American activism in the 1960s. The International Hotel or I-Hotel was the resident of 150 elderly Filipino and Chinese tenants. It was the location of a nine year campaign and protests against the gentrification and encroachment of the neighboring Financial District in San Francisco. These protests utilized student and community grass-roots organization and is considered a milestone in housing advocacy. Located in the Filipino American enclave of Manilatown, the I-Hotel and surrounding areas were subject to the encroachment throughout the 1960s, turning much of the residential Manilatown into "higher use" developments. Walter Shorenstien, the President of the Milton Meyer & Company released plans to demolish the I-Hotel in order to use the land for a multi-level parking lot.

From 1968 to 1977, community action and protests resulted in eviction postponements, court stays, and local political intervention. Participants of the protests and community action included student activists from the Third World Liberation Front strikes of San Francisco State College and UC Berkeley. Harvey Dong participated in marches to the offices of Shorenstein protesting in support of the I-Hotel tenants in 1969.

His involvement in these protests for the preservation of the International Hotel in Manilatown, resistance to gentrification of ethnic neighborhoods, the housing rights of the ethnic residents of the hotel, as well as immigrant labor rights.

=== Eastwind Books ===
After the protests and activism surrounding the I-Hotel, Harvey Dong, with nine other activists and peers, purchased Everybody's Bookstore, which was located in the basement of the I-Hotel. The purchase of Everybody's Bookstore was the last of AAPA's activities. It was considered to be the first Asian American bookstore in the United States. It also served as a key provider of reading materials for activists and community members, particularly during the nine-year I-Hotel struggle. Everybody's Bookstore was evicted alongside the tenants in 1977.

Harvey and Beatrice Dong purchased the Berkeley location of the Hong Kong owned Eastwind Books. Their bookstore, Eastwind Books, was considered a hub for local Asian American activism and art. It was one of the first Asian American books stores in the United States. The bookstore is considered to be a local landmark for Asian American and ethnic studies. Eastwind Books served as a cultural community center for Asian Americans and activists in the Bay Area. The bookstore also served as a physical archive for signs, banners, oral histories, and other artifacts from Asian American political movements in Berkeley and the San Francisco Bay Area.

Eastwind Books was used by Yuri Kochiyama, an Asian American and political prisoners activist, as her address and place of business. With many inmates and political prisoners sending letters meant for Kochiyama to Eastwind Books. His bookstore hosted Black-Panthers co-founder, Bobby Seale. This event was used to introduce Southeast Asian refugee student activists to real-world activism. As well as promotional work for the book, Black Against Empire: The History and Politics of the Black Panther Party by Joshua Bloom and Waldo E. Martin. Eastwind Books also hosted an event for Al Robles, Filipino American poet and community activist. It was also the location of Brian Ang's first poetry book release.

One of Eastwind Books largest clients was the UC Berkeley Ethnic Studies Library. The bookstore was known for their catalog of Asian American literature, ethnic studies, Chinese-language books, and books on United States-Chinese relations. It was considered "long time staple" of the ethnic studies community.

Eastwind Books closed down in 2023. With increased costs, the rise of online retail options like Amazon, and lease issues in addition to gentrification listed as reasons for the closing. Their lease expired in April 2023, and the couple did not renew their lease. An online version of Eastwind Books still exists and is active as of May 2025.

=== Later work and activism ===
Harvey Dong is a member of the University of California, Berkeley faculty, within the Ethnic Studies and Asian American & Asian Diaspora Studies department. He was a featured speaker at the "Victory is in the Struggle: The Scholar-activism of Carlos Munos Jr", which was an event put on by the American Cultures Center at UC Berkeley on September 24, 2024. The showcase was on display at the UC Berkeley Ethnic Studies Library throughout the 2024 Fall Semester.

=== Pro-Palestine extra credit controversy ===
The "Asian American Communities and Race Relations" course, taught by Harvey Dong, was caught in controversy. Teaching aide Victoria Huyun offered students taking the course extra credit for attending pro-Palestine events and protests, in particular a student-led walkout of the UC Berkeley campus. This extra credit opportunity was eventually prohibited by Berkeley administrators.

== Writings ==
Harvey Dong has many published works, ranging from scholarly research articles to his dissertation. He has also edited two books. His work focuses on Asian American Political Activism with an emphasis on bringing light to the history and impact of the Third World Liberation Front. As a member of AAPA and an active participant in the TWLF student strikes, Dong provides personal insight into the history of these events while still acting as an active scholar and conducting research with all his publications. Harvey Dong's writings continually highlight the importance of historical accounts, especially regarding taking action in the present.

=== The Origins and Trajectory of Asian American Political Activism ===
In working towards his PhD in Ethnic Studies, he wrote his dissertation: The Origins and Trajectory of Asian American Political Activism in the San Francisco Bay Area. It was published in 2002 and focuses on the transition of student activism at the beginning of TWLF to the formation of community-based organizations such as the Kearny Street-International Hotel block. Dong's goal with this thesis was to analyze Asian America during 1968–1978 in the San Francisco Bay Area. His dissertation focuses on the theory and practice of campus politics and new activism, the early origins of Asian American activism, the International Hotel Movement, the Lee Mah-Jung Sai Worker strikers, Chinatown, and geopolitics.

Harvey Dong's dissertation focuses greatly on locational context for political change as it discusses student, community activism, and the catalyst for social change campus movement happened to be. In his discussion, Dong analyzes many writings on Asian American history, such as:

- Legacy to Liberation: Politics and Culture of Revolutionary Asian Pacific America by Fred Ho
- Asian Americans: The Movement and the Moment by Steve Loui and Glenn Omatsu
- Asian Americans: An Interpretive History by Suchenfs Chan
- Strangers from a Different Shore by Ronald Takaki
- The contemporary Asian American experience: Beyond the Model Minority by Timothy Fong
- The Asian American Movement by William Wei
- Pedagogy of the Oppressed by Paulo Freire

Moreover, Dong places an emphasis on personal stories from those who were involved in the day-to-day grassroots movement, as he claims the lack of information and historical analysis of the ten-year period his dissertation explores (1968–78) is due to historical erasure. Researching those who had firsthand experience is a method to combat the historical erasure Asian Americans often face. Additionally, Dong examines three phases of early Asian American activism: emergence of politically progressive Asian Americans, activism in the struggle for democratic rights through community residents' participation, and the significance of the eviction and loss of the International Hotel as a center of Asian American activism, and its timing with global changes.

=== Mountain Movers ===
Harvey Dong is one of the editors for Mountain Movers: Student Activism & the Emergence of Asian American Studies, which won the Independent Publisher Award in 2020. He wrote this book alongside Russel Jeung, Karen Umemoto, Eric Mar, Lisa Hirai Tsuchitani, and Arnold Pan. The book was written as a collaboration between the Asian American Studies program at UC Berkeley, SF State, and UCLA. The book illustrates how nine students at these institutions shaped Asian American studies, as well as explores their background and education that led to their impact in their communities. Mountain Movers recognize how students were agents for change and how empowering they were for the Asian American community.

Dong's contribution focuses on the power of student activism during those times, especially in regards to shaping higher education by demanding changes in the curriculum. The student's activism and mobilization led to the establishment of Asian American Studies at UC Berkeley, SF State, and UCLA. Dong's philosophy accentuated the importance of listening and working with communities (the people who faced the struggles) to create solutions to structural problems. The efforts of these students are a clear reflection of the impact that student and community activism can have on societal progress.

=== Power of the People Won't Stop: Legacy of the TWLF at UC Berkeley ===
Harvey Dong is the author of Power of the People Won't Stop: Legacy of the TWLF at UC Berkeley, which explores those who participated in the TWLF student strike in 1969, as well as those who were inspired by it, eventually leading to the creation of his department of ethnic studies at UC Berkeley. The book addresses the stories of those who participated in the strikes to accurately shine a light on the TWLF strikes, given that their history is often overlooked. Like in his dissertation, Dong emphasizes the importance of preserving and sharing the narrative of multiracial student activism in events such as the Third World Liberation Front student strike.

His book highlights how multiracial solidarity was a catalyst for change as African American, Asian American, Chicano, and Native American students all worked together in the TWLF. The TWLF advocated for ethnic studies and representation in higher education, and its success exemplified the power of cross-cultural collaboration. Furthermore, Dong discusses the importance of documenting and communicating the stories of TWLF. These stories are important for these communities, their history, and the importance of social activism.

Given that the TWLFs' strikes led to the creation of ethnic studies departments, Dong further asserts the importance of this department to understand the history of these communities, and for Asian Americans, knowing their own history can foster a sense of identity and purpose to utilize in the battle against current social injustices.

=== Transforming Student Elites Into Community Activists: A Legacy of Asian American Activism ===
One of Harvey Dong's known articles is Transforming Student Elites Into Community Activists: A Legacy of Asian American Activism which was published in Stevie Louie and Glenn K. Omatsu's "Asian Americans: The Movement and the Moment" (2001). It once again discusses the creation of the Ethnic Studies program, as a result of the Third World Strike, but it now places an emphasis on the aftermath, and the continuation of this program can have on societal transformations.

In his article, Dong argues that ethnic studies is a starting point for a broader societal change while advocating for students to utilize their education beyond personal goals, participate in community studies, and advocate for change in oppressive systems. During his own activism, Dong was a strong proponent of working with the community and learning by working with the community, which he emphasizes that students should do.

=== Other writings by Harvey Dong ===
As a Professor at UC Berkeley, he has published several research papers, which include the following:

- Ethnic Studies on its Fiftieth Anniversary (2019)
- Richard Aoki's legacy and dilemma: Who do you serve? (2013)
- Richard Aoki (1938–2008): toughest oriental to come out of West Oakland (2009)

=== Works about Harvey Dong ===
- Inspiring a Son by Seth Sandronsky
- Interview with Harvey Dong, 2018, UC Berkeley Asian American Political Alliance Oral History Project by Elaine H Kim
- "A chapter ends for this historic Asian American bookstore, but its story continues" by NPR

== Legacy ==
Harvey Dong has impacted Asian American Politics in many different ways. He and his wife, Beatrice Dong, owned a bookstore called Eastwind Books of Berkeley for forty-one years. Eastwind Books of Berkeley was very impactful in the Asian American Community, especially around the Bay Area. It served as a beacon of education and solidarity as it stocked many books focused on social justice and ethnic studies, as well as giving a voice to Asian American writers. Even though the bookstore is closed, its legacy continues with the Eastwind Books Multicultural Organization online and as a reminder of the power books can have in education and social movements.

As a lecturer at UC Berkeley, Dong continues to push students to desire to make a change in society. His ideology of working within the community continues to shine through in his research articles, oral interviews, and his continuing involvement in higher education. His work in AAPA, in the International Hotel Movement, the TWLF strike, and his books have all been influential in Asian American political history and societal movements. Harvey Dong is one of the major figures spoken about in Asian American history, especially regarding student activism; as an educator and political activist, Dong continues his work towards social progress.
