= Yellow Pearl (band) =

Asian American folk rock band

- Origin: New York City, U.S.
- Genres: Folk rock
- Years active: 1970–1973
- Label: Paredon Records
- Past members: Chris Iijima, Nobuko JoAnne Miyamoto, William "Charlie" Chin

Yellow Pearl were a 1970s folk rock band based in New York City. The band's name is a play on words based on the anti-Asian phrase "yellow peril". Yellow Pearl was a prominent part of the growing Asian American movement in the 1970s, and is often called the first Asian American band. Its members were Chris Iijima (acoustic guitar, vocals), William "Charlie" Chin (acoustic guitar, di zi, vocals) and Nobuko JoAnne Miyamoto on vocals.

== Members ==
Chris Iijima (1948–2005) was a Japanese American raised in New York City. Iijima studied french horn at the High School of Music & Art in Harlem.

William Chin (1944-) is of mixed Chinese, Carib and Venezuelan descent. Chin grew up in Queens and was heavily influenced by his mother and her family's musical traditions, which they brought from Trinidad. He can play banjo, cuatro, auto harp, guitar and di zi.

Nobuko JoAnne Miyamoto (1939-) is a Japanese American from Los Angeles who survived the Internment of Japanese Americans as a child. Originally an actress, she appeared in The King and I (1956) and West Side Story (1961). She was based on the Upper West Side of Manhattan in the early 1970s.

== History ==
Iijima and Miyamoto met in 1969 at a local Asian Americans for Action meeting. The pair wrote their first piece, a protest song against the Vietnam War, and performed together later that year at the 1969 Japanese American Citizens League conference.

Afterwards, Iijima and Miyamoto began writing and performing in New York and California as "Chris and Jo". In 1970, they met Chin, who was working as a backing musician, at a conference of Asian American community groups held by Pace College. Chin was inspired by the duo's performance and asked to join them in a group. Yellow Pearl then met R&B producer Will Crittendon, who produced their first single. "We Are The Children / I'm Alright Jack", which was composed by Nobuko and Iijima.

From 1970 to 1973, Yellow Pearl had gigs at Buddhist temples, churches, colleges, community centers, coffeehouses, rallies, prisons and parks across the United States. With their focus on Asian American activism, the band spread news across the country during a whirlwind of grassroots activism that had begun in the 1960s.

In 1972, the Basement Workshop published a large compilation of illustrations, writing and music inspired by and named after Yellow Pearl. Miyamoto and Iijima also performed "We Are the Children" as Yellow Pearl on an episode of the Mike Douglas Show which was hosted by John Lennon and Yoko Ono.

Due to the band's associations with local Latino poets, writers and activists, many of their songs were performed in Spanish: Their first recording, a 45 disc with the songs "Venceremos" and "Somos Asiaticos", was released in Puerto Rico by Discos Coqui at the invitation of Pepe y Flora.

Their first album, A Grain of Sand: Music for the Struggle of Asians in America, was released on Paredon Records in 1973. The album is often considered the "first album of Asian American music" due to the political content of the lyrics. A list of contemporary Asian American publications was included in the album's liner notes. The songs on the album discuss Iijima, Miyamoto and Chin's experiences growing up as first generation Asian Americans. Paredon Records donated the album to the Ralph Rinzler Folklife Archives and Collections at the Smithsonian Center for Folklife and Cultural Heritage in 1991.

The group drifted apart after the release of Grain of Sand. Iijima became a teacher at Manhattan Country School and a professor of law in Hawaii. Nobuko returned to southern California and established a multicultural community performing arts organization called Great Leap, Inc in 1978. Chin continued his activism by working at the Museum of Chinese in the Americas in New York's Chinatown and the Chinese Historical Society of America in San Francisco.

Iijima and Nobuko performed together in 2009 for the premiere of Song for Ourselves: A Personal Journey into the Life and Music of Asian American Movement Troubadour Chris Iijima.

== Discography ==
- "We Are The Children / I'm Alright Jack" (1972)
- "Somos Asiáticos / Venceremos" (1973)
- A Grain Of Sand: Music For The Struggle By Asians In America (1973)
