= Everybody's Bookstore =

Everybody's Bookstore was the first Asian American bookstore in the United States. It was established on January 1, 1970 on 840 Kearny Street in the same building as the International Hotel in San Francisco's Manilatown-Chinatown. It served as a central hub of Asian culture, community, and educational resources for the Asian American community. Many of the bookstore’s founders were former members of the Asian American Political Alliance at UC Berkeley, and participants in the Third World Liberation Front's strike at the campus, which demanded the establishment of ethnic studies departments under the control of minorities.

A lasting example of the AAPA’s legacy on the Asian American Movement, the idea for the store was conceived when former AAPA members discussed implementing a way for community members to learn their history and the roles they could play in social change, a vision based on the first point of the Black Panther Party's Ten-Point Program. The name of the bookstore was intended to draw in large numbers of common people, especially those who were curious to learn about Asian American, revolutionary, and radical social topics and politics.

== Literature ==
Books related to Asian American history, Chinese revolutionary politics, and radical social activism from the People's Republic of China, Hong Kong, and Macau were available at the bookstore. It also included newspapers from other social movements, such as Black Panther Party News. Some of the most notable literature sold by Everybody's Bookstore were magazines and books from China which discussed political theory and events that were still relatively unknown in the United States, such as the ideology behind the Cultural Revolution.

== Black Power influence ==
Ideas from the Black Panther Party and the broader Black power movement played a significant role in shaping the purpose of Everybody's Bookstore. One of the bookstore’s goals was to create autonomous institutions independently reliant from the state in order to serve its community through providing access to education on revolutionary political theory, Marxism-Leninism, and Black revolutionary thought, reflecting the Black Power and AAPA ideal that communities ought to have sovereignty over their own social, political, and economic institutions. According to bookstore co-founder and future owner Harvey Dong, one vision of the store was to bring attention to different ethnic studies so that various social movements could learn from one another. Black Panther Party co-founder Bobby Seale once met with a group of Southeast Asian refugee students at Eastwind Books and Arts, the store location’s successor, to promote his book Black Against Empire: The History and Politics of the Black Panther Party, showcasing the culture of solidarity the bookstore fostered. More than just being a shopping location, Everybody’s Bookstore reflected AAPA and the Panthers’ vision of broad, inclusive, community grassroots activism.

== Aftermath ==
Everybody's Bookstore was operated by the Asian American studies program at UC Berkeley, using the street location as its field office. After the disbanding of AAPA, the location was renamed to the Asian Community Center (ACC), which consisted of current and former students as well as new recruits of the community, soon began various "serve the people" programs, similar to the community services of the Black Panthers. Among these were food distribution, screenings for tuberculosis, and an elementary educational summer-day camp.
