= Harlem Nine =

Group of concerned parents

The Harlem Nine were a group of concerned parents, including Mae Mallory, who withdrew their children from schools in Harlem in May 1958 in order to protest unequal standards of education in New York City.

After the decision released by the Supreme Court in Brown v. Board of Education Black communities in northern states began to advocate for integration rather than the de facto segregation within school districts. In New York City, the Harlem mothers that were eventually known as "The Harlem Nine" founded the Parents' Committee for Better Education, alongside attorney Paul Zuber. Mae Mallory filed a suit alongside eight other mothers, aided by Paul Zuber, charging the New York City Board of Education using zoning policies that kept Black children in inferior, segregated schools. The name for the group arose in the newspapers as a comparison to the Little Rock Nine. The group began by sending a letter to then mayor of New York City, Robert F. Wagner Jr. and publicly protesting in front of City Hall on September 19, 1957. During this protest, Ella Baker and fifteen parents negotiated with Mayor Wagner and school board members. The negotiations were unsuccessful.

After the school board failed to make material changes according to the parents, the parents then withdrew their children from school beginning in September 1958. In December 1958, four of the mothers were summoned before Judge Nathaniel Kaplan, and two others were summoned before Judge Justine Polier. While the four mothers were ordered to return their children to school by Judge Kaplan, the two parents who appeared before Judge Polier won their case. Judge Polier found that the New York City Board of Education was offering a poorer quality of education to Black children than white children and that de facto segregation was being practiced by the Board of Education. This set a precedent of district facilitated school transfers in New York City.
