= Kazu Iijima =

Japanese-American activist

Kazu Iijima (1918 - August 26, 2007) was a Japanese American activist and community organizer who was a co-founder of Asian Americans for Action and the United Asian Communities Center.

Born Kazuko Ikeda in California, she grew up in Oakland, and attended college at UC Berkeley. She encountered Marxist critiques of racism through her older sister and the Young Communist League at Berkeley, and became involved in radical politics. By 1938, Ikeda helped to form the Oakland Nisei Democratic Club to encourage more Niseis to take up radical responses to working class issues and racism. Ikeda was still living and working in the Bay Area when Japanese Americans on the west coast were subjected to incarceration under Executive Order 9066. She was first at Tanforan Assembly Center, and then Topaz concentration camp in Utah. She married Tak Iijima in Utah (he had been drafted into the US Army just before Pearl Harbor), and was released to move to Mississippi with him soon after.

After the war, the couple settled in New York City, and began to raise a family. Although Iijima joined the Japanese American Committee for Democracy at that time, it wasn't until the late 1960s that she returned to organizing with the founding of Asian Americans for Action. Along with other Japanese American radicals like Yuri Kochiyama and Shizu "Minn" Matsuda, Iijima built the AAA as a platform for opposing the Vietnam War and for nurturing grassroots Asian American solidarity. The organization was notable as the first group to define itself as pan-Asian, multigenerational, and politically progressive. One of the first actions they took after forming in 1969 was to challenge the Japanese American Citizens League to take a stand against the Vietnam War. The group continued to evolve, changing its name in 1976 to Union of Activists to emphasize political struggle rather than identity, and finally breaking up in 1980 over irreconcilable internal differences.
