= Wei Min She Organization =

American political organization

Wei Min She (WMS) (meaning 'organization of the people' in Chinese) developed in the 1970s as an anti-imperialist organization in the San Francisco Bay area. When WMS first formed, many members identified themselves as Marxists and the group consisted of many different groups of people. They were primarily the working class, students and bourgeois.

The organization focused on Asian American activism, serving as one of the larger Asian American organizations at the time. Asian American activists strived to create their own unique identity through a blend of American and Asian traits. WMS members strived to establish independent cultural identities instead of assimilating into American culture. Asian Americans in WMS believed imperialism was to blame for the oppression of Asians in America. American culture was extended and prominent, and they felt they had to assimilate. Those who did adjust to American culture chose to acculturate, still trying to preserve their Asian identities.

Organizations like WMS were significant at the time because of the increasing numbers of Asian Americans resisting racialization. In the 1970s, the organization commonly met in the International Hotel in San Francisco, the hot spot for Asian American organizations to meet. The International Hotel housed many low-income Chinese and Filipino families, which was a contributing reason for the large Asian community present at the time. WMS used culture as a political tool to overcome western imperialism and to conserve identities. Through entertainment of creating music, lyrics and skits, WMS was able to educate the community about the cultural identity of Asians in America.

== Overview ==
WMS was fueled by the Revolutionary Union in the 1900s, which later became the Revolutionary Communist Party. Participants in the movement somewhat tolerated communism at the time, but were striving to move away from it and more towards anti-imperialism due to colonization.

WMS worked with other organizations to express political radicalism. This concept was first adopted from the Black Panthers. Western imperialism was heavy in Asian countries. As a means of colonization, the United States pushed their power, influence and policies onto Asian countries. WMS was one of the organizations that revealed the connection of racism to western influence in Asia. The organization made decisions by membership and started at a local community level before branching into organizational methods. Rallies, protests and public demonstrations were usually assembled for purposes such as identifying the struggles of unionization. Workers were oppressed by imperialism and strived to establish movements for benefits such as better working conditions.

== Areas of Work ==
Some of the areas in which WMS worked were:

Building labor struggles: Asian workers faced many struggles and were often mistreated because of immigration stereotypes. Immigrant workers had limited work protection compared to other working classes. They also had to work long hours without compensation. Most of them worked extra hours only to get paid the lowest wage. This area of work focused on Asian workers uniting with the larger working class to stand against imperialism and inequality in the workforce.

Student organizing: Events and programs pushed by students were prominent in the Asian American activism movement. WMS helped student organizations raise awareness for ethnic studies and anti-imperialism. With guidance and support, student organizations, a critical body mass, were able to coordinate and execute events important for the progression of the movement.

Fighting for democratic rights: Democratic rights that WMS fought for included but were not limited to health issues, housing concerns, educational rights and equal employment opportunities.

Building relationships with the U.S and China: WMS created environments for open discussion and forums supporting harmony between China and the U.S.

Building struggle against oppression of women: WMS appealed to feminism by wanting equal rights for men and women. The organization emphasized support systems for women in the workforce, women and childcare, and participated in events that raised awareness for those issues.

== Intersectionality ==
During the 1900s, minority ethnic groups collaborated to build unity and solidarity in the community. African Americans and Asian Americans worked through WMS and Black Panthers to resist western imperialism. Organizations like WMS and Asian Americans for Action combined had large numbers, which later inspired other minority ethnic groups. However, the Black power movement had a huge influence on Asian American activism. Asian Americans sought inspiration in the Black power movement as both groups rejected assimilation to the dominant culture of whites. At first, many people were critical of WMS adopting tactics from the Black Panthers because they believed Asian Americans were racist. Alliances formed between the two races at the time showed coexistence, which was supportive for organizations like WMS to build resilience.

It was not uncommon for large minority ethnic groups to live in the same areas as each other, making it easier to support one another. Areas such as Seattle, San Francisco and Los Angeles were prime locations for organizations like WMS to reach out to other communities for solidarity and support. Minority groups united through their experiences of assimilation and resistance to whiteness.

== Rivalries ==
WMS had other organizational rivalries. One was the Red Guard Party, a Chinese-American formed organization. The Red Guard Party was also primarily active in the Asian American Movement. Another organization known as rivalry to WMS was I Wor Kuen. Similar to the Red Guards Party, I Wor Kuen also pulled ideals of political movement from the Black Panthers. The organization also formed community protests centered on Marxist Asian American ideals. Although WMS had rivalry organizations, the majority of Asian American organizations at the time contributed to the Asian American activist movement in compelling ways.
