= Asian American movement =

Sociopolitical movement

The Asian American Movement was a sociopolitical movement in which the widespread grassroots efforts of Asian Americans effected racial, social and political change in the U.S., reaching its peak in the late 1960s to mid-1970s. During this period Asian Americans promoted anti-war and anti-imperialist activism, directly opposing what was viewed as an unjust Vietnam war. The Asian American Movement (AAM) differs from previous Asian American activism due to its emphasis on Pan-Asianism and its solidarity with U.S. and international Third World movements such as the Third World Liberation Front.

This movement emphasized solidarity among Asian people of all ethnicities, as well as multiracial solidarity among Asian Americans, African Americans, Hispanic and Latino Americans, and Native Americans in the United States. This movement was also global in nature, as it occurred against the backdrop of the Vietnam War and Decolonization. There was additionally transnational solidarity with people around the world impacted by U.S. militarism.

Initially student-based, the Asian American Movement emerged simultaneously on various college campuses and urban communities. They were largely concentrated in the San Francisco Bay Area, Los Angeles, and New York City but extended as far as Honolulu. The movement created community service programs, art, poetry, music, and other creative works; offered a new sense of self-determination and Asian American unity; and raised the political and racial consciousness of Asian Americans.

== Background ==
Before the 1960s, Asian immigrants to the United States were often perceived as a threat to Western civilization in what became known as "Yellow Peril". This in turn led to the mistreatment and abuse of Asians in America across generations, through historical incidents like the Chinese Exclusion Act, the Japanese internment camps, and the Vietnam War. Japanese American women formed youth clubs in the 1930s because of a lack of representation in American culture. They and Chinese women in San Francisco Bay faced racial barriers prompted by segregation and chose to create ethnic-specific youth organizations. However, after the Hart–Celler Act of 1965, the increase of immigrants from highly educated backgrounds mainly coming from East Asia led to the perception that Asian Americans were a "model minority." Yet despite these positive assessments, many Asian Americans were still treated as "perpetual foreigners".

The Asian American Movement, which gained prominence from the late 1960s to the mid-1970s, was a social and political movement that united individuals of various Asian backgrounds in the United States to challenge racism and U.S. neo-imperialism. The movement called for reforms in institutions such as universities and championed civil rights, drawing significant influence from the Black Power movement and opposition to the Vietnam War. Key moments in the movement include the Delano Grape Strike and the founding of the Asian American Political Alliance (AAPA) at UC Berkeley. The post-World War II baby boom led to a generation of college-aged Asian Americans in the 1960s and 1970s, many of whom participated in social and political movements such as the Civil Rights Movement, the New Left, the Women's Liberation Movement, and the anti-war movement. Of these, the anti-war sentiment was arguably the most influential to the Asian American Movement due to its uniquely Asian context, which helped foster pan-Asian sentiment across the various Asian American diaspora in the US. Asian American groups started to emerge as second and third-generation Asian American activists moved up in the leadership hierarchy of their interest groups. Many of these new leaders associated with each other while growing up in schools and social groups and chose to focus on their collective identities as Asian Americans rather than their national heritage.

Though activism against discrimination was a part of Asian American culture before the 1960s, it was limited in scope and lacked a wide base of support. Various groups focused on class-based politics aimed to gain better wages and working conditions, homeland politics attempted to bolster the international standings of their nations of origins or free them from colonial rule, and assimilationist politics attempted to demonstrate that Asians were worthy of the rights and privileges of citizenship. These social and political activism instances did not directly address issues facing all Asian Americans at the time. Asian immigrants were largely divided in America; before the 1960s, there was very little solidarity between the various Asian immigrant communities. These disparate groups dealt largely with issues concerning their ethnic communities and conclaves, focusing the majority of their efforts on survival in their exclusionary environment. As a result of these factors, pre-1960s activism never rose to the level of a movement.

However, while the term "Asian American Movement" commonly refers to the pan-ethnic political and cultural activism of the 1960s and 1970s, activism among Asian American communities predates this period. For example, labor activism among Filipino Americans in the 1920s and 1930s demonstrates an earlier legacy of collective resistance, challenging the notion that organized Asian American political activity only emerged during the post-civil rights era.

== Early developments ==
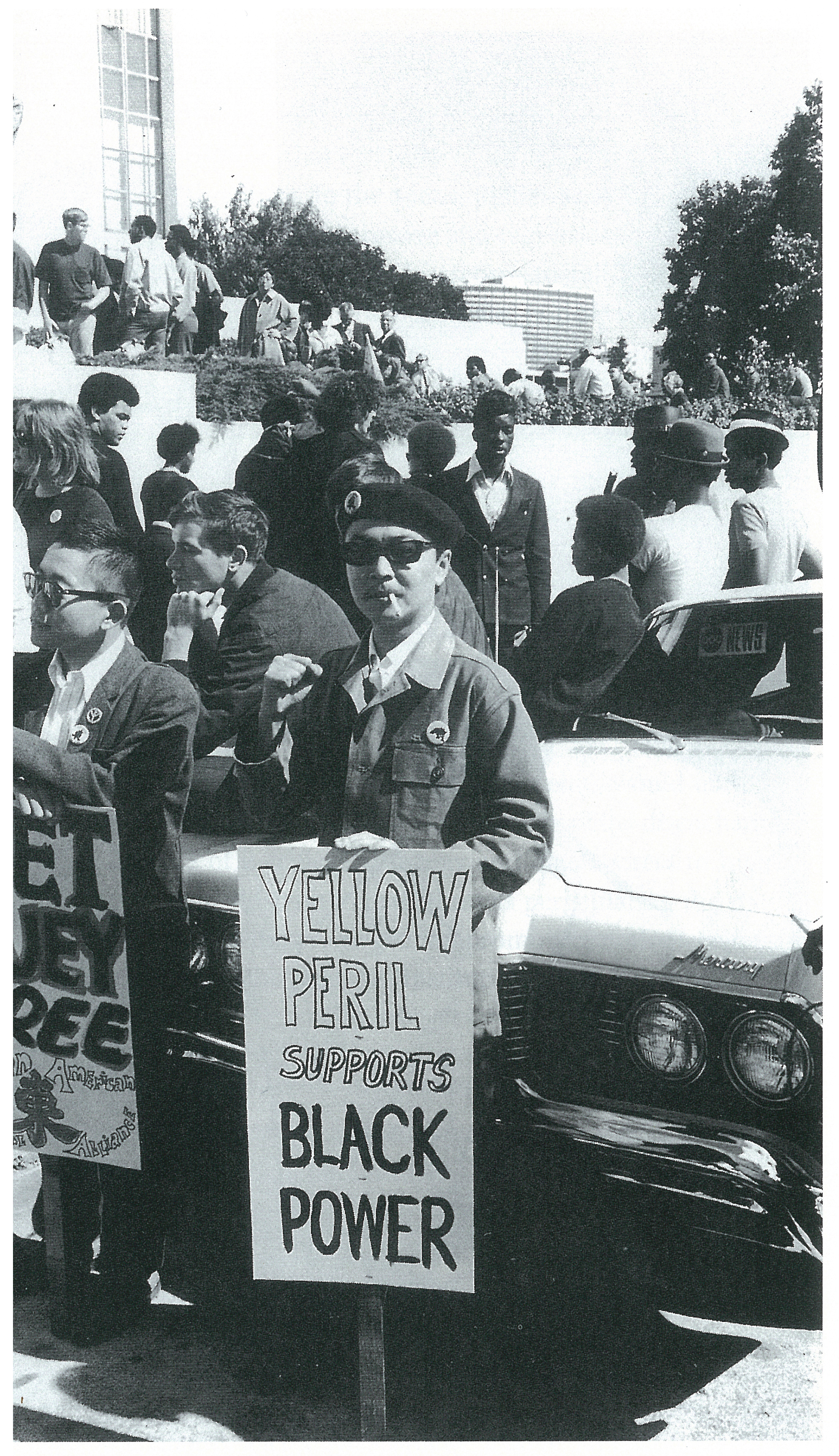
Richard Aoki at a Black Panther Rally, 1968 by Howard L. Bingham

While the Asian American Movement is commonly associated with the 1960s and 1970s, early forms of collective resistance can be traced to the 1920s and 1930s. Filipino laborers, in particular, organized major agricultural strikes in Hawaii and California. The 1920 Hawaiian sugar plantation strike and later farm labor movements, as chronicled in Carlos Bulosan’s The Cry and the Dedication and Ronald Takaki’s Strangers from a Different Shore, illustrate an earlier tradition of Asian American activism centered on labor rights and anti-exploitation efforts.

In the early to mid-1960's, a number of individual Asian Americans activists such as Yuri Kochiyama participated individually in the Free Speech Movement, Civil Rights Movement, and anti-Vietnam War movement. Of these, the anti-war sentiment was arguably the most influential to the Asian American Movement due to its uniquely Asian context, which helped foster pan-Asian sentiment across the various Asian American diaspora in the US. Yuji Ichioka and Emma Gee founded the Asian American Political Alliance (AAPA) in May 1968 at UC Berkeley. Ichioka and Gee coined the term "Asian American" during its founding. Because Asian Americans had been called Orientals before 1968, the formation of the AAPA challenged the use of the pejorative term. According to Karen Ishizuka, the label "Asian American" was "an oppositional political identity imbued with self-definition and empowerment, signaling a new way of thinking." Unlike prior activism the AAM and by extension organizations like the AAPA embraced a pan-Asian focus within their organization accepting members from Chinese, Japanese, and Filipino communities regardless of whether they were born in America or immigrants. The promotion of a pan-Asian ideology brought together the formerly separated groups within Asian American communities to combat common racial oppression experienced in the nation.

The AAPA had chapters at UC Berkeley and San Francisco State University, both of which participated in the 1968 TWLF strikes that succeeded in establishing Ethnic Studies programs at both campuses. These strikes were soon followed by the demonstrations at the International Hotel in San Francisco's Manilatown, in which student activists collaborated with tenants to resist their eviction and the demolition of the property, although they were ultimately unsuccessful in this regard.

The Asian American Movement drew upon influences from the Black Power and anti-war movements, declaring solidarity with other races of people in the United States and abroad. Some promoted the slogan of "Yellow Power," although they were less prone than organizations such as the Black Panthers to encourage conflict with law enforcement. The push for "Yellow Power" during that time period also faced pushback from within the coalition, as Filipinos within the coalition (who identified as "brown" and often had darker skin than their contemporaries of Chinese or Japanese descent) felt it prioritised East Asian groups.

The influence of the Black Power Movement in the efforts of Asian American activists can be seen in several instances. For example, Richard Aoki served as a field marshal in the Black Panther Party prior to helping to form the AAPA. Another organization, Asian Americans for Action (AAA), founded in 1969 on the East Coast by two longtime-leftist Nisei women, Kazu Iijima and Shiz "Minn" Matsuda, was highly influenced by the Black Power Movement and the anti-war movement. Yuri Kochiyama was also one of the organization's members, who, prior to joining the AAA, played an active role in the Congress of Racial Equality and the Organization of Afro-American Unity.

Global decolonization and Black Power helped create the political conditions needed to link pan-Asianism to Third World internationalism. The rate of decolonization increase rapidly in the post World War II era...the 20th century wave of decolonization saw a drop from 153 to 35 colonial dependencies, with 130 decomposition events occurring over 60 years. With the independence of their native countries from European colonialism, Asian Americans were encouraged to fight for their rights in the US. However, segments of the movement struggled for community control of education, provided social services and defended affordable housing in Asian ghettos, organized exploited workers, protested against U.S. imperialism, and built new multiethnic cultural institutions. The Chinese American Museum located in Los Angeles, California is one example of these multiethnic cultural institutions that was influenced by the Asian American Movement.

== Accomplishments of the Asian American Movement ==
The activism of Asian Americans during the Asian American Movement resulted in a variety of social, cultural, and political accomplishments. One of this movement's achievements was the consequence of student activism on college campuses. In solidarity with other ethnic groups, including Native American students, Latino American students, and African American students, Asian American student activists went on strike at colleges and universities including San Francisco State University and University of California, Berkeley in the late 1960s, demanding for courses that integrated the diverse histories and cultures of these various ethnic groups. The outcome of this activism was the establishment of college and university Asian American Studies and Ethnic Studies courses. The AASC (Asian American Studies Center) was founded in 1969 in University of California, Los Angeles campus. This came after the Asian American movement gained prominence in order to petition people to create organizations. In 1971, AASC published Roots: An Asian American Reader. Roots contained the article from U.S. News Reports, which promoted Chinese Americans as “model minorities” and president of San Francisco Stage College during the strike and future Republic U.S. Senator S.I. Hayakaya’s interview. He said about the “positive” wartime relocation because it “gave us a chance to really become Americans, to integrate into U.S. cities, rather than remaining residents of Little Tokyo”. Roots contained an article about model minorities of Chinese origin and S.I. Hayakawa interview about the wartime relocation. The Americans Citizens for Justice (ACJ) was formed in 1983 in response to the murder of Vincent Chin, who was a Chinese American man who was beaten to death in Detroit by two white autoworkers who blamed Japanese imports for job losses. It was to combat racial discrimination more broadly and to fight for justice in Vincent Chin's case. It also created coalitions across ethnic and racial lines and organized rallies, protests, and media campaigns to raise awareness of Chin's case.

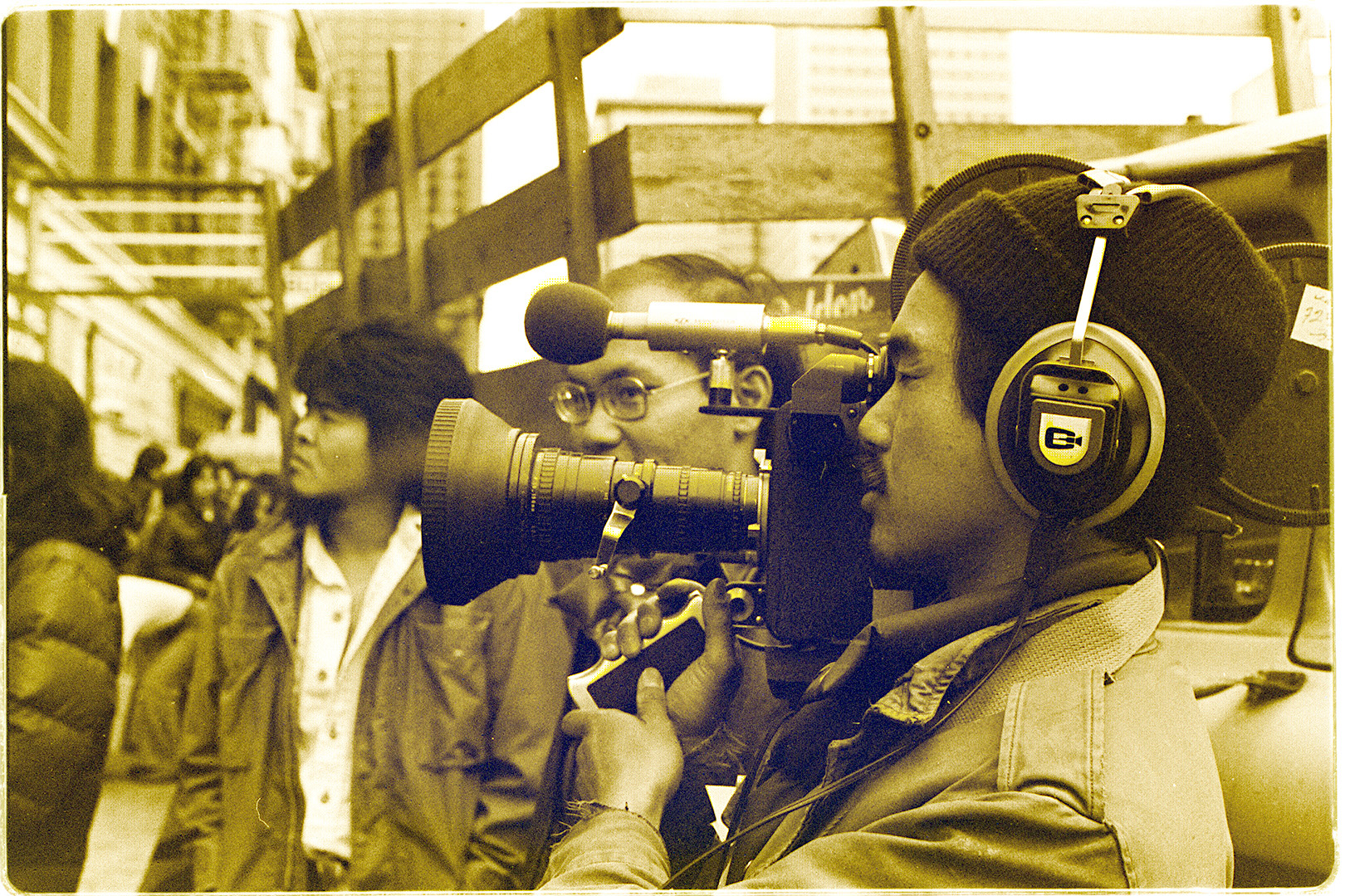
Curtis Choy (filmmaker and member of the Kearny Street Workshop) films his documentary "The Fall of the I-Hotel," August 1977 by Nancy Wong

Another accomplishment of the Asian American Movement was the emergence of cultural institutions that sought to celebrate and authentically represent Asian culture. Community-based arts organizations such as Basement Workshop in New York City and Kearny Street Workshop in San Francisco fostered the artistic expression of Asian Americans and cultivated works of art that depicted Asian American themes. Theater companies were also founded by Asian Americans throughout the United States, including East West Players in Los Angeles, Asian American Theater Workshop in San Francisco, Northwest Asian American Theatre in Seattle, and Pan Asian Repertory Theatre in New York. These theater companies highlighted the works of Asian American writers, directors, actors, and crew members. In addition to community-based arts organizations and theater companies, Asian Americans also founded their own production companies, such as Visual Communications in Los Angeles, to tell authentic Asian American stories.

In addition to the establishment of new college courses and community-based organizations, another outcome of the Asian American Movement was the formation of a pan-ethnic identity and the embracing of Pan-Asianism, an ideology that promotes Asian unity. Before the 1960s, Asians in the United States typically engaged in the process of disidentification, in which different Asian American cultural groups distanced their groups from one another to prevent being grouped or lumped together and to avoid being blamed for the perceived transgressions of another group. However, the Asian American Movement of the 1960s and 1970s featured the collective unity, solidarity, and activism of diverse Asian American groups, including Chinese Americans, Japanese Americans, Korean Americans, Vietnamese Americans, Cambodian Americans, and Laotian Americans. Rather than separating themselves from one another, Asian American activists forged a collective and pan-ethnic identity that encompassed all Asian countries and cultures. The Asian American Movement further impacted Asian identity in terms of a transition in terminology. Prior to the Asian American Movement, Asian Americans were commonly referred to as Oriental in the United States, a derogatory term that was used for not only objects but also people of Eastern culture. The coining of the term Asian American by Asian American activists and University of California, Berkeley graduate students Emma Gee and Yuji Ichioka in 1968 not only replaced the term Oriental, but also helped collectively unite different Asian American groups under a single identity and continues to be used today, representing a long-lasting consequence of the Asian American Movement.

== Legacy ==
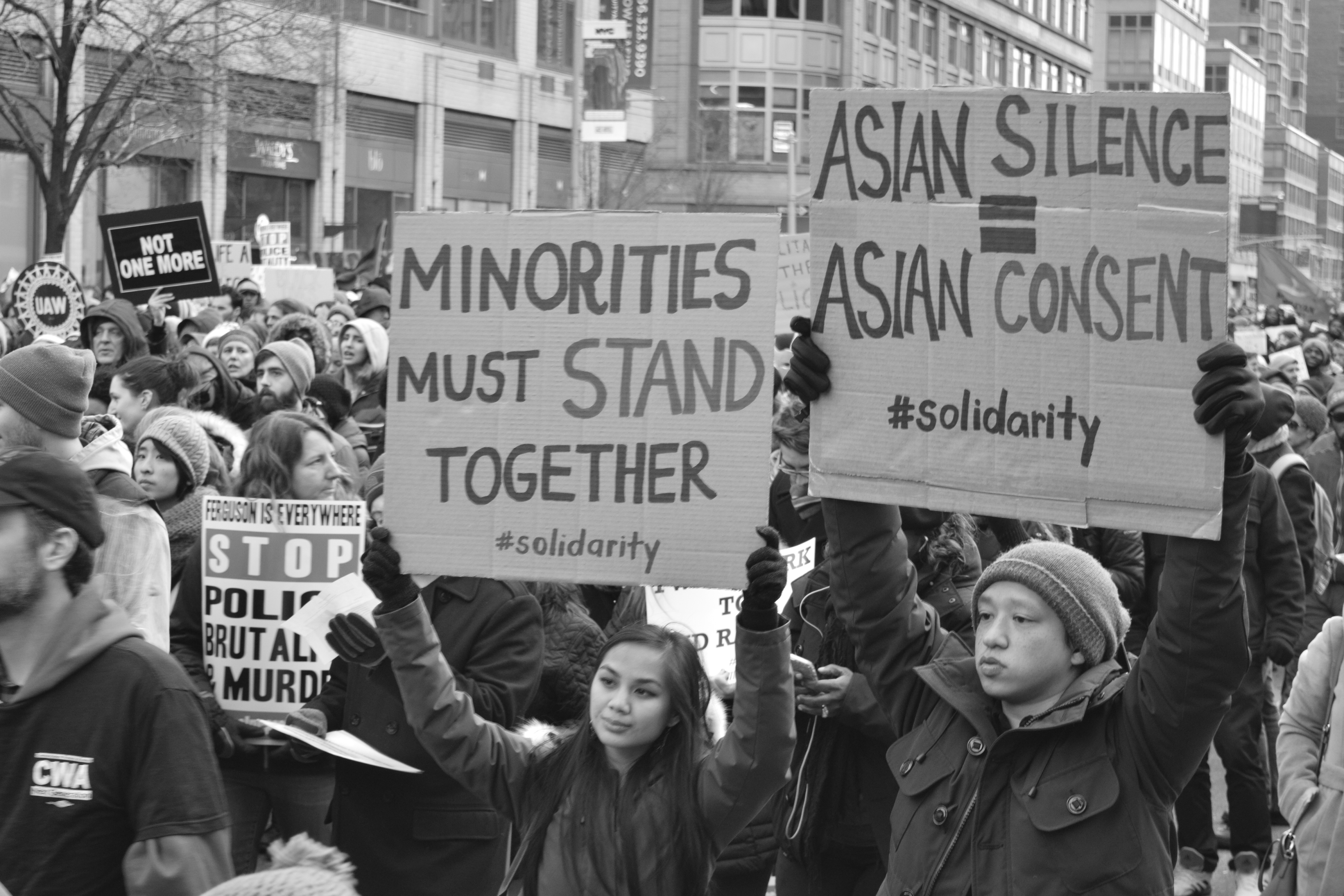
Asian American protestors by Marcela McGreal

The resurgence of Asian American pride came to a swell during the COVID-19 pandemic as a rise in anti-Asian sentiment grew across the globe. Social movements such as #StopAsianHate gained traction online and in news media as elevated reports of racially motivated crimes began to crop up more and more in countries such as the United States, Spain, France, etc. During this time, the Black Lives Matter Movement also comes to a head in 2020 with the murder of George Floyd by a Minneapolis police officer. The intersection of police brutality on African Americans in the United States and rise in anti-Asian violence and racism resulted in strained relations within local and national communities, both urban and rural. Notably, the 2020 pandemic exacerbated already tense racial tensions within the United States that were highlighted through the treatment of African-American and Asian-American people.

Stop Asian Hate became the slogan for a number of rallies and protests of the violence carried out against Asian Americans, Asians, and those of Asian descent across the United States. The root of these demonstrations was a result of the blame directed on those that were seen as connected to China, the alleged origin of the global pandemic. These demonstrations in protest against hate toward Asian Americans were also ignited by the targeted violence and fatal attacks on people of Asian descent across the United States, including an elderly Thai man in San Francisco, California, and six Asian women at a spa in Atlanta, Georgia. These demonstrations, beginning in 2020, signify a contemporary Asian American Movement and the continuation of Asian Americans fighting for social justice in the United States.

== Key Asian American figures ==
- Guy Aoki
- Richard Aoki
- Grace Lee Boggs
- Frank Chin
- Warren Furutani
- Emma Gee
- Aiko Herzig-Yoshinaga
- Fred Ho
- Yuji Ichioka
- Chris Iijima
- Kazu Iijima
- Lawson Fusao Inada
- Yuri Kochiyama
- Stewart Kwoh
- Minn Matsuda
- Dale Minami
- Nobuko JoAnne Miyamoto
- Naomi Osaka
- Al Robles
- Edison Uno
- Amy Uyematsu
- Nellie Wong
- Merle Woo
- Patsy Mink
- Hisaye Yamamoto
- Helen Zia
- Vincent Chin

== Key organizations ==
- American Citizens for Justice
- Asian Americans Advancing Justice - Los Angeles
- Asian American Political Alliance
- Intercollegiate Chinese for Social Action
- I Wor Kuen
- Japanese American Citizens League
- League of Revolutionary Struggle
- Red Guard Party
- United Farm Workers
- Wei Min She Organization
- Kearny Street Workshop
- East West Players
- Asian Americans for Action
- Labor history of the United States
- Delano grape strike
