= Amy Uyematsu =

Japanese-American poet (1947–2023)

- Born: 1947; Pasadena, California, U.S.
- Died: June 23, 2023 (aged 75); Culver City, California, U.S.
- Occupation: Poet

Amy Uyematsu (1947 – June 23, 2023) was an American poet.

== Early life and education ==
Uyematsu was a third-generation Japanese American from Pasadena, California. A graduate of University of California, Los Angeles in mathematics, Uyematsu became active in Asian American Studies in the late sixties. As a college senior, she penned the essay “The Emergence of Yellow Power in America” (Gidra, 1969), an assertion of Asian American identity influenced by the consciousness-raising theories of the Black Power movement. That same year she joined the staff of the newly formed UCLA Asian American Studies Center, where she co-edited the widely-used anthology, Roots: An Asian American Reader (1971).

== Career ==
In the 1970s, Uyematsu was involved in what would become known as the Asian American movement. Modeled after the Black Power movement, it too emphasized racial pride, economic empowerment, and the creation of political and cultural institutions for Asian American people in the United States.

Uyematsu was a public high school math teacher for 32 years, and in the 1990s she began publishing her poetry. In 1992 she won the Nicholas Roerich Poetry Prize for her first book, 30 Miles from J-Town. Her poetry reflects her Japanese American heritage and continues to address issues of racism and social inequities. The Poetry Foundation states, “Uyematsu’s poems consider the intersection of politics, mathematics, spirituality, and the natural world.” In 2012 she was recognized by the Friends of Little Tokyo Branch Library for her writing contributions to the Japanese-American community.

Uyematsu died of breast cancer in Culver City, California on June 23, 2023, at the age of 75.

== Works ==
- 30 Miles from J-Town (1992)
- Nights of Fire, Nights of Rain (1998)
- Stone Bow Prayer (2005)
- The Yellow Door (2015)
- Basic Vocabulary (2016)
- That Blue Trickster Time (2022)
