= Seth Rosenfeld =

American journalist (born 1956)

Seth Rosenfeld (born 1956) is an American journalist. He is the author of Subversives: The FBI's War on Student Radicals, and Reagan's Rise to Power, published in hardback in 2012 by Farrar, Straus and Giroux, and in paperback in 2013 by Picador. Subversives was a New York Times best-seller and won the 2013 Ridenhour Prize for books; PEN Center USA's Literary Award for Research Nonfiction; the National Society of Professional Journalists' Sunshine Award; and the American Book Award from the Before Columbus Foundation.

Rosenfeld was a staff reporter for the San Francisco Examiner from 1984 to 2000, and for the San Francisco Chronicle from 2000 to 2009. Since then his articles have appeared in the New York Times, The Los Angeles Times, The San Francisco Chronicle, Harper's Magazine, and other publications. He is a contributor to the Center for Investigative Reporting and the center's Reveal.

During the 1980s, Rosenfeld's reports for the San Francisco Examiner revealed that poor medical care in California prisons had led to inmate injuries and costly legal settlements. He also disclosed that California's massive prison construction program suffered from construction flaws, cost overruns, and fire and safety problems.

In other articles, Rosenfeld reported alleged links between contra rebels seeking to overthrow the Sandinista government of Nicaragua and a cocaine smuggling ring in the so-called Frogman Case. One story reported that federal prosecutors had returned $36,020 that had been seized as drug funds to one of the Frogman defendants after he claimed it was actually money to support the contras. The articles led to congressional inquiries, and a subsequent report released by the U.S. Department of Justice's Inspector General found that the prosecutors had returned the money at the request of the CIA. According to the Inspector General's report, the prosecutors made no determination as to whether the cash was really contra political money, but sought to eliminate grounds for defense attorneys to ask questions that could reveal the CIA's covert support of the contras. The late journalist Gary Webb cited Rosenfeld as first disclosing this aspect of the contra-cocaine story.

In the 1990s, Rosenfeld's series, Anatomy of a Killing, revealed a systemic breakdown in the San Francisco Police Department's investigation into an officer's fatal shooting of a young man in the back. A second series, Shots Fired, uncovered flaws in the department's investigations into several other police shootings of suspects, and showed that the department's failure to fairly investigate police shootings fell hardest on people who were minorities or low-income. The articles prompted the department to re-examine how it investigated officer-involved-shootings and won a Mencken Award from the Free Press Association.

Rosenfeld received a 1992 George Polk Award for articles in the Examiner revealing internal Dow Corning Corp. documents that showed the company knowingly marketed defective silicone gel breast implants that leaked inside women and caused them to undergo otherwise avoidable surgeries to remove the implants. The articles led the U.S. Food and Drug Administration to impose a moratorium on the use of implants and adopt rules restricting the use of silicone. The Polk judges said, "Rosenfeld's determination to look beyond an obscure verdict and his newspaper's dedication to public service sparked a national debate and prompted reforms that otherwise might not have happened."

In 2002, the Chronicle published Rosenfeld's article, The Campus Files, which was based on FBI records showing that the bureau had engaged in unlawful surveillance and harassment of students, professors and administrators at the University of California in the 1960s. The articles led to inquires by U.S. Senator Dianne Feinstein and a response from then-FBI Director Robert Mueller that the FBI's covert activities at UC were "wrong and anti-democratic." The Campus Files won several national awards.

In Subversives, Rosenfeld expanded his examination of FBI activities at UC during the Cold War, documenting how J. Edgar Hoover's FBI secretly worked to get UC President Clark Kerr fired because bureau officials disagreed with his campus policies; harassed Free Speech Movement leader Mario Savio; and gave personal and political help to Ronald Reagan, who had been a more active FBI informant in Hollywood than previously known.

On August 20, 2012, Rosenfeld's report for the Center for Investigative Reporting alleged that Richard Aoki was an FBI informant who had infiltrated chapters of the Communist Party, the Socialist Workers' Party and, nearly from its inception, the Black Panther Party. In response to a FOIA request by Rosenfeld, it was revealed that a November 16, 1967 FBI intelligence report listed Aoki as an informant with the code number "T-2". FBI agent Burney Threadgill Jr. also said that he worked with Aoki, stating, "He was my informant. I developed him."

== Bibliography ==
- Subversives: The FBI's War on Student Radicals, and Reagan's Rise to Power. Farrar, Straus and Giroux, 2012. ISBN 9780374257002
- San Francisco Chronicle, "Trouble on campus" by Seth Rosenfeld, Chronicle Staff Writer, Sunday, June 9, 2002
- "60s Free Speech Leader got caught in FBI web," San Francisco Chronicle, 10 October 2004, p. A1
