= Richard Aoki =

American educator and activist

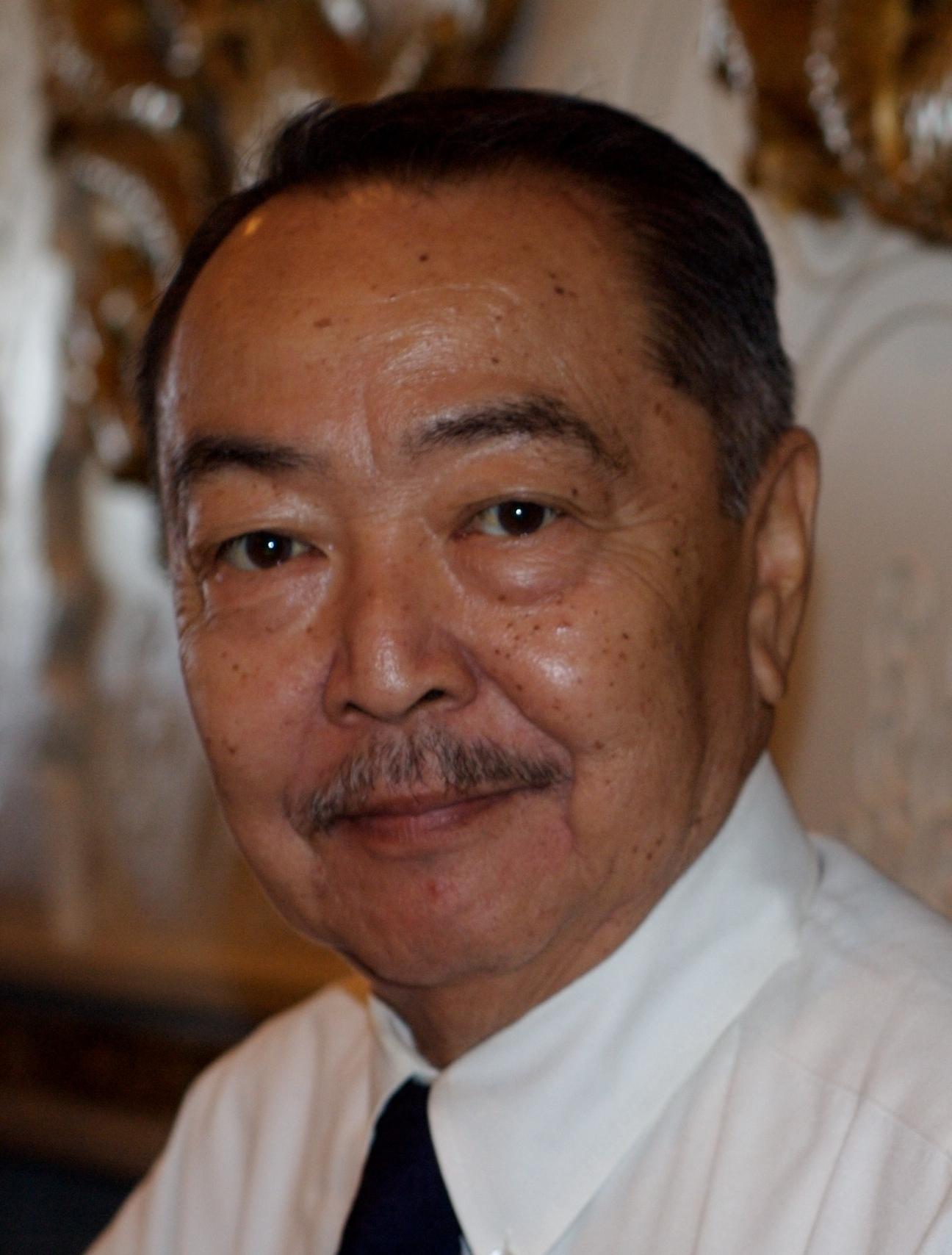
- Aoki in 2007
- Born: November 20, 1938; San Leandro, California, U.S.
- Died: March 15, 2009 (aged 70); Berkeley, California, U.S.
- Education: Merritt College; University of California, Berkeley
- Occupations: Civil rights activist most known for his role in the Black Panther Party, FBI informant against same.

Richard Masato Aoki (/ɑːˈoʊki/ ah-OH-kee or /eɪˈoʊki/ ay-OH-kee; Japanese: 青木 正人, November 20, 1938 – March 15, 2009) was an American educator and college counselor, best known as a civil rights activist and early member of the Black Panther Party. He joined the early Black Panther Party and was eventually promoted to the position of Field Marshal. Although there were several Asian Americans in the Black Panther Party, Aoki was the only one to have a formal leadership position. Following Aoki's death, the Federal Bureau of Investigation's records on him were obtained through the Freedom of Information Act, showing that, over a period of 15 years, he had been an informant for the government.

== Biography ==
Richard Aoki was born in San Leandro, California, in 1938 to Japanese parents Shozo Aoki and Toshiko Kaniye. He and his family were interned at the Topaz War Relocation Center in Utah from 1942 to 1945 due to Executive Order 9066. They moved to a predominantly black neighborhood in Oakland, California, after World War II ended. In junior high Aoki joined a gang, later would brag that he was a great street fighter, and still managed to become co-valedictorian. Later, in a deal to expunge his criminal record, Aoki spent one year in active duty serving in the United States Army, first as a medic and later in the infantry, and 7 years in the reserves. In this time he became proficient in firearms. During his time in the reserves, he was elected to The Berkeley Young Socialist Alliance's executive council and was a member of other socialist groups, reporting the information he gathered back to the FBI.

He attended Merritt College for two years, where he became close friends with his longtime acquaintances Huey Newton and Bobby Seale, the founding members of the Black Panther Party; the organization was founded in October 1966, one month after Aoki transferred to the University of California, Berkeley. He graduated with a bachelor's degree in sociology in 1968 and a Master of Social Work degree in 1970.

Bobby Seale's text Seize the Time describes Aoki as the person who provided the Black Panthers with their first firearms.

It was originally reported that Aoki died at his home in Berkeley from complications from dialysis. Nearly a year later, it was publicly revealed that he had died of suicide from a self-inflicted gunshot wound. He never married and had no children. His life was chronicled in the 2009 documentary film, Aoki.

Longtime friend and AAPA activist, Harvey Dong, served as the executor of Aoki's estate.

== Posthumous revelation as an FBI informant ==
On August 20, 2012, a report by Center for Investigative Reporting journalist Seth Rosenfeld alleged Aoki was an FBI informant who had infiltrated chapters of the Communist Party, the Socialist Workers' Party and, nearly from its inception, the Black Panther Party. In response to a FOIA request by Rosenfeld, it was revealed that a November 16, 1967, FBI intelligence report listed Aoki as an informant with the code number "T-2". Former FBI agent turned banker, Burney Threadgill Jr., also said that he worked with Aoki, stating, "He was my informant. I developed him."

On September 7, 2012, the Center for Investigative Reporting published a second story about Aoki with new documents detailing his 221-page informant file. The file was released under court order after a Freedom of Information Act lawsuit. The second story notes Aoki was designated the code name "Richard Ford". The file details 16 years of cooperation between Aoki and the FBI's San Francisco office. According to the story, the records show "that at various points, he provided information that was 'unique' and of 'extreme value.'"
