= Asian Americans for Action =

American social justice organization

- Established: 1969 (57 years ago)
- Founders: Kazu Iijima, Minn Matsuda

Asian Americans for Action (Triple A or AAA) was an American social justice organization founded in New York City in 1969 by Shizuko "Minn" Matsuda and Kazu Iijima. Influenced by the Black Power movement and opposition to the Vietnam War, Matsuda and Iijima initially envisioned a Japanese American political organization but broadened the group into a pan-Asian formation open to people of all Asian ethnic backgrounds.

Triple A became part of the wider Asian American movement of the late 1960s and 1970s. Based primarily on the East Coast, it organized against the Vietnam War, opposed the renewal of the Treaty of Mutual Cooperation and Security between the United States and Japan, and helped establish the United Asian Communities Center in New York City. In 1976, the organization changed its name to the Union of Activists, and it dissolved after approximately ten years as members moved into other political organizations.

== The Founders ==
According to Iijima, AAA began with "two old ladies" sitting on a park bench worrying about their children's future. In fact, Matsuda was approximately 58 years of age and Iijima about 51 when they set up the organization in 1969. Iijima had been interned at the Topaz internment camp during World War II, while Matsuda had moved with her family to Utah before the war due to anti-Japanese hostility in the Bay Area. By the time they founded AAA, both had been involved in pro-Asian movements for many years.

=== Kazu Iijima ===
Born Kazuko Ikeda in California, Iijima grew up in Oakland and attended college at UC Berkeley. She encountered Marxist critiques of racism through her older sister and the Young Communist League at Berkeley, and became involved in radical politics. By 1938, she had helped to form the Oakland Nisei Democratic Club to encourage more Niseis to take up radical responses to working class issues and racism. She was still living and working in the Bay Area when Japanese Americans on the west coast were subjected to incarceration under Executive Order 9066. She was sent first to Tanforan Assembly Center and then to Topaz concentration camp in Utah. She married Tak Iijima in Utah (he had been drafted into the US Army just before Pearl Harbor), and was released to move to Mississippi with him soon after.

After the war, the couple settled in New York City, and began to raise a family. Although Iijima joined the Japanese American Committee for Democracy at that time, it wasn't until the late 1960s that she returned to organizing with the founding of Asian Americans for Action.

=== Minn Matsuda ===
Born Shizu Utsunomiya in Seattle, Washington, in 1911, at some point Matsuda moved to the Bay Area where she earned an art degree at the California School of Arts and Crafts in 1933. She received some recognition for her watercolor paintings. She worked for a time for the Works Progress Administration (WPA) in the federal art project.

Matsuda and Iijima met in California before the war. Unlike Iijima, Matsuda avoided the mass incarceration of Japanese Americans during World War II because she had moved inland to Utah prior to the signing of Executive Order 9066. In Salt Lake City, Matsuda managed to find a job creating ads for a retail store despite hostility toward people of Japanese heritage. Her artwork from the WPA was included in an exhibit at the Utah State Arts Center in 1939.

Matsuda died on August 6, 2003, two years after witnessing the 9/11 attack on the World Trade Center.

== Causes and Activities ==
The war in Vietnam, which the women considered an act of American aggression, became the first cause they espoused. To enlist members, they approached persons of Asian descent at rallies protesting the Vietnam War. One of the first actions they took after forming in 1969 was to challenge the Japanese American Citizens League to take a stand against the Vietnam War. The AAA also took a stand against the renewal of the Treaty of Mutual Cooperation and Security between the United States and Japan which allowed for American military bases on Japanese soil, including Okinawa.

The core group of founders were mostly older women who had experienced the Japanese internment of World War II or its consequences. However, it would soon become a multi-ethnic, intergenerational cause. Their life experiences led them to join forces with their children's generation during the turbulent sixties. The first meeting was held in New York City on April 6, 1969; attendees included a number of college students. One of the first members of AAA was activist Yuri Kochiyama. Other notable members were Bill Kochiyama, Aiko Herzig-Yoshinaga, actress turned activist Nobuko JoAnne Miyamoto, Pat Sumi, and Iijima's son, Chris Iijima. Many of the younger members of the group were Chinese Americans.

Among their activities, the Triple A staged a rally in Washington D.C., in November 1969, in a futile attempt to stop the signing of the security treaty. Newspaper coverage of the event featured a cloth dragon with caricatures of Uncle Sam and Japan's Prime Minister Eisaku Sato as the head and tail. The group was instrumental in opening the United Asian Communities Center in New York City in 1972, but that program lasted only a short time due to lack of funding.

The group continued to evolve, changing its name in 1976 to Union of Activists to emphasize political struggle rather than racial identity. The Triple A dissolved after about ten years after losing membership to other more radical organizations, including those that espoused communism.
