= Mae Mallory =

American activist (1927–2007)

Mae Mallory (June 9, 1927 – 2007) was an activist of the Civil Rights Movement and a Black Power movement leader active in the 1950s and 1960s. She is best known as an advocate of school desegregation and of black armed self-defense.

== Early life ==
Mallory was born in Macon, Georgia, on June 9, 1927. Mae Mallory spent the majority of her early life in her birthplace, Macon. Although Mallory grew up amidst cruel racist intolerance, she accredits her female family members with teaching her that she is just as important as her white peers and how to stand up for herself. For example, when she was three years old, a white store owner tried to feed her and other Black children maggot-infested cheese. Mallory threw the cheese on the ground by flipping the tray, inciting the store owner to slap her across the face. When her adult cousin heard what happened, she encouraged Mallory to hit the store owner back, so she did. Afterwards, fifteen members of law enforcement arrived at her cousin's home looking for Mallory to which her cousin scolded the police officers for trying to arrest a toddler, teaching Mallory to always stand up for herself

Similarly, Mallory's Black female elementary school principal in Macon instilled her with pride and self-respect. Mallory said, "[T]his woman said to us that we had to stand tall…She said that the children that came from her school would face the world with their heads high, their shoulders thrown back and they would walk to the tune of 'The World Is Mine, The World Is Mine.'"

In 1939, Mallory and her family moved to Brooklyn, New York. On her first day of school, Mallory's white teacher made a snide comment about her picking cotton in the south. When Mallory corrected her teacher, telling her she'd never picked cotton and that her presumption about Black southerners is wrong, the teacher retaliated by telling Mallory to leave and refused to readmit her to the class without her mother present. She was also forced to sit in the back row of the class because she's Black. Once in high school, however, she refused to sit in the back in an act of defiance.

She finished high school in the mid-1940s and married Keefer Mallory around the same time. The couple had two children, Patricia and Keefer Jr. Shortly after the births of her children, however, she left her husband and entered the workforce. In order to provide for her children, Mallory tried out many different professions, from jewelry designing to doll making. Mallory preferred factory work since, like many other Black women, she didn't want to participate in domestic work. Mallory viewed domestic work as a form of modern-day slavery, where white women "buy" Black women to clean their homes.

== Harlem 9 ==
By 1955, Mae Mallory's two children were enrolled in the New York City public school system. At this point, in 70 percent of NYC public schools, over 85 percent of students were racially homogeneous. The city's zoning policies created a system where schools were racially segregated by mirroring the neighborhoods' lack of diversity. Although racial segregation within the school system was prohibited by law, schools were still affected by racial separation, meaning that Black and Latino children were receiving a second-class education.

In 1956, Mallory became founder and spokesperson of the "Harlem 9", a group of African-American mothers who protested the inferior and inadequate conditions in segregated New York City schools. group was originally called "the Little Rock Nine of Harlem'', however, it was eventually shortened to the "Harlem 9."

Inspired by a report by Kenneth and Mamie Clark on inexperienced teachers, overcrowded classrooms, dilapidated conditions, and gerrymandering to promote segregation in New York, the group sought to transfer their children to integrated schools that offered higher quality resources.

"Harlem 9" activism included lawsuits against the city and state, filed with the help of the National Association for the Advancement of Colored People (NAACP). By 1958 it escalated to public protests and a 162-day boycott involving 10,000 parents. The boycott campaign did not win formal support from the NAACP, but was assisted by leaders such as Ella Baker and Adam Clayton Powell, and endorsed by African-American newspapers such as the Amsterdam News. While the children were engaged in another boycott in 1960, the campaign established some of the first Freedom Schools of the civil rights movement to educate them.

New York City retaliated against the mothers, trying and failing to prosecute them for negligence. In 1960, Mallory and the Harlem 9 won their lawsuit, and the Board of Education allowed them, and over a thousand other parents, to transfer their children to integrated schools. That year, the Board of Education announced a general policy of Open Enrollment, and thousands more black children transferred to integrated schools over the next five years. (Overall integration in the city was thwarted, however, by the practice of white flight.)

== Trouble in Monroe ==
In 1958, Mae Mallory traveled to Monroe, North Carolina after the beating and attempted rape of two Black women at the hands of white men and failure for the two women to receive justice. Following the incident, Monroe native and activist, Robert Williams, called Mallory in NYC and told her that the Freedom Riders were now in Monroe. He told her that they'd formed the Monroe Nonviolent Action Committee. Mallory's friend, civil rights activist Julian Mayfield, convinced her to drive down to Monroe to comfort Mabel Williams, Rob Williams's wife, while he protests.

Mallory arrived in Monroe a week after the Freedom Riders had first started protesting outside of the Court House, trying to end racial segregation. She never picketed herself and instead helped Mabel with household chores, like cleaning, ironing, shopping, and cooking. On Sunday morning of August 27, an air of change and militancy blew through Monroe. At 4 o'clock in the afternoon, Mallory and Mabel heard gunfire coming from the courthouse and shortly after, a messenger came to the Williams's house and informed the two women that people had opened fire on the protesters and began beating them. Many protesters were arrested that day and tried for various crimes. After this moment, Mallory went back to New York City.

Once she was back in Harlem, Mallory read in the newspaper that Robert Williams was wanted in Monroe for kidnapping. The newspaper warned North Carolinians that Williams was armed and dangerous. Mallory, not knowing about Williams's whereabouts, left NYC to lie low in Cleveland, OH after learning about her own indictment.

While in Ohio, she was supported by the Monroe Defense Committee, and the Workers World Party. However, on October 11, 1961, twenty-five FBI agents found Mallory and sent her to Monroe to be tried for her kidnapping. On March 1, 1962, Mallory was put in jail without bail for one year. Finally, she was extradited back to Monroe in 1964 and tried for her crimes by an all-white jury who sentenced her to 16–20 years in prison. Eventually, in 1965, Mallory's guilty verdict was overturned after a judge said that having an all-white jury on her case was unlawful. During her time in jail, Mallory wrote Memo from a Monroe Jail, describing her experience being wrongly convicted of kidnapping and commented on the state of the nation. The title was inspired by Martin Luther King Jr.'s Letter from a Birmingham Jail.

COINTELPRO tried to break up the support group Committee to Support the Monroe Defendants.

== Activism outside of Monroe ==
She supported Robert F. Williams, the Monroe, North Carolina NAACP chapter leader, and author of Negroes with Guns, During the Freedom Rides in August 1961, she worked with Williams in protecting Student Nonviolent Coordinating Committee (SNCC) activists who were demonstrating in Monroe. This led to armed confrontations with white supremacists and allegations of kidnapping a white couple.

She mentored Yuri Kochiyama.

She was a friend of Madalyn Murray O'Hair. On February 21, 1965, Mallory was present at the assassination of Malcolm X at the Audubon Ballroom. In April 1965, she was instrumental in a Times Square protest against the 1965 United States occupation of the Dominican Republic. On August 8, 1966, she spoke at an anti-Vietnam War rally.

She was an organizer of the Sixth Pan-African Congress held in Dar es Salaam, Tanzania, in 1974. In 1974, she lived in Mwanza, Tanzania.

Her papers are held at the Walter P. Reuther Library at Wayne State University.
