= Nobuko JoAnne Miyamoto =

Japanese-American folk singer, songwriter, author, and activist (born 1939)

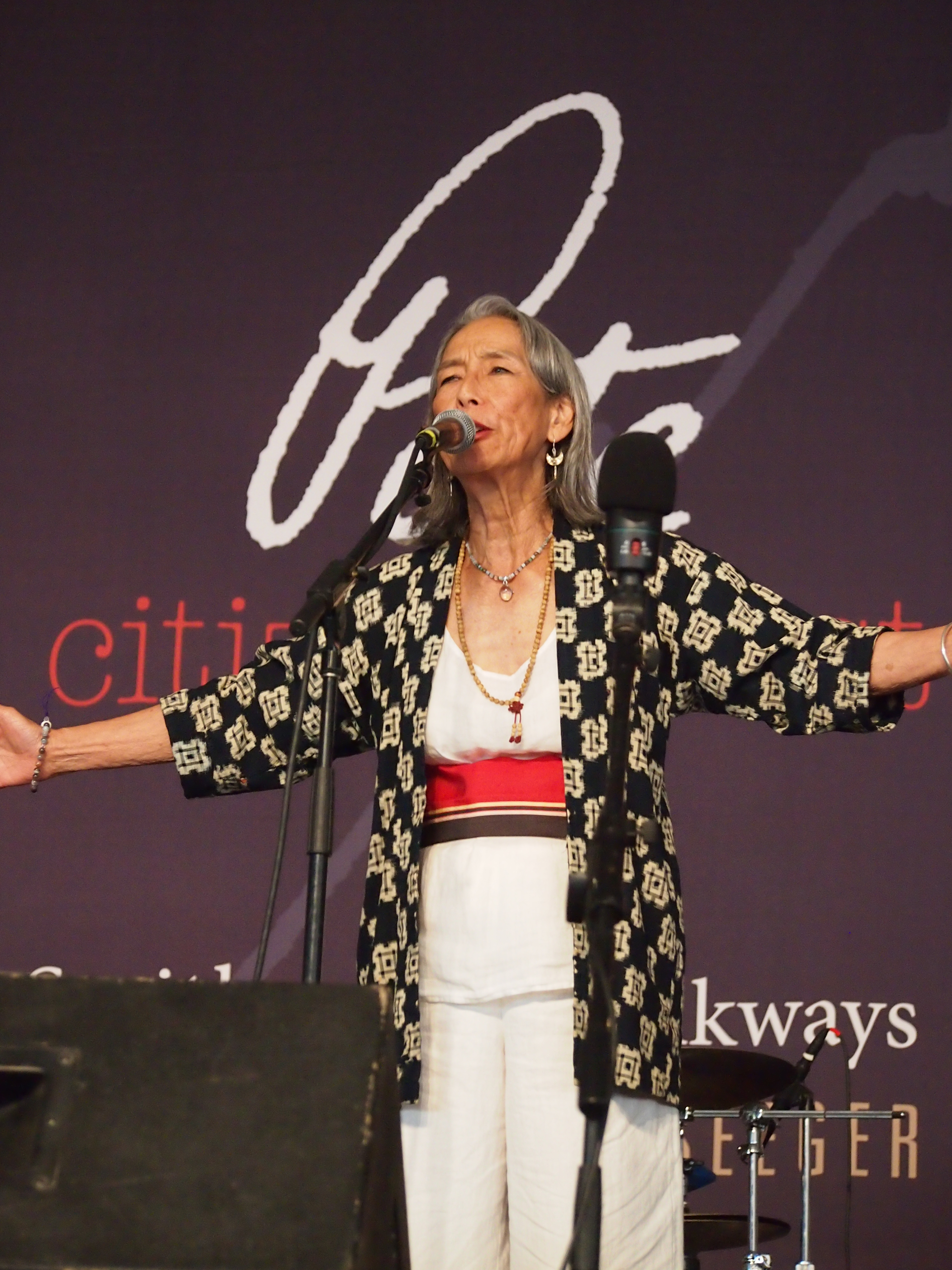

Background information
- Born: November 14, 1939 (age 86); Los Angeles, California
- Origin: Los Angeles, California
- Genres: Folk
- Formerly of: Yellow Pearl
- Website: https://www.nobukomiyamoto.org/

Nobuko JoAnne Miyamoto (born November 14, 1939) is an American folk singer, songwriter, author, and activist in the Asian American Movement. She was a member of the band Yellow Pearl along with Chris Kando Iijima and Charlie Chin. They are known for co-creating the 1973 folk album A Grain of Sand: Music for the Struggle by Asians in America. This album is considered the first Asian-American album in history. She was a member of the band Warriors of the Rainbow during the late 1970s.

In 2021, Miyamoto released an album titled 120,000 Stories, named after the approximate number of Japanese Americans, Miyamoto included, who were incarcerated by the U.S. government during World War II. She uses her music as a platform for her activism concerning issues stemming from climate change and of concern from the Asian American and the Black Lives Matter movements.

== Early life ==
Miyamoto was born in Los Angeles, California, on November 14, 1939. According to Miyamoto, her earliest memory is of Santa Anita Park racetrack, where she and her family were being temporarily held before being sent to the incarceration camps for Japanese Americans following President Franklin D. Roosevelt's signing of Executive Order 9066, which authorized this mass imprisonment. Miyamoto and her family were sent to Glasgow, Montana, after her father volunteered to work harvesting beets on a farm. They were eventually released to live with Miyamoto's grandfather in Parker, Idaho, and later Ogden, Utah, until the end of World War II.

== Dancing career ==
Miyamoto started dancing in the years following the war and began appearing in films and productions, where she was known and credited as Joanne Miya. When she was 15, she appeared in the film version of The King and I (1956).

She played Francisca, the girlfriend of one of the Sharks, in the 1961 film version of West Side Story, appearing in all of the Sharks' musical numbers.

While performing in the Broadway run of Rogers and Hammerstein's Flower Drum Song, Miyamoto became disenchanted with the representation of Asians in American popular culture, leaving the cast and moving to Seattle.

== Singing and activism ==
In 1968, Miyamoto joined Italian director Antonello Branca as he was filming a documentary about the Black Panthers in New York City, quickly becoming an ally of the Panthers' cause and befriending activist Yuri Kochiyama. She became a vocal anti-Vietnam War activist and was an early proponent of the term "Asian American". In 1972, Miyamoto and Chris Iijima were invited onto the Mike Douglas Show by guest hosts Yoko Ono and John Lennon. There, the duo performed "We Are the Children", a song which proclaimed that "We are the offspring of the concentration camp". Yellow Pearl would make no further television appearances. Yellow Pearl released the album A Grain of Sand: Music for the Struggle by Asians in America, in 1973. Alongside Asian American themes, the album covered topics including Black Liberation and indigenous land repatriation. Miyamoto, Iijima, and Chin were joined on the album by Republic of New Afrika members Atallah Muhammad Ayubbi and Mutulu Shakur.

Miyamoto had a son, Kamau, with Atallah Muhammad Ayubbi, who was killed in an ambush at a Brooklyn mosque months after the release of the album. Kamau later became an Imam and artist. She moved back to Los Angeles, becoming connected with the Senshin Buddhist Temple where began teaching dance classes. In 1978, Miyamoto founded the buddhist-inspired multicultural arts organization Great Leap. After the 1992 Los Angeles riots, Miyamoto reoriented the organization's goals toward greater Black-Latino-Asian solidarity. In 2000, she became a fellow of the Boggs Center in Detroit, becoming involved in urban farming. In the years after 9/11, Great Leap began hosting FandangObon, a festival which brings together Japanese, Mexican, and African American music and dance traditions in Los Angeles. The festival was founded by Miyamoto in collaboration with Chicano musician Quetzal Flores.
