= Yuri Kochiyama =

American civil rights activist (1921–2014)

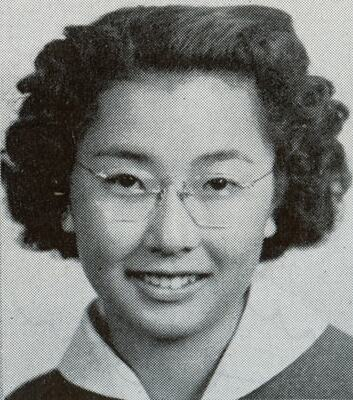
- Kochiyama c. 1939
- Born: Mary Yuriko Nakahara; May 19, 1921; San Pedro, California, U.S.
- Died: June 1, 2014 (aged 93); Berkeley, California, U.S.
- Education: Compton College
- Occupation: Civil rights activist
- Spouse: Bill Kochiyama (m. 1946; died 1993)
- Children: 6

Yuri Kochiyama (河内山 百合子 (ユリ・コウチヤマ), Kōchiyama Yuriko; born Mary Yuriko Nakahara; May 19, 1921 – June 1, 2014) was an American civil rights activist born in San Pedro, California to Japanese immigrants. She was interned at the Jerome War Relocation Center in Arkansas during World War II, an experience that influenced her views on racism in the United States. While interned, she helped run a letter-writing campaign to Nisei (transl. 'second-generation') soldiers, wrote for the Jerome camp newspaper, and volunteered with the United Service Organizations (USO). After the end of the war, Kochiyama moved to New York and eventually to Harlem, where she became involved in the civil rights movement.

At first working with the Congress of Racial Equality (CORE), Kochiyama's friendship with civil rights leader Malcolm X led her to affiliate with Black nationalist organizations such as the Organization of Afro-American Unity (OAAU), the Revolutionary Action Movement (RAM), and the Republic of New Afrika (RNA). Kochiyama advocated for political prisoners, including imprisoned members of the civil rights movement, and helped to found the National Committee to Defend Political Prisoners (NCDPP) (Note: Not to be confused with the National Committee for the Defense of Political Prisoners (also NCDPP).) in the early 1970s. She also supported the Puerto Rican independence movement. Kochiyama played an influential role in the Asian American movement and was a member of the organization Asian Americans for Action (AAA). In the 1980s, she participated in the redress movement for Japanese Americans interned during World War II, resulting in the signing of the Civil Liberties Act of 1988, which offered reparations to internment survivors.

Kochiyama is noted for her revolutionary nationalist views and her opposition to imperialism. She drew controversy in 2003 by praising Osama bin Laden, comparing him to Malcolm, Che Guevara, Patrice Lumumba, and Fidel Castro. She has also been the subject of several biographies, children's books, and documentaries and was nominated for a Nobel Peace Prize in 2005 alongside 1,000 other women.

== Early life and education ==
Yuri Kochiyama was born Mary Yuriko Nakahara on May 19, 1921, in the San Pedro neighborhood of Los Angeles. Her mother and father were both Japanese immigrants. Her father, Seiichi Nakahara, was from Iwate, while her mother, Tsuyako Sawaguchi, was from Fukushima. According to a family history compiled by Kochiyama's cousin, Tama Kondo, and his wife, Mary Tama Kondo, Kochiyama's father was the son of a retired samurai. He arrived in the United States in 1907, working first as an orange picker and then as a fish canner before opening a fish market and starting a business called The Pacific Coast Fish Company. Her mother was an English teacher and piano instructor.

Due to the relative affluence and prestige that came with the success of her father's fishmongering business, Kochiyama enjoyed a comfortable childhood. She was raised Christian, with her family attending the St. Mary's Episcopal Church in Los Angeles. She also attended several nearby Christian Science and Presbyterian churches on her own initiative, working as a Sunday school teacher. However, she criticized aspects of the religion that she viewed as being overly sectarian or chauvinistic.

Kochiyama attended San Pedro High School. While there, she became involved in numerous extracurricular activities. She attended Japanese language school; became the school's first female student body officer; wrote articles for the local San Pedro News-Pilot; played tennis; and served as a counselor for the Bluebirds, the Girl Scouts, and the YWCA Girl Reserves. After graduating, she attended Compton Junior College, where she studied art, journalism, and English. She graduated in June 1941 with an arts degree, after which she struggled to find employment due to racial discrimination.

=== Internment of Japanese Americans ===
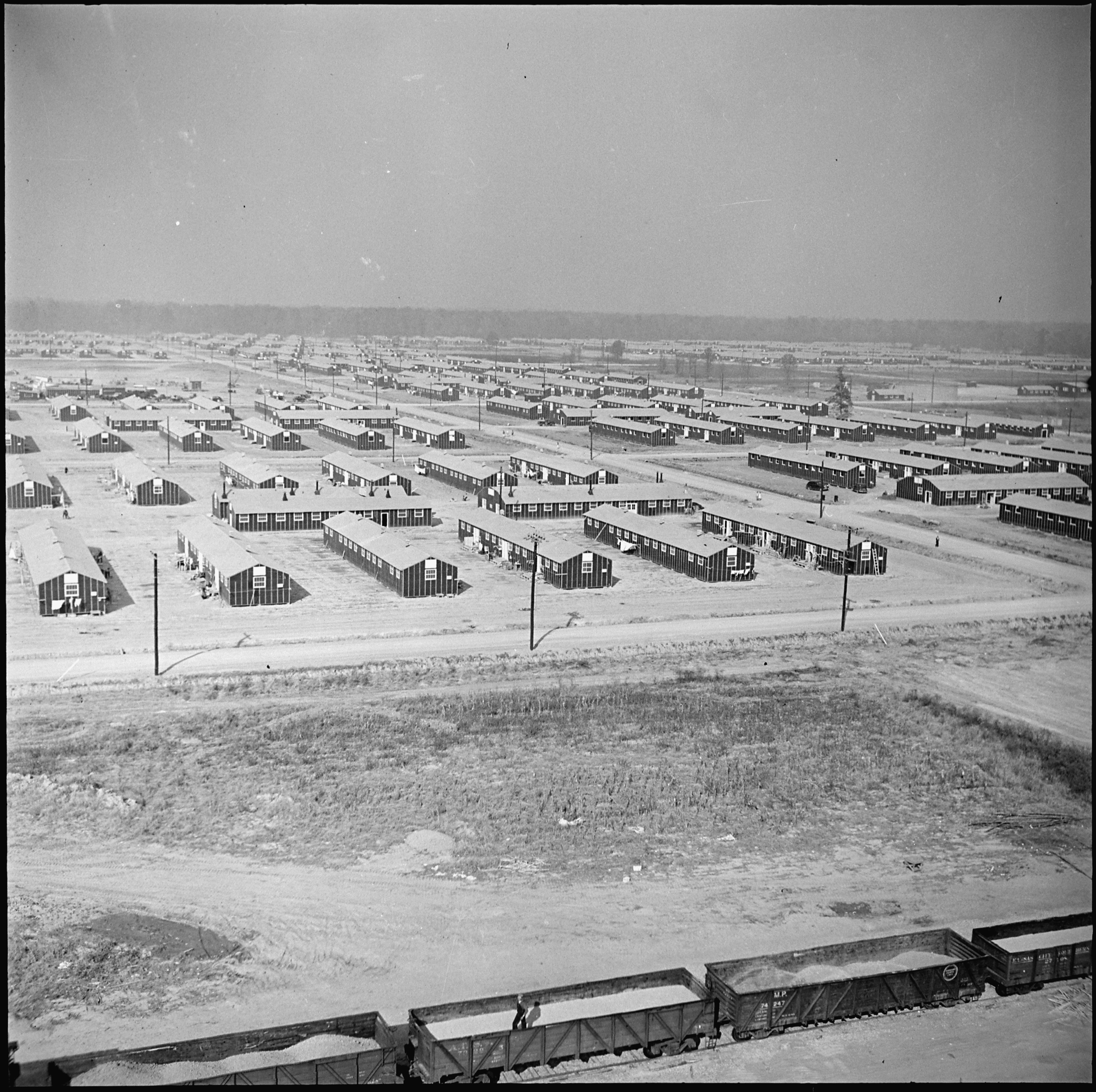
Jerome Relocation Center, 1942

The Japanese military launched an aerial assault on the naval base at Pearl Harbor on December 7, 1941, triggering the Pacific War between the United States and Japan and causing many Americans to become suspicious of Japanese Americans, viewing them as "undesirables". Soon after, the Kochiyama family's home was ransacked by members of the Federal Bureau of Investigation (FBI), who discovered photographs of Japanese naval ships. This, combined with her father's friendship with prominent Japanese figures such as Ambassador Kichisaburō Nomura, led the FBI to suspect him of espionage. He was detained at Terminal Island federal penitentiary. On February 19, 1942, President Franklin D. Roosevelt signed Executive Order 9066, which called for the forced internment of all people of Japanese ancestry living on the West Coast. Kochiyama's father, who had been experiencing health issues that were exacerbated by his imprisonment, died two days later on January 21, 1942, just after being released from the penitentiary.

In accordance with Roosevelt's order, the remaining members of Kochiyama's family were sent to the Santa Anita Assembly Center. While there, Kochiyama worked as a nurse's aide and helped to organize a group of Sunday school students called "the Crusaders". Despite being imprisoned, many Nisei (second-generation Japanese American) men joined the United States military as part of the 442nd Infantry Regiment. Because many of the Crusaders had relatives who had joined the military, they initiated a letter-writing campaign, first covering six soldiers but expanding to include roughly three thousand. The family spent seven months at Santa Anita before being sent to the Jerome War Relocation Center in Arkansas. While imprisoned at Jerome, she continued her work on the letter-writing campaign; wrote for the camp newspaper, the Denson Tribune; and volunteered with the United Service Organizations (USO).

Yuri met her future husband, a Nisei soldier named Bill Kochiyama, while working with the USO. They initially planned to get married at Camp Shelby, where Bill was stationed, in 1944, but the wedding was postponed due to objections from Bill's father, who wanted to meet Yuri before the two married. Soon after, Kochiyama left the camp to work with the USO in Hattiesburg, Mississippi and later to work with Nisei soldiers in Minneapolis. The Jerome War Relocation Center closed on June 30, 1944, and Yuri's family returned to San Pedro in 1945. Yuri moved to New York on January 23, 1946, and married Bill on February 9 of the same year.

=== Life in New York ===
The couple's first two children were born in 1947, while Bill was attending college at Long Island University and Yuri was working as a waitress. They struggled financially for some time before Bill found work as a public relations officer for the Japan International Christian University Foundation (JICUF). Soon after, they had four more children. They held social gatherings at their home on Friday and Saturday nights. The popularity of these gatherings led their home to be nicknamed "Grand Central Station", with many important figures attending the gatherings, including Japanese Supreme Court justice Mansaburo Shoda and Ishwar Gulati, advisor to first Prime Minister of India Jawaharlal Nehru. The couple also joined the Nisei Sino Service Organization (NSSO), which worked to support Asian American soldiers, and advocated for the Hiroshima Maidens, a group of 25 hibakusha (lit. 'survivor of the bomb') (Note: Generally used to refer to surviving victims of the atomic bombings of Hiroshima and Nagasaki.) who traveled to the United States in 1955 to receive reconstructive surgery.

== Activism ==
=== Civil rights movement ===
==== CORE activism ====
In 1960, the Kochiyamas moved to Harlem—at the time a predominantly Black neighborhood—during which time they befriended James Peck, an activist for the Congress of Racial Equality (CORE) who was injured as a result of his activity with the Freedom Riders. Kochiyama joined CORE and the Harlem Parents Committee, an organization advocating for improved education for inner-city children, in 1963. Also in 1963, she participated in a series of protests organized by CORE at the construction site for the SUNY Downstate Medical Center in Brooklyn. The purpose of the protests was to oppose the racially discriminatory admission policies of the unions at the construction site. (Note: The Medical Center was being constructed by laborers from the building trade unions, which were all-white at the time.) Kochiyama attended the protests with her children. At one point, she was arrested alongside her son Billy for disorderly conduct, spending half a day in jail before her release. In the end, Black and Puerto Rican workers were not guaranteed employment at the construction site as the protesters had hoped, but the protests did attract new members to CORE's cause. (Note: According to the historian Brian Purnell: "There was no guarantee that the Building Trades Council or the unions would support [Governor Nelson Rockefeller]'s and the ministers' [a group of Black ministers who supported the protests] apprenticeship program; nor did it makes promises regarding immediate jobs at the Downstate construction site for black and Puerto Rican workers". Kochiyama remembered it differently: "That was a lesson for me in how masses of people can put pressure on people in power and force them to change their policies. The construction companies were forced to hire black and Puerto Rican workers that summer”.)

==== Friendship with Malcolm X ====
The hearing for Kochiyama's arrest during the Medical Center protests took place on October 16, 1963, and it was there that she first encountered Malcolm X. She initiated a conversation with him, expressing admiration for his work but criticizing his "harsh stance on integration". Malcolm invited Kochiyama to meet with him at his office to discuss his stance on integration further but was unable to do so initially due to fears for his personal safety arising from his public conflict with Nation of Islam (NOI) leader Elijah Muhammad. The two did eventually meet again while Kochiyama was hosting an event at her house on behalf of the Hiroshima-Nagasaki World Peace Mission Study, a group of hibakusha activists calling for disarmament. They had expressed a desire to meet Malcolm while in the United States, and he gave a speech before the gathered activists. In the speech, he compared the plight of the hibakusha with the racism experienced by Black Americans and praised Asian communist leaders like Ho Chi Minh and Mao Zedong. Malcolm and Kochiyama continued to correspond after this as Malcolm traveled throughout Africa, Asia, and Europe. In 1964, Kochiyama also began attending lectures given by the Organization of Afro-American Unity (OAAU), a political advocacy organization created by Malcolm to further the civil rights movement.

External image
- "The Violent End of the Man Called Malcolm", LIFE, March 5, 1965. Photo of Kochiyama cradling the dying Malcolm X's head.

Kochiyama was present at Malcolm's assassination at the Audubon Ballroom, where Malcolm was holding an OAAU rally, on February 21, 1965. While it is not entirely clear what happened that night, (Note: The identity of the assassins is a point of contention. Authorities arrested NOI members Norman 3X Butler, Talmadge Hayer, and Thomas 15X Johnson, and the three men were convicted of the crime. However, while both Marable and Payne & Payne in their respective biographies of Malcolm identify Hayer as one of the shooters, the others are identified as Leon X Davis and William 25X (also known as William Bradley), who Marable and Payne & Payne say shot the shotgun.) Malcolm was shot multiple times by several assailants wielding shotguns and semi-automatic handguns. Initially, Kochiyama stayed to comfort Malcolm's wife, Betty Shabazz, and his children. However, eventually, Kochiyama went onstage to try to render aid to Malcolm, resting his head on her lap. A photograph taken by Life magazine depicts this moment.

==== Black nationalist activism ====
Beginning in 1964, Kochiyama began to affiliate with the Revolutionary Action Movement (RAM), a Maoist organization founded in Ohio by members of several activist groups. The organization's tenets included revolutionary nationalism and self-defense. While she never formally joined the organization, she did provide support for its work in Harlem, with civil rights activist Muhammad Ahmad (also known as Max Stanford) identifying her as a pivotal figure in the establishment of the Black Panther Party (BPP) in Harlem. Beginning in 1966, the FBI began monitoring her activities, describing her as a Black nationalist "ring leader" and potential "Red Chinese agent".

After the mass arrest of 17 RAM members in 1967, Kochiyama joined the Republic of New Afrika (RNA), a Black separatist organization that claimed five states in the Southern United States as the territory for a new Black nation. She took an oath of citizenship to the RNA on September 13, 1969, and, in accordance with the practice adopted by many Black activists of adopting Muslim names, she began to go by her Japanese name, Yuri. After attending the organization's Brooklyn Consulate, she also began to take classes on various aspects of revolutionary life with the RNA and acted as the organization's "communication person" in Harlem.

=== Support for political prisoners ===
On the weekend, we'd visit political prisoners. Everyone went according to if they had the money because it costs money to go to a prison. So each person went when they could. I mean everybody has their whole life and things they have to do at home. But I'll tell you, we were busy during that time [in the late 1960s and early 1970s]. Every week, more brothers and sisters would be arrested. We were working on scores of cases at the time—trying to keep up with the visiting, writing, attending court hearings. If I could show you all the leaflets were made, you'd get an idea how expansive the work was.

— Yuri Kochiyama, quoted by Diane C. Fujino in Heartbeat of Struggle: The Revolutionary Life of Yuri Kochiyama

Kochiyama supported political prisoners and people who she saw as victims of suppression by law enforcement throughout her life. This support began in the mid-1960s, when she began advocating for Mae Mallory, who had been arrested for allegedly kidnapping a white couple in retaliation for an attack by the Ku Klux Klan on Freedom Riders in Monroe, North Carolina. Later, after the arrest of the members of RAM, she organized a fundraising event on their behalf so that they could meet their $200,000 bond. She also corresponded with imprisoned members of the Black Panther Party (BPP); acted as a point of contact for many political prisoners affiliated with the RNA; and advocated for the Harlem Six, Martin Sostre, Mutulu Shakur, and various other imprisoned political activists. As part of this work, she helped to found the National Committee to Defend Political Prisoners (NCDPP) in the early 1970s. Kochiyama once used Eastwind Books as her address for letters from inmates and political prisoners. Eastwind Books, which was owned by Asian American Political Alliance and Third World Liberation Front activist Harvey Dong, was one of the first Asian American bookstores in the United States.

=== Asian American movement activism ===
Kochiyama is considered an important figure in the Asian American movement, which, drawing upon anti-imperialist and antiracist ethics, adopted a pan-Asian focus. Members of the Chinese, Filipino, Japanese, Korean, South Asian, and Southeast Asian communities all participated. In 1969, Kochiyama joined Asian Americans for Action (AAA), a pan-Asian advocacy organization operating in New York. As part of her work with the AAA, Kochiyama participated in various anti-war demonstrations in New York and Washington, D.C. Many Asian American activists considered Kochiyama a mentor, and she spoke at several events on behalf of the movement.

=== Conversion to Islam and family struggles ===
In 1971, Kochiyama, influenced by Malcolm's teachings and by imprisoned imam Rasul Suleiman, converted to Sunni Islam. She studied with Suleiman, attending the Sankore mosque in Greenhaven Prison in Stormville, New York. Worrying about how her family would react, she hid her conversion from her husband and children, only discussing it with her daughter Aichi. She also began to experience marital difficulties during the early 1970s as her movement activities interfered with her home life. In 1975, her son, Billy, committed suicide by drowning himself in the Hudson River after being severely injured in a car accident in 1967, which left him without a leg. After Billy's death, Kochiyama reduced her commitments to spend more time with her family. She deconverted from Islam in 1975.

=== Support for Puerto Rican independence ===
As part of her work with political prisoners, Kochiyama corresponded with Lolita Lebrón. Lebrón was a Puerto Rican nationalist who had been arrested in 1954 alongside Rafael Cancel Miranda, Andres Figueroa Cordero, and Irvin Flores after shooting at a group of United States Representatives on behalf of the nationalist movement. According to historian Diane C. Fujino:

Yuri reasoned that the independentistas would have preferred nonviolent tactics, but since the U.S. government had not responded to their peaceful requests, they viewed armed struggle as a legitimate form of struggle, as sanctioned under international law. Although highly controversial, independentistas and supporters like Yuri claim that because the U.S. government is responsible for the conditions of devastation and dependency in Puerto Rico, targeting the symbols of American imperialism—the president’s residence and Congress—is a legitimate form of resistance, even self-defense, from a revolutionary perspective.

Kochiyama served on the board of the Committee for Puerto Rican Decolonization and the Puerto Rican Solidarity Committee, though she was asked to resign from the Solidarity Committee due to her support for paramilitary organizations such as the Fuerzas Armadas de Liberación Nacional Puertorriqueña (FALN, transl. 'Armed Forces of National Liberation'). She also participated in an occupation of the Statue of Liberty on behalf of Lebrón and her fellow imprisoned activists on October 25, 1977, seizing it for nine hours before she and the other participants were arrested and released the next day. In 1979, President Jimmy Carter commuted the sentences of Lebrón, Flores, and Cancel and posthumously granted clemency to Figueroa, who had died of cancer in 1978.

=== Redress movement ===
In the 1980s, as organizers of East Coast Japanese Americans for Redress and Reparations, Yuri and Bill advocated for reparations and a government apology for the incarceration of Japanese Americans during World War II. They also spearheaded the campaign to bring the Commission on Wartime Relocation and Internment of Civilians (CWIRC) to New York. After the publication of the CWIRC report on Japanese American internment, Personal Justice Denied, and pressure from Japanese American advocacy organizations, President Ronald Reagan signed the Civil Liberties Act of 1988, which, among other things, awarded $20,000 to each internment survivor.

=== Later life and death ===
In the 1980s, after her husband's retirement, Kochiyama began working with the United Methodist Committee on Relief (UMCOR), a Christian organization that helped communities recover from disasters. She also taught international students English, volunteered at homeless shelters and soup kitchens, and continued her support for prisoners, including Mumia Abu-Jamal, a Black activist sentenced to death in 1982 for the murder of Philadelphia police officer Daniel Faulkner.

In 1987, Kochiyama helped form a support committee for prisoner David Wong, who had been sentenced to twenty-five years to life in prison by an all-white jury for the murder of a fellow inmate. Kochiyama wrote letters to, fundraised for, and visited Wong in prison. In 2004, Wong's conviction was overturned by the Appellate Division of the New York Supreme Court, which granted him a new trial where his charges were ultimately dismissed. Soon after, he was deported to China. Kochiyama also formed a similar support committee for Yū Kikumura, an alleged member of the Japanese Red Army convicted of planning to bomb a United States Navy recruitment office in the Veterans Administration building in 1988. Kochiyama believed that Kikumura's sentence was an example of political persecution and organized in his defense. Kikumura was ultimately released from prison in the United States, after which he was deported to Japan.

On November 19, 1989, the Kochiyamas' third child, Aichi, was killed after being hit by a taxi in Manhattan. Soon after, Kochiyama was fired from her position at the UMCOR. In April 1993, Kochiyama joined a delegation to Peru organized by the Revolutionary Communist Party (RCP) to gather support for Abimael Guzmán, the imprisoned leader of the Peruvian Maoist revolutionary group Shining Path. A year earlier, in 1992, Guzmán had been arrested by police acting on behalf of Japanese-Peruvian dictator Alberto Fujimori. Kochiyama was originally skeptical of working with Shining Path, which had been criticized by some members of the American left-wing movement for its use of violence. However, according to Kochiyama, after being given "reading materials" by RCP member Phil Farnham to "become ‘educated’ on the real situation in Peru", she "came to completely support the revolution" there.

Later that year, on October 25, Bill died of cardiac complications. Then, after having a stroke in 1997, Yuri moved to Oakland to live near her family. In 2000, she moved to a retirement home, and in 2004, she published the memoir Passing it On, which discusses her early life, her time at the Jerome War Relocation Center, her friendship with Malcolm, and the deaths of her children. Kochiyama died in Berkeley, California on June 1, 2014, at the age of 93.

== Views ==
=== Views on race ===
Journalist Elaine Woo, writing for the Los Angeles Times, describes Kochiyama as "straddl[ing] black revolutionary politics and Asian American empowerment movements". (Note: The original story was published in the Los Angeles Times, but then reprinted by the Washington Post.) Fujino contends that Kochiyama's views on race first developed as a result of her time at the Jerome War Relocation Center; then developed further when she moved to New York City, where she maintained relationships with Black and Puerto Rican neighbors and observed the mistreatment of Black soldiers as a waitress, noting that they "couldn't walk on any main drags in the south, even in uniform"; and then even further when Kochiyama moved to Harlem, where she began to become more politically active and where she met Malcolm. During her first meeting with Malcolm, she praised his work on behalf of the Black community but criticized his "harsh stance on integration". She wrote in a subsequent letter that:

It may be possible that non-Negroes may wake up and learn to treat all people as human beings. And when that time comes, I am sure that your pronouncement for separation will be changed to integration. If each of us, white, yellow, and what-have-you, can earn our way into your confidence by actual performance, will you ... could you ... believe in ‘togetherness’ of all people?

Kochiyama's integrationist stance was challenged by her time attending lectures at the OAAU Liberation School, whose instructors advocated for self-defense as opposed to nonviolence and emphasized international solidarity and the systemic causes of racism. In the 1966 issue of her family newsletter, the North Star, she praised the Black power movement and criticized integration's "frailty". Fujino also claims that Kochiyama was also influenced by the Black Arts Repertory Theater and School (BARTS), which was founded in 1965 by poet, educator, and activist LeRoi Jones (later Amiri Baraka) "for black people, and only black people". According to Fujino, Kochiyama may have developed an appreciation for the effect exclusionary, autonomous spaces had on white supremacy from observing BARTS's policies and practices. Fujino characterizes Kochiyama's views by the late 1960s as being in line with the principles of revolutionary nationalism. Later in life, Kochiyama tied the Black freedom struggle with the Asian American movement, praising civil rights activist Robert F. Williams for his overtures to Mao Zedong and drawing connections between the redress movement and the movement for reparations for Black Americans.

=== Views on international affairs ===
Kochiyama was a strong critic of what she saw as American imperialism. She opposed the Vietnam War, questioning the democratic motives of the United States government and claiming that the United States had actually invaded Vietnam for its natural resources. She also praised Vietnamese revolutionary Nguyễn Văn Trỗi, who had attempted to assassinate United States Secretary of Defense Robert McNamara on May 2, 1964, by planting a mine under a bridge that he was set to travel over. Kochiyama called Văn Trỗi a "hero" and claimed that "many Movement people named their children after him".

Kochiyama also opposed American military presence in Okinawa, calling American military installations there "invasion bases" whose purpose was to "attack, supply military arms and ammunitions, and to transport supplies, and to train and entertain U.S. soldiers". While she initially supported Japanese control over the islands in 1969, her views had changed by 1970. She criticized the U.S.-Japan Security Treaty, characterizing it as "the combining of American military might and Japanese economic power to rule a vast Pacific empire". She also criticized Japanese militarism, including the Japanese military's war crimes and its sexual enslavement of comfort women during World War II.

In response to the actions taken by the United States after the 2001 September 11 attacks, Kochiyama stated that "the goal of the war [on terror] is more than just getting oil and fuel. The United States is intent on taking over the world" and that "it's important we all understand that the main terrorist and the main enemy of the world's people is the U.S. government". She drew comparisons between the targeting of Arabs and Muslims after the attacks and the targeting of Japanese Americans after the attack on Pearl Harbor, claiming that both led to "racial profiling".

Interviewed in 2003, Kochiyama said that she "consider[s] Osama bin Laden as one of the people that I admire. To me, he is in the category of Malcolm X, Che Guevara, Patrice Lumumba, Fidel Castro... I thank Islam for bin Laden. America's greed, aggressiveness, and self-righteous arrogance must be stopped. War and weaponry must be abolished". The statement generated controversy, with Vox's Dylan Matthews criticizing Kochiyama's statement, characterizing bin Laden as "a mass murderer ... a vicious misogynist and hardly the brave anti-imperial class traitor Kochiyama fancies him as".

== Legacy ==
During her life, Kochiyama was the subject of many biographical works. In 1992, an oral history Kochiyama recounted to Joann Faung Jean Lee was published in Lee's book Asian Americans: Oral Histories of First to Fourth Generation Americans from China, the Philippines, Japan, India, the Pacific Islands, Vietnam, and Cambodia. In 1993, Rea Tajiri and Pat Saunders produced a documentary about her life entitled Yuri Kochiyama: Passion for Justice. She also featured in the documentaries My America...or Honk if You Love Buddha, directed by Renee Tajima-Peña; All Power to the People, directed by Lee Lew Lee; and When Mountains Take Wing, directed by C.A. Griffith and H.L.T. Quan. Several biographies were also written about her, including 1998's Yuri: The Life and Times of Yuri Kochiyama by Japanese journalist Mayumi Nakazawa and 2005's Heartbeat of Struggle: The Revolutionary Life of Yuri Kochiyama by Diane C. Fujino.

In 2005, Kochiyama was one of 1,000 women collectively nominated for the Nobel Peace Prize through the "1,000 Women for the Nobel Peace Prize 2005" project, though the prize ultimately went to the International Atomic Energy Agency (IAEA) and its director general, Mohamed ElBaradei. Then in 2007, she was the subject of the play Yuri and Malcolm X, written by Japanese American playwright, Tim Toyama. In 2010, she received an honorary doctorate from California State University, East Bay, and in 2011, a song titled "Yuri Kochiyama" was released on the Blue Scholars album Cinemetropolis.

After Kochiyama's death in 2014, the Smithsonian Asian Pacific American Center released an online exhibition entitled "Folk Hero: Remembering Yuri Kochiyama through Grassroots Art". The White House under President Barack Obama also released a statement honoring Kochiyama's legacy. The statement praised Kochiyama for her "pursuit of social justice, not only for the Asian American and Pacific Islander (AAPI) community, but all communities of color". She is featured in the book Rad American Women A–Z, which was written in 2015 by Kate Schatz and illustrated by Miriam Klein Stahl.

On May 19, 2016, Kochiyama's 95th birthday was commemorated with a Google Doodle, prompting both praise and condemnation of Google and Kochiyama, whose comments regarding bin Laden and Mao Zedong were criticized. (Note: For praise, see and; for condemnation, see and; for a mix of both, see.) The Doodle's critics included Republican Senator Pat Toomey of Pennsylvania, who called for a public apology from the company. Kochiyama is the subject of the 2024 book The Bridges Yuri Built: How Yuri Kochiyama Marched Across Movement, which was written by her great-granddaughter Kai Naima Williams and illustrated by Anastasia Magloire Williams.

== Sources ==
- Ahuja, Kiran (2014). "Honoring the Legacy of Yuri Kochiyama". whitehouse.gov.
- "Amiri Baraka". The Poetry Foundation.
- "The Bridges Yuri Built". Kirkus Reviews. 2024.
- Burt, Jo-Marie; López Ricci, José (2007). "Peru: Shining Path After Guzmán". NACLA.
- Cavna, Michael (2016). "Yuri Kochiyama: Today's fierce Google Doodle salutes former Japanese internee's lifetime of activism". Washington Post.
- "Cinémetropolis: Track Listing". AllMusic.
- Contesse, Jorge (2019). "Case of Barrios Altos and La Cantuta v. Peru". American Journal of International Law. 113 (3). Cambridge University Press (CUP): 568–574. doi:10.1017/ajil.2019.28. ISSN 0002-9300.
- Country Reports on Terrorism 2007 (PDF) (Report). United States Department of State. 2008.
- Dorsey, Saul (June 14, 2018). "Republic of New Afrika". Mississippi Encyclopedia.
- "Folk Hero: Yuri Kochiyama, as Remembered Through Grassroots Art". Smithsonian Asian Pacific American Center. 2014.
- Forster, Erkki (2024). "Great-granddaughter of Yuri Kochiyama discusses new book on activist at J-Sei's Children's Day event". Nichi Bei News.
- Fujino, Diane C. (2005). Heartbeat of Struggle: The Revolutionary Life of Yuri Kochiyama. Minneapolis: University of Minnesota Press. ISBN 978-0-8166-4593-0. OCLC 57069512.
- Fujino, Diane C. (2008a). "Race, Place, Space, and Political Development: Japanese-American Radicalism in the "Pre-Movement" 1960s". Social Justice. 35 (2): 57–79. JSTOR 29768488.
- Fujino, Diane C. (2024). "Yuri Kochiyama". Densho Encyclopedia.
- Fujiwara, Lynn; Roshanravan, Shireen (2018). Asian American Feminisms and Women of Color Politics. Seattle: University of Washington Press. ISBN 978-0-295-74436-0.
  - Roshanravan, Shireen. "Weaponizing Our (In)visibility: Asian American Feminist Ruptures of the Model-Minority Optic". In Fujiwara & Roshanravan (2018).
- Gentry, Connie (2020). "Going For Broke: The 442nd Regimental Combat Team". The National WWII Museum.
- George, Alice (2021). "Behind This Photo Is the Story of Two Asian American Folk Heroes". Smithsonian Magazine.
- Gore, Dayo F.; Theoharis, Jeanne; Woodard, Komozi, eds. (2009). Want to Start a Revolution?: Radical Women in the Black Freedom Struggle. New York, NY: NYU Press. ISBN 978-0-8147-8314-6.
  - Fujino, Diane C. "Grassroots Leadership and Afro-Asian Solidarities: Yuri Kochiyama's Humanizing Radicalism". In Gore, Theoharis & Woodard (2009).
- Hemingway, Mark (2016). "Google, Smithsonian Honor Activist Who Praised Bin Laden, Mao, Terrorists". The Weekly Standard. Archived from the original on May 21, 2016.
- "Hibakusha - Atomic Bomb Survivors". United Nations Office for Disarmament Affairs. August 6, 2010.
- Hinckley, Story (2016). "Yuri Kochiyama: a nisei ahead of her time". The Christian Science Monitor.
- Ho, Fred; Mullen, Bill V., eds. (2008). Afro Asia: Revolutionary Political and Cultural Connections between African Americans and Asian Americans. Durham and London: Duke University Press. ISBN 978-0-8223-4281-6.
  - Fujino, Diane C. (2008b), "The Black Liberation Movement and Japanese American Activism: The Radical Activism of Richard Aoki and Yuri Kochiyama", in Ho & Mullen 2008
  - Kelley, Robin D.G.; Esch, Betsy. "Black Like Mao: Red China and Black Revolution". In Ho & Mullen (2008).
- "Human Rights Activist Yuri Kochiyama Dies at 93". Rafu Shimpo. 2014.
- Jandu, Hardeep (2014). "Reflections on Yuri Kochiyama". CAAM Home.
- Jett, Dennis (2016). "Shining Path". Oxford Bibliographies.
- Kawashima, Yoshimi (2009). "A Token of Remembrance: Passing It On by Yuri Kochiyama". Discover Nikkei.
- Kochiyama, Yuri (2003). "Yuri Kochiyama: On War, Imperialism, Osama bin Laden, And Black-Asian Politics". Objector (Interview). Interviewed by Tamara Kil Ja Kim Nopper. Archived from the original on October 11, 2003.
- Kwok, Iris (2023). "One of nation's first Asian American bookstores is closing after 41 years". Berkeleyside.
- Lee, Joann Faung Jean (1992). Asian Americans: oral histories of first to fourth generation Americans from China, the Philippines, Japan, India, the Pacific Islands, Vietnam, and Cambodia. New York: New Press. ISBN 978-1-56584-023-2.
  - Kochiyama, Yuri. "Then Came the War: Yuri Kochiyama". In Lee (1992).
- Marable, Manning (2011). Malcolm X: A Life of Reinvention. London: Penguin. ISBN 978-0-14-312032-2.
- Matthews, Dylan (2016). "Yuri Kochiyama, today's Google Doodle, fought for civil rights — and praised Osama bin Laden". Vox.
- Murase, Kenji (June 28, 2007). "An "Enemy Alien's" Mysterious Fate". Nikkei Heritage. IX (1). National Japanese American Historical Society. Archived from the original on May 8, 2023.
- Nakamura, Kelli Y. (December 19, 2023). "December 7, 1941". Densho Encyclopedia.
- Niiya, Brian (2024a). "Jerome". Densho Encyclopedia.
- Niiya, Brian (September 9, 2024b). "Executive Order 9066". Densho Encyclopedia.
- "Mohamed ElBaradei". The Nobel Prize. 2024.
- Oboler, Suzanne; González, Deena J. (2005). The Oxford Encyclopedia of Latinos and Latinas in the United States. New York: Oxford University Press. ISBN 978-0-19-515600-3.
  - Caban, Pedro. "Puerto Rican Political Prisoners". In Oboler & González (2005).
- Park Dahlen, Sarah (2019), "Asian American Children's Literature", Oxford Research Encyclopedia of Literature, Oxford University Press, doi:10.1093/acrefore/9780190201098.013.790, ISBN 978-0-19-020109-8
- Payne, Les; Payne, Tamara (2020). The Dead Are Arising: The Life of Malcolm X. New York, NY: National Geographic Books. ISBN 978-1-63149-166-5. OCLC 1137810018.
- "PeaceWomen Across the Globe". PeaceWomen Across the Globe.
- Possley, Maurice (2024). "National Registry of Exonerations". University of Michigan Law School.
- Purnell, Brian (2013). Fighting Jim Crow in the County of Kings: The Congress of Racial Equality in Brooklyn. Lexington, Kentucky: University Press of Kentucky. ISBN 978-0-8131-4182-4.
- "Rad American Women A-Z". Kirkus Reviews. 2015.
- Shore, Zachary (2015). "Provoking America: Le Duan and the Origins of the Vietnam War". Journal of Cold War Studies. 17 (4). MIT Press - Journals: 86–108. doi:10.1162/jcws_a_00598. hdl:10945/47785. ISSN 1520-3972.
- Tobin, Jonathan S. (2016). "Hating America at Google". Commentary. Archived from the original on May 8, 2023.
- Trujillo, Mario (May 20, 2016). "GOP senator slams Google for tribute to controversial civil rights figure". The Hill.
- Wake, Naoko (April 21, 2021). "The 'Hiroshima Maidens' on Different Shores: Decentralising Scarred Japanese Femininity in the A-Bomb Victimhood". Gender & History. 34 (1). Wiley: 201–221. doi:10.1111/1468-0424.12527. ISSN 0953-5233.
- Wang, Hansi Lo (August 19, 2013). "Not Just A 'Black Thing': An Asian-American's Bond With Malcolm X". NPR.
- Woo, Elaine (2014). "Yuri Kochiyama, '60s civil rights activist and friend of Malcom X's, dies at 93". Washington Post.
- Yamato, Sharon (2024). "Civil Liberties Act of 1988". Densho Encyclopedia.
- Zhao, Xiaojian; Park, Edward J.W., eds. (2013). Asian Americans: An Encyclopedia of Social, Cultural, Economic, and Political History. Santa Barbara.: ABC-CLIO. ISBN 978-1-59884-240-1.
  - Fujino, Diane C. (2013a), "Asian Americans for Action (AAA)", in Zhao & Park 2013
  - Fujino, Diane C. (2013b), "Asian American Movement (AAM)", in Zhao & Park 2013
  - Fujino, Diane C. (2013c), "Kochiyama, Yuri (1921-)", in Zhao & Park 2013
- Zepel, Barry (2010). "Civil rights leader to receive honorary doctorate from CSUEB". California State University, East Bay.
