= Chris Iijima =

American musician-activist (1948–2005)

Chris Kwando Iijima (1948–2005) was an American folksinger, educator and legal scholar. Iijima, Nobuko JoAnne Miyamoto and Charlie Chin were the members of the group Yellow Pearl; their 1973 album, A Grain of Sand: Music for the Struggle by Asians in America, was an important part of the development of Asian American identity in the early 1970s.

AsianWeek columnist Phil Tajitsu Nash stated that when hearing the album or Yellow Pearl perform live, "From Boston to Chicago to San Francisco to Honolulu, Asian-derived people who had been classified in the Census as "Other" suddenly realized that they had an identity, a history, and a place at the table." Iijima sang a song from the album on the Mike Douglas Show, co-hosted with John Lennon and Yoko Ono on February 15, 1972.

Iijima was a founder of Asian Americans for Action, one of the first Asian American-focused civil rights organizations of the 1960s. Iijima later became a law professor and wrote about discrimination against Asian Americans, Native Hawaiians and members of other racial groups.

A documentary on Iijima's life, A Song for Ourselves, by Tadashi Nakamura premiered on February 28, 2009 in Los Angeles. The Chris Iijima Fund is an endowed fund supporting cultural and economic diversity at the Manhattan Country School where Iijima taught for ten years.

== Biography ==
Iijima was born in New York City in 1948 to Takeru and Kazuko Iijima. His parents, both Nisei, or second-generation Japanese Americans, were active in promoting Asian American and general civil rights issues, helping to form Asian Americans for Action (the first such organization on the East Coast) and the United Asian Communities Center.

Iijima earned a B.A. from Columbia University in 1969. As a student, he was involved in the Columbia University protests of 1968 against the Vietnam War; he is wearing a hat, immediately to the left of Mark Rudd, in a famous Life Magazine photograph of students in the office of president Grayson Kirk. He was a teacher at the Manhattan Country School from 1975-85.

In June 1988, he received a J.D. magna cum laude from New York Law School. He served on the faculties of New York University School of Law, Western New England College School of Law, and the William S. Richardson School of Law at the University of Hawaiʻi at Mānoa.

== Death ==
Iijima died of a rare blood disease at age 57, on December 31, 2005.

== Scholarship ==
Iijima authored or co-authored many legal articles, including:

- Shooting Justice Jackson‟s “Loaded Weapon” at Ysar Hamdi: Judicial Abdication at the Convergence of Korematsu and McCarthy, 54 SYRACUSE LAW REVIEW 109 (2004).
- New Rice Recipes: The Legitimization of Continued Overthrow, (Rice v. Cayetano Symposium), 3 ASIAN-PACIFIC LAW AND POLICY JOURNAL 8 (2002)
- Race Over Rice: Binary Analytical Boxes and a Twenty-First Century Endorsement of Nineteenth Center Imperialism in Rice v. Cayetano, 53 RUTGERS LAW REVIEW 91 (2000).
- Separating Support from Betrayal: Examining the Intersections of Racialized Legal Pedagogy, Academic Support, and Subordination, 33 INDIANA LAW REVIEW 737 (2000).
- "Make it Snappy!" What Rhymes with Soviet Social-Imperialism? The Line, The Music, and The Movement (with Fred Ho) in LEGACY TO LIBERATION: POLITICS & CULTURE OF REVOLUTIONARY ASIAN/PACIFIC AMERICA, Fred Ho ed. (Edinburgh, AK 2002) 243.
- Race as Resistance: Racial Identity as More than Ancestral Heritage, 15 TOURO LAW REVIEW 497 (1999).
- Reparations and the "Model Minority" Ideology of Acquiescence: The Necessity to Refuse the Return to Original Humiliation, (A Joint Symposium by the BOSTON COLLEGE THIRD WORLD LAW JOURNAL: The Long Shadow of Korematsu), 40 BOSTON COLLEGE LAW REVIEW 385 (1998) and 19 BOSTON COLLEGE THIRD WORLD LAW JOURNAL 385 (1998).
- Political Accommodation and the Ideology of the “Model Minority”: Building a Bridge to White Minority Rule in the 21st Century, 7 SOUTHERN CALIFORNIA INTERDISCIPLINARY LAW JOURNAL 1 (1998).
- When Fiction Intrudes Upon Reality: A Brief Reply to Professor Chin, (Symposium: A Duty to Represent? Critical Reflection on Stropnicky v. Nathanson), 20 WESTERN NEW ENGLAND LAW REVIEW 73 (1998).
- The Era of We-Construction: Reclaiming the Politics of Asian Pacific American Identity and Reflections on the Critique of the Black/White Paradigm, 29 COLUMBIA HUMAN RIGHTS LAW REVIEW 47 (1997).
- Swimming from the Island of the Colorblind: Deserting an Ill-Conceived Constitutional Metaphor, (Symposium: Using Law and Identity to Script Cultural Production), 17 LOYOLA OF LOS ANGELES ENTERTAINMENT LAW JOURNAL 583 (1997).
- Fictions, Fault, and Forgiveness: Jury Nullification in a New Context (with David N. Dorfman), 28 UNIVERSITY OF MICHIGAN JOURNAL OF LAW REFORM 861 (1995).
