= Michael A. Barnhart =

American historian and educator

Michael A. Barnhart is an American historian and educator whose work focuses on United States foreign relations, East Asia–United States relations, and modern Japanese history. He is Distinguished Teaching Professor Emeritus at Stony Brook University.

== Education ==
Barnhart received a Bachelor of Science degree with highest distinction in Communications Studies from Northwestern University in 1973. He earned his PhD from Harvard University. His doctoral advisor was Ernest R. May.

== Academic career ==
Barnhart began teaching at Stony Brook University in 1980, eventually attaining the rank of Distinguished Teaching Professor in 2000. He retired in 2020. His early research focused on Japan's strategic and economic planning before the Pacific War, culminating in his 1987 monograph Japan Prepares for Total War: The Search for Economic Security, 1919–1941, a study of Japan's military-industrial policy and expansionism.

His academic work later broadened to encompass broader themes in American foreign policy, including Cold War diplomacy, global military basing, and domestic political influences on international relations.

In 1982, Barnhart was a guest lecturer for a Vietnam War elective course at Ward Melville High School, where he led a class discussion on the Paris Peace Accords using PBS documentary footage and primary documents to examine U.S. diplomatic decisions, and the session, featured in The New York Times, emphasized independent analysis and historical inquiry.

He served on the SUNY–Stony Brook's W. Averell Harriman College faculty and has held guest teaching positions, including a lectureship at Kyoto University in Japan.

== Scholarly work ==
He edited the collection Congress and United States Foreign Policy: Controlling the Use of Force in the Nuclear Age. This volume, which accompanied the deposit of Senator Jacob Javits’s papers at Stony Brook University, was published alongside a scholarly conference featuring presentations by historians and commentary from senior U.S. officials, including several sitting Senators.

Barnhart's research spans diplomatic, military, and economic history, mainly focusing on U.S. foreign policy and East Asian international relations in the 20th century. His first significant work, Japan Prepares for Total War: The Search for Economic Security, 1919–1941 (1987), examines how Japan's strategic planning and resource concerns influenced its path to militarization and conflict in the Asia-Pacific region. In Japan and the World Since 1868 (1995), he broadly surveys Japan's evolving foreign relations from the Meiji period to the modern era, contextualizing its global interactions across decades of transformation.

Barnhart has also published studies on American foreign relations, including an analysis of the 1915 Lusitania incident that contrasted isolationist and interventionist arguments in U.S. political discourse. As the founding editor of The Journal of American–East Asian Relations, Barnhart helped establish an interdisciplinary platform for scholarship on cross-Pacific diplomacy.

In history education, Barnhart has been a proponent of simulation-based teaching methods. His course Great Power Rivalries 1936–1947 involved students role-playing historical figures to explore the dynamics of pre-World War II diplomacy. These teaching practices were later developed into the book Can You Beat Churchill? Teaching History Through Simulations (2021) presents case studies and pedagogical frameworks for integrating historical simulations into classroom settings.

== Publications ==
- Barnhart, Michael A. (2021-06-15), Can You Beat Churchill?, Cornell University Press, doi:10.7591/cornell/9781501755644.003.0010, ISBN 978-1-5017-5564-4
- Barnhart, Michael A. (2009). Japan prepares for total war: the search for economic security, 1919 - 1941. Cornell studies in security affairs (Cornell paperbacks, 7. printing ed.). Ithaca, NY: Cornell Univ. Press. ISBN 978-0-8014-9529-8.
- Barnhart, Michael A. (1995). Japan and the world since 1868. International relations and the great powers. London; New York: Edward Arnold. ISBN 978-0-340-52857-0.
- Barnhart, Michael A., ed. (1987). Congress and United States foreign policy: controlling the use of force in the nuclear age. Albany: State University of New York Press. ISBN 978-0-88706-465-4.
