= Akira Iriye =

American historian (1934–2026)

- 入江 昭
- Born: October 20, 1934; Tokyo, Japan
- Died: January 27, 2026 (aged 91); Philadelphia, Pennsylvania, U.S.
- Citizenship: United States
- Occupation: Historian
- Spouse: Mitsuko
- Relatives: Sister: Kyoko Iriye Selden

Academic background
- Education: Haverford College (BA); Harvard University (PhD)

Academic work
- Discipline: History
- Sub-discipline: Diplomatic history, Transnational history, Global history, History of Japan, United States–Japan relations
- Institutions: University of California, Santa Cruz; University of Rochester; University of Chicago; Harvard University
- Doctoral students: KC Johnson, Nick Kapur, Barbara Keys, Jonathan Rosenberg

Akira Iriye (入江 昭, Irie Akira; October 20, 1934 – January 27, 2026) was an American historian specializing in diplomatic history, international and transnational history. He taught at University of Chicago and Harvard University until his retirement in 2005.

In 1988, Iriye served as president of the American Historical Association, the only Japanese citizen to do so, and also served as president of the Society for Historians of American Foreign Relations. In 2005, he was awarded the Order of the Sacred Treasure, Gold and Silver Star, one of Japan's highest civilian honors. He was also awarded Japan's Yoshida Shigeru Prize for best book in public history. He also served as a member of the American Academy of Arts and Sciences beginning in 1982.

== Background ==
Iriye was born in Tokyo on October 20, 1934, and graduated from Seikei High School. His father, Keishiro Iriye, was trained in law at Waseda University and published on matters related to Japan and international relations both as a legal scholar and journalist. Akira went to the United States to study at Haverford College, where Wallace MacCaffrey interested him in the study of English history. He graduated in 1957, and accepted an invitation from the Harvard History Department's Committee on American Far Eastern Policy Studies. Iriye finished his Ph.D. in history in 1961. At Harvard, he studied with John K. Fairbank and Ernest R. May. He was awarded a Guggenheim Fellowship in 1974.

He began as an instructor and lecturer in history at Harvard; taught at the University of California, Santa Cruz, the University of Rochester, and the University of Chicago; and accepted an appointment as professor of history at Harvard University in 1989, where he became Charles Warren Professor of American History in 1991. He was director of the Edwin O. Reischauer Institute of Japanese Studies from 1991 to 1995.

After retiring in 2005, he taught at Waseda University, Ritsumeikan University, and the University of Illinois as a guest professor.

Iriye died at a retirement home near Philadelphia, Pennsylvania, on January 27, 2026, at the age of 91.

== Career and scholarship ==
The focus of his research and thinking first turned to the United States, China, and Japan's interactions in the period leading up to the Pacific War, a war which he experienced first hand as a child. His first book, After Imperialism: The Search for a New Order in the Far East, 1921–1931, based on his PhD thesis, made use of the multi-archival and multi-lingual research which characterizes his scholarship. The book presents the argument that the collapse of the "diplomacy of imperialism" after Treaty of Versailles left a vacuum in the East Asian international system, a theme also explored in his 1972 Pacific Estrangement: Japanese and American Expansion, 1897–1911. His 1981 Power and Culture: the Japanese-American War, 1941–1945 was a Pulitzer Prize finalist. The book explained the almost instantaneous transition in 1945 from racial all-out war to alliance in terms of underlying cultural parallels between the two countries.

As a graduate student, Iriye had been supported by the Committee on American-East Asian Relations, which was initiated by the American Historical Association and organized by John Fairbank and Ernest May. Iriye then joined the new generation of scholars in the field, such as James C. Thomson, Jr. and Warren Cohen, who organized conferences to explore international relations in modern East Asia. When the Committee dissolved, he and Cohen worked to establish the Journal of American-East Asian Relations to continue its mission.

Across the Pacific: An Inner History of American-East Asian Relations, first published in 1965, surveys nearly two centuries of interaction, but is more than a synthesis of scholarship in the field; it looks at how the thinking elites and policymakers in the three countries interacted, a theme explored in the conference volume Mutual Images: Essays in American-Japanese Relations (1975). This approach used but moved beyond traditional diplomatic history by incorporating cultural perspectives, shown also in his work on the Cold War, including The Cold War in Asia, (1974) and the co-edited conference volumes The Origins of the Cold War in Asia (1977) and The Great Powers in East Asia, 1953–1960 (1990).

However, the focus of his thought was moving in new directions and beyond East Asia. In his presidential address to the American Historical Association in 1988, "The Internationalization of History," Iriye pointed out that "at one level, this will necessitate the establishment of closer ties between the American and overseas historical communities. At another level, the effort will entail the search for historical themes and conceptions that are meaningful across national boundaries. At still another level, each historian will have to become more conscious of how his or her scholarship may translate in other parts of the world."

In his 1997 Cultural Internationalism and World Order and the 2002 Global Community: The Role of International Organizations in the Making of the Contemporary World he looked at the growth of NGOs and global consciousness rather than diplomacy, and called for new levels of thought and analysis.

He summed up his development for an interviewer in 2015, saying that initially he studied the history of nation-states, and in the late 1970s, began to broadly define himself as an international historian working with more than one country, then developed an interest in transnational history. He commented that "transnational history means transcending national borders, while international history still focuses on nation-states." He added that "besides nation-states and their interactions, many other things are happening in the world, and there are other ways to define groups of people. For example, in addition to citizenship, race, gender, and age can all be used to define groups of people."

== Selected works ==
In a statistical overview derived from writings by and about Akira Iriye, OCLC/WorldCat encompasses roughly 100+ works in 300+ publications in five languages and 17,000+ library holdings.

=== Selected articles ===
- —— (12 December 1988), The Internationalization of History (American Historical Association Presidential Address, 1988), archived from the original on 18 August 2013
- ----, Michael J. Barnhart, eds., "Above the Mushroom Clouds: Fiftieth Anniversary Perspectives," Journal of American-East Asian Relations 4.2 (Summer 1995): 89–179.
- —— (25 September 2020). "A Historian's Formative Years" (PDF). H Diplo.
- ———— (2007). "The Transnational Turn". Diplomatic History. 31 (3): 373–376. doi:10.1111/j.1467-7709.2007.00641.x. SHAFR Presidential address,

=== Selected books ===
- After Imperialism: The Search for a New Order in the Far East, 1921–1931 (Cambridge: Harvard University Press, 1965). Reprinted: (Chicago: Imprint Publications, 1990).
- Across the Pacific: An Inner History of American-East Asian Relations (Chicago: Harcourt, Brace, 1967). Reprinted: Chicago: Imprint, 1992.
- Pacific Estrangement: Japanese and American Expansion, 1897–1911 (Cambridge: Harvard University Press, 1972; reprinted (Chicago: Imprint Publications, 1994).).
- Power and Culture: The Japanese–American War, 1941–1945 (Harvard University Press, 1981).
- The Origins of the Second World War in Asia and the Pacific (London; New York: Longman, 1987).
- Fifty Years of Japanese-American Relations (in Japanese, 1991)
- The Globalizing of America (1993)
- Cultural Internationalism and World Order (1997).
- Global Community: The Role of International Organizations in the Making of the Contemporary World (2002)
- Holt World History: The Human Journey (2002).
- China and Japan in the Global Setting (Harvard University Press, 1992).
- Iriye, Akira (2013). Global and Transnational History: The Past, Present, and Future. Basingstoke: Palgrave Macmillan. ISBN 9781137299826.
- Iriye, Akira; Goedde, Petra (2022). International History: A Cultural Approach. New York: Bloomsbury Academic. ISBN 978-1780938066.

=== Selected edited volumes ===
- Priscilla Clapp, Akira Iriye, eds., Mutual Images: Essays in American-Japanese Relations (Cambridge: Harvard University Press, 1975).
- Yonosuke Nagai, Akira Iriye, eds., The Origins of the Cold War in Asia (New York: Columbia University Press, 1977).
- Power and Culture: The Japanese-American War, 1941–1945 (Cambridge: Harvard University Press, 1981).
- Nobutoshi Hachara, Akira Iriye, Georges Nival, and Philip Windsor (eds.). Experiencing the Twentieth Century (Tokyo: University of Tokyo Press, 1985).
- Akira Iriye, Warren I. Cohen, eds., The United States and Japan in the Postwar World (Lexington: University Press of Kentucky, 1989).
- Warren I. Cohen, Akira Iriye, eds., The Great Powers in East Asia, 1953–1960 (New York: Columbia University Press, 1990).
- The Human Rights Revolution, co-edited with Petra Goedde and William Hitchcock (New York: Oxford University Press, 2012)

== References and further reading ==
- Dower, John W. (1984). "Rethinking World War Ii in Asia". Reviews in American History. 12 (2): 155–169. doi:10.2307/2702432. JSTOR 2702432.
- Heinrichs, Waldo (1992). "Updating the Akira Iriye Synthesis". The Journal of American-East Asian Relations. 1 (4): 465–470. doi:10.1163/187656192X00104. JSTOR 23613357.
- Johnson, Robert David, ed. (2015). Asia Pacific in the Age of Globalization [Festschrift]. Basingstoke: Palgrave Macmillan. doi:10.1057/9781137455383. ISBN 9781137455376.
- Professor Akira Iriye, WW2History.com, archived from the original on 2010-07-19. Interview with Laurence Rees.
- Xing, Sally Chengji (28 January 2026), Interview with Professor Akira Iriye in his Retirement Community in Philadelphia 2015 年与入江昭教授在费城养老公寓的研究访谈. Reprint of 2015 interview.
