= Journal of American-East Asian Relations =

- Discipline: East Asia–US relations
- Language: English
- Edited by: James Matray

Publication details
- History: 1992–present
- Publisher: Brill Publishers (Netherlands)
- Frequency: Quarterly

Standard abbreviations
- ISO 4: J. Am.-East Asian Relat.

Indexing
- ISSN: 1058-3947 (print); 1876-5610 (web)
- JSTOR: https://www.jstor.org/journal/jameeasasirel
- OCLC no.: 472230254

Links
- Journal homepage

The Journal of American–East Asian Relations (JAEAR), according to its website, is a "peer-reviewed quarterly journal of interdisciplinary historical, cross-cultural, and social science scholarship from all parts of the world", which began publication in 1992. The scope includes cultural, diplomatic, economic, security relations as well as Asian-American history. Geographical coverage includes the Canada and the United States and East Asia, typically with regard to China, Japan, Korea, and Taiwan along with the academic scope also encompassing the Greater Asia-Pacific region, Australasia, Southeast Asia, and the Russian Far East.

JAEAR is indexed and abstracted in more than thirty services. and is listed as a "fast track" journal by the Bibliography of Asian Studies.

== Origins and history ==
Although JAEAR published its first issue in 1992, its roots date from the late 1960s, when many Americans were concerned about their country's engagement in Vietnam. Critical scholars of Asia, such as those in the Committee of Concerned Asian Scholars, charged that their profession had failed its intellectual duties and that Asian studies scholars had slighted their political responsibilities. In partial response, the American Historical Association set up a Committee on American-East Asian Relations. The chair was Ernest R. May, a Harvard diplomatic historian. Other members were John Fairbank, a sinologist, also at Harvard, whose goal as early as the 1930s had been to educate the American public about the "Far Eastern Crisis," and Dorothy Borg, an Independent Scholar who had worked for the Institute of Pacific Relations in the 1940s. Younger members of the Committee included Akira Iriye and James C. Thomson, Jr., both students of Fairbank and May, and Warren I. Cohen, then at Michigan State University. The committee by 1990 had become inactive but had supported a number of scholars, conferences, and publications in the field.

Anthony Cheung, who had been Iriye's graduate student at University of Chicago but dropped out to work at University of Chicago Press, then founded an independent publishing house in Chicago, Imprint Publications. Cheung convinced Iriye, Cohen, and May that the field could support a journal to carry on the work of the committee. JAEAR also received early moral and financial support from Frank Gibney, who established the Pacific Basin Institute in Claremont, California. The first issue appeared in spring 1992.

In 2012, Brill Publishers, headquartered in Leiden, Netherlands bought JAEAR from Imprint Publications. JAEAR is now published both in hard copy and online, and more than thirty services index or abstract the journal.

== Mission and significance ==
JAEAR first appeared at a time when scholars in American-East Asian relations were confident that their field was on the "cutting edge." Ernest R. May, who would become a sponsor of the journal, told the first conference of the Committee on American-East Asian Relations in 1971 that "politically and economically Americans and East Asians have become almost as interdependent as Americans and Europeans," but "do not, however have any understanding of one another comparable to the understanding – faulty though it often is – between Americans and Europeans." Warren I. Cohen, another who would become an early sponsor, in his 1985 address as president of the Society for Historians of American Foreign Relations touted the field of American-East Asian relations as a model and insisted that it was on was on the "cutting edge" of historical scholarship.

== Frank Gibney Award ==
Since 2008, the Journal has periodically conferred the Frank Gibney Award for the best graduate student essay on U.S.–East Asian relations. The award was dormant between 2014 and 2024 and was revived with new submission guidelines in 2022. The award honors Frank Gibney (1924–2006), an early and enthusiastic supporter of the Journal, who worked for more than fifty years to educate the peoples on both sides of the Pacific about each other.

- Grunow, Tristan (2003). "A Reexamination of the 'Shock of Hiroshima': The Japanese Bomb Projects and the Surrender Decision". Journal of American-East Asian Relations. 12 (3–4): 155–189. doi:10.1163/187656103793645261.
- Takeuchi-Demirci, Aiko (2010). "Birth Control and Socialism: The Frustration of Margaret Sanger and Ishimoto Shizue's Mission". Journal of American-East Asian Relations. 17 (1). (Brown University: Advisors: Naoko Shibusawa, Robert G. Lee): 1–28. doi:10.1163/187656110X536045.
- Yamaguchi, Wataru (2012). "The Ministry of Foreign Affairs and the Shift in Japanese Diplomacy at the Beginning of the Second Cold War, 1979: A New Look". Journal of American-East Asian Relations. 19 (1). (Keio University: Advisor: Koji Murata): 1–25. doi:10.1163/187656112X626300.
- Ngoei, Wen-Qing (2014). "The Domino Logic of the Darkest Moment: The Fall of Singapore, the Atlantic Echo Chamber, and 'Chinese Penetration' in U.S. Cold War Policy Toward Southeast Asia". Journal of American-East Asian Relations. 21 (1). Northwestern University, Advisors: Michael Allen, Michael Sherry: 1–30. doi:10.1163/18765610-21010001.
- Tianyu, Hua (2024). "Law, Literature, and Poetic Justice: The Chinese Exclusion Act and Late-Qing Boycott Novels". Journal of American-East Asian Relations. 31 (1). University of California, Davis: Advisors: Chen Xiaomei, Sven-Eric Rose, Elizabeth C. Miller, Howard Chiang).: 1–28. doi:10.1163/18765610-31010001.

=== Runners-up ===
- Carland-Echavarria, Patrick (2024). "Queer Exiles and Utopian Imaginaries in Occupation Japan". Journal of American-East Asian Relations. 31 (1): 29–52. doi:10.1163/18765610-31010002.
- Tran, Ann Ngoc (2024). "Supermarkets and Refugee Consumers in Little Saigon". Journal of American-East Asian Relations. 31 (1): 53–76. doi:10.1163/18765610-31010003.
- Moloney, Henry (2024). "National Security Visions for China in the George H. W. Bush Administration". Journal of American-East Asian Relations. 31 (1): 77–100. doi:10.1163/18765610-31010004.
- Zheng, Yanqiu (2015). "A Specter of Extraterritoriality: Chinese Legal Consciousness and the U.S. Court for China". Journal of American-East Asian Relations. 22 (1): 1–30. doi:10.1163/18765610-22010001.

== See also ==
- East Asia–United States relations

== References and further reading ==
- Cohen, Warren I. (1985). "The History of American-East Asian Relations: Cutting Edge of the Historical Profession". Diplomatic History. 9 (2): 101–112. doi:10.1111/j.1467-7709.1985.tb00525.x.
- Hayford, Charles W. (2012). "Editor's Note". Journal of American-East Asian Relations. 19 (2): 105–107. doi:10.1163/18765610-01902006.
- ———— (2014). "Anthony Cheung (Cheung Kin-Tak 1946-2013).(Obituary)". The Journal of American-East Asian Relations. 21 (2): 104–108. doi:10.1163/18765610-02102002.
- May, Ernest R.; Thomson, James C. Jr., eds. (1972). American-East Asian Relations: A Survey. Cambridge: Harvard University Press.
