= Asian American activism =

Activism related to Asian Americans

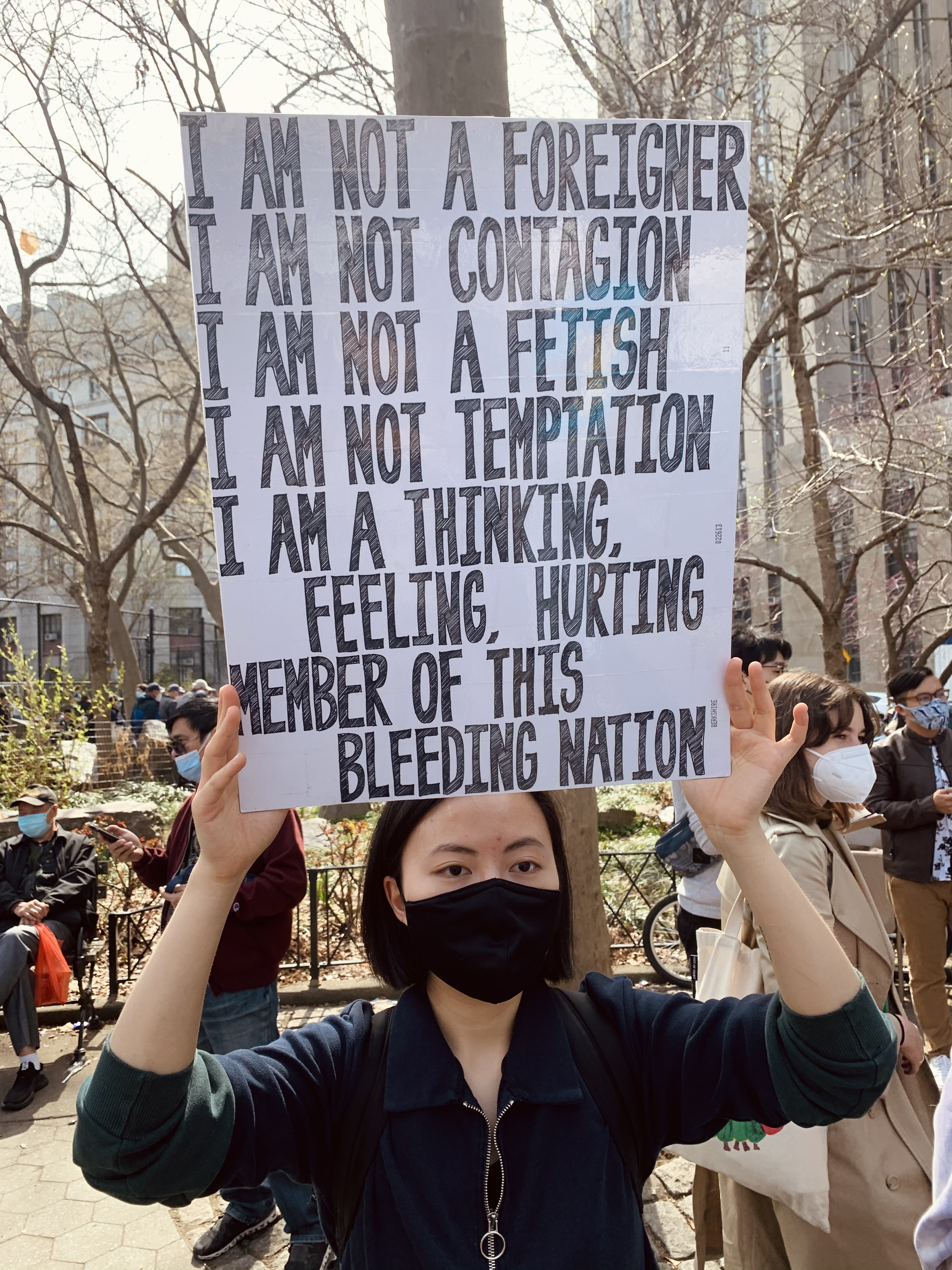
Rally for Asian American Women in Chinatown

Asian American activism broadly refers to the political movements and social justice activities involving Asian Americans. Since the first wave of Asian immigration to the United States, Asians have been actively engaged in social and political organizing. The early Asian American activism was mainly organized in response to the anti-Asian racism and Asian exclusion laws in the late-nineteenth century, but during this period, there was no sense of collective Asian American identity. Different ethnic groups organized in their own ways to address the discrimination and exclusion laws separately. It was not until the 1960s when the collective identity was developed from the civil rights movements and different Asian ethnic groups started to come together to fight against anti-Asian racism as a whole.

While racism has always been its main focus, Asian American activism has started to cover a more diverse range of issues such as women's rights, LGBTQ+ rights, labor rights, criminal justice, affirmative action, and climate change in the past decades. The increasing heterogeneity of the Asian American population has further diversified the Asian American activism scene, as various new organizations emerge and new alliances are formed both within and beyond the Asian American community. Asian Americans have sought to effect social and political changes through legal means, strikes and rallies, literature, petitions, political campaigns, and even social media.

== Background of early activism ==
Early Asian American activism was mainly in response to the racial discrimination they faced in the United States. The early immigrants faced widespread discrimination and were denied many of the same rights and benefits as white Americans. This is due in part to citizenship in the United States was defined through terms of race and gender, in particular, only white males could become citizens. From 1850 to 1952, exclusionary laws and policies, like the Chinese Exclusion Act, Alien land laws, Asiatic Barred Zone Act of 1917 and Immigration Act of 1924 prevented Asian Americans from gaining citizenship and the various rights and protections citizenship included.

In addition to discriminatory legislation, anti-Asian sentiments have existed in the United States and acts of violence have also been committed against Asian Americans ever since the first wave of immigrants arrived in the United States. Asian immigration mainly started with the discovery of gold (see California Gold Rush), California statehood, and work on the transcontinental railroad in the late 1840s, which was when discrimination and violence against the Chinese in America spread. Violent acts against Asian Americans, like the one which occurred in October 1871, when a mob murdered 19 Chinese immigrants in Los Angeles (Chinese massacre of 1871), in July 1877, when a crowd in San Francisco burned much of the city's Chinatown (San Francisco riot of 1877), when miners in Rock Springs, Wyoming, killed at least 28 Chinese in an 1885 massacre (Rock Springs massacre), and when thirty-four Chinese miners were ambushed and murdered along the Snake River in Oregon in 1887 (Hells Canyon massacre) have often been tolerated by American citizens and government.

Anti-Asian racism and violence were not limited to Chinese immigrants because later Japanese, Korean, Indian and Filipino immigrants were also treated with similar hostility and hate and subjected to attacks by the white-dominated American society. For instance, with the popularization of the "Yellow Peril" narrative, multiple Japanese restaurants and bathhouses were vandalized by a group of white supremacists in San Francisco in May 1907. In the same year in Bellingham, Washington, about 200 South Asian workers were evicted from their own houses and put into jail by a mob of white men. In 1913, when eleven Korean laborers arrived in Hemet, California by train, a mob of over a hundred furious white men threatened to use violence to force the laborers to leave the town, mistaking them for Japanese. Similarly, acts of violence against Filipino Americans also increased in the late 1920s when an attack on a Filipino dance hall in Watsonville by 400 white men was sparked by the publication of a photograph that showed a white teenage girl embracing a Filipino man.

In the face of extensive racial violence and exclusion in the United States, Asian Americans have not been passive or submissive to the status quo. Despite the socioeconomic and political restrictions which were imposed on them, they have constantly sought to find different means to challenge white supremacy and resist racism. Asian Americans lamented the harsh regulations and discrimination which had been imposed upon them by the Chinese Exclusion Act (1882–1943) and the Angel Island Immigration Station (1910–1940). Angel Island detainees turned to silent protests by writing poetry, often bitter and angry in nature, on the walls. They also constantly challenged the exclusion laws by bringing cases to court and arguing for equal rights. Moreover, in face of labor exploitation, Asian laborers went on strikes and protests to demand higher pay and better working conditions. Although the Asian American identity did not develop until the 1960s, different Asian ethnic groups formed their own social and political groups to fight against discrimination and exclusion.

== History ==
=== Asian exclusion era (1882–1952) ===
Amid the industrial capitalist expansion, a large number of Asian immigrants were admitted to the United States to fulfill the labor shortage. The majority of them were worked as manual laborers such as plantation workers and railroad workers for long hours and a small amount of pay. In response to the influx of Asian laborers, there has been a growing nativist hostility towards Asians in American society, which transformed into prevalent anti-Asian discrimination, violence and eventually exclusion laws. In face of the labor exploitation and exclusion, Chinese, Korean, Filipino, Japanese and South Asian immigrants actively resisted through legal means, strikes and protests, and letter writing to show they also deserved U.S. citizenship and protection of rights as White Americans. At the same time, despite being in the United States, many Asian immigrants maintained close ties to their home countries by actively participating in homeland politics such as independence movements and suffrage movements.

==== Chinese ====
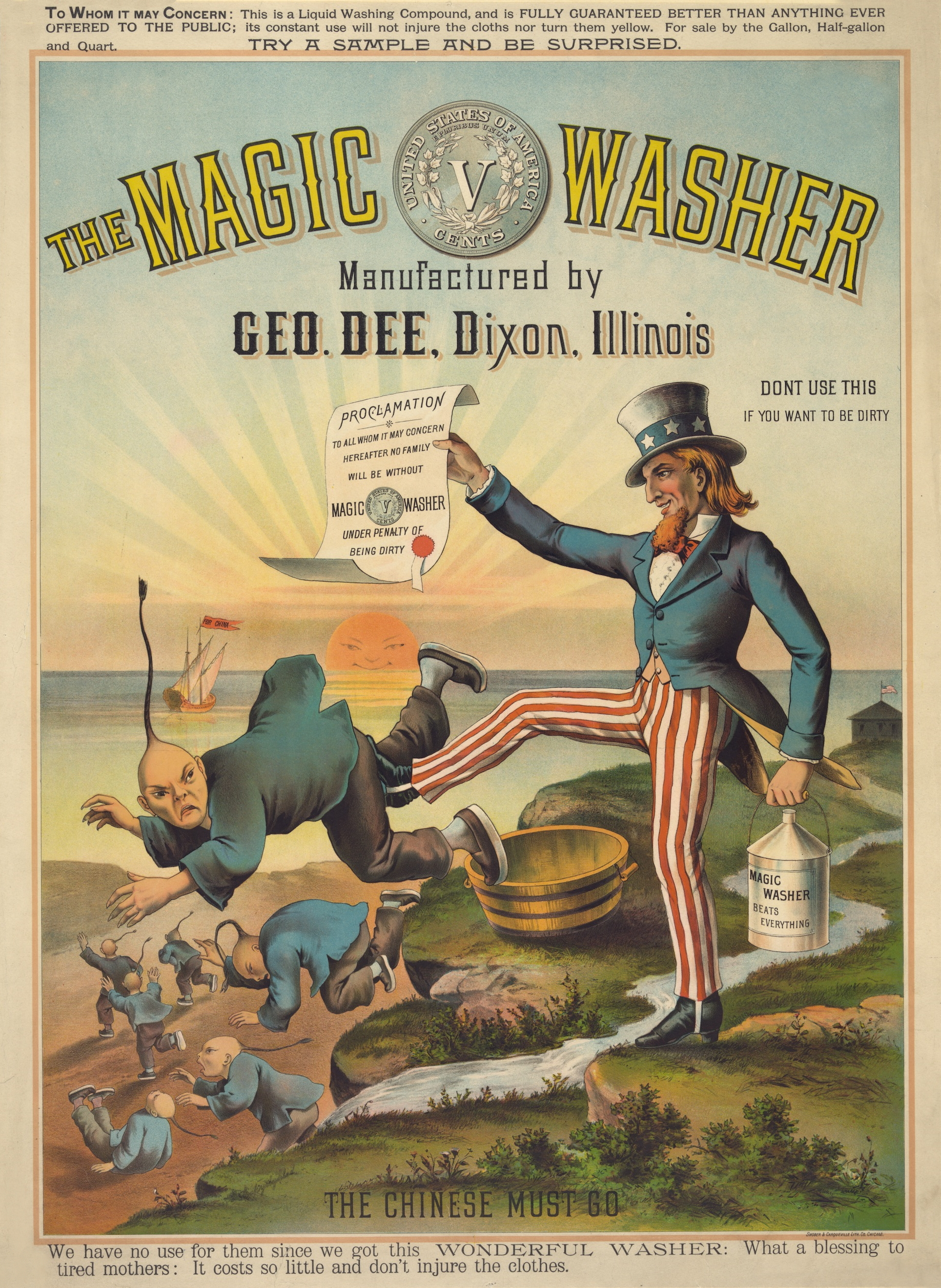
The anti-Chinese cartoon of The Chinese Must Go (1886)

In response the rising anti-Chinese sentiment and labor agitation of White workers during economic recessions, a series of exclusion laws targeted at Chinese were passed from the 1870s to 1890s, such as Page Act of 1875, Chinese Exclusion Act of 1882, and the Geary Act of 1892. The Chinese Exclusion Act of 1882 specifically barred Chinese laborers from entering the country. For those who already settled in the United States, they were also restricted from reentering if they had left the country. In addition, this Act also made Chinese permanent aliens by excluding them from U.S. citizenship.

Chinese Americans have sought various ways to challenge the exclusion laws. Several civil rights organizations were created by Chinese Americans to fight against the Chinese Exclusion Act and Geary Act. For instance, Chinese American Citizens Alliance testified before congressional committees about Chinese-American rights, and the Chinese Equal Rights League published a pamphlet condemning the exclusion policies and their denial of Chinese citizenship. In addition, the first Chinese-language newspaper in the United States,The Chinese American, was established in 1883 to raise awareness of the racism against Chinese and unite the Chinese American community.

Moreover, Chinese Americans directly challenged the exclusion policies by circumventing the restrictions and bringing the cases to the courts. They adapted their migration strategies and exploited the loopholes in the laws. Knowing that foreign-born children of Chinese-American citizens were entitled to American citizenship, many Chinese fabricated paper documents to claim to be the offsprings of Chinese Americans to enter the U.S. and obtain citizenship. Others took advantage of the checks and balances of the American political system by using litigation in the federal courts to combat the forces that opposed their entry. They hired highly experienced attorneys and chose the courts that had the most favorable rules or laws for Chinese immigration. As a result, thousands of Chinese immigrants successfully entered the US through the writs of habeas corpus issued by the courts.

The Chinese resistance was not limited to the American continent and had expanded to many other regions in Asia. The Anti-American Boycott, or the Chinese Boycott of 1905, which spanned from 1905 to 1906, was an internationally coordinated boycott of U.S. goods and services which was staged in order to protest against the Chinese Exclusion laws in China and a handful of cities in Southeast Asia. Primarily, the boycott focused on the enforcement of the laws by the Immigration Bureau, which sought to deny entry to Chinese people who were legally exempted from the law, such as diplomats, merchants and their relatives, students and tourists. On May 10, 1905, the Shanghai Chinese Chamber of Commerce called for a boycott of American goods if certain conditions were not met regarding immigration and trade policies. The conditions were not met, and that summer, a unified boycott spread to ports up and down the Chinese coast. Throughout the boycott, Chinese consumers refused to buy, merchants refused to sell, and dockworkers refused to handle exports from the U.S. President Theodore Roosevelt attempted to soothe Asian American frustration by issuing an executive order which required the Immigration Bureau to uphold U.S. laws and respect the entry rights of the exempted classes; however, no meaningful legislation was passed in support of new Chinese-American immigration laws.

==== Korean ====
Similar to Chinese immigrants, Korean also faced prevalent discrimination when they came to work as laborers in the United States. The same economic logic was used to justify the exclusion of Korean because they were accused of stealing the jobs from the Whites. Like their Chinese peers, they contested the policy through legal means. In 1921, Easurk Emsen Charr, a Korean-born US Army veteran, petitioned for American citizenship on the basis of his military service in the US army. Although his petition was denied by the court on the basis that Koreans were "of Mongol family", this case was marked as one of the first significant challenges to exclusion laws initiated by Korean Americans.

Besides resistance to exclusion, Korean Americans also actively engaged in Korean independence movement. During the Japanese colonization of Korea between 1910 and 1945, many Koreans escaped the country and sought refuge overseas, particularly in the United States. In 1909, Korean National Association was founded in San Francisco to advocate for Korean independence. After 1910, mass protests were organized by Korean nationalists in the United States to denounce the Japanese's annexation of Korea and call for unity against Japanese colonizers. At the rallies, protestors sang the Korean national anthem and waved Korean flags. When later the domestic Korean nationalist forces were crushed by the Japanese military, the Korean nationalists in the U.S., Mexico and China were able to carry on the independence movement. In March 1919, the Korean National Association organized the first Korean Liberty Congress in Philadelphia and published the Proclamation of Independence of Korea. The conference laid the foundation for the formation of the Republic of Korea in 1948.

==== Filipino ====
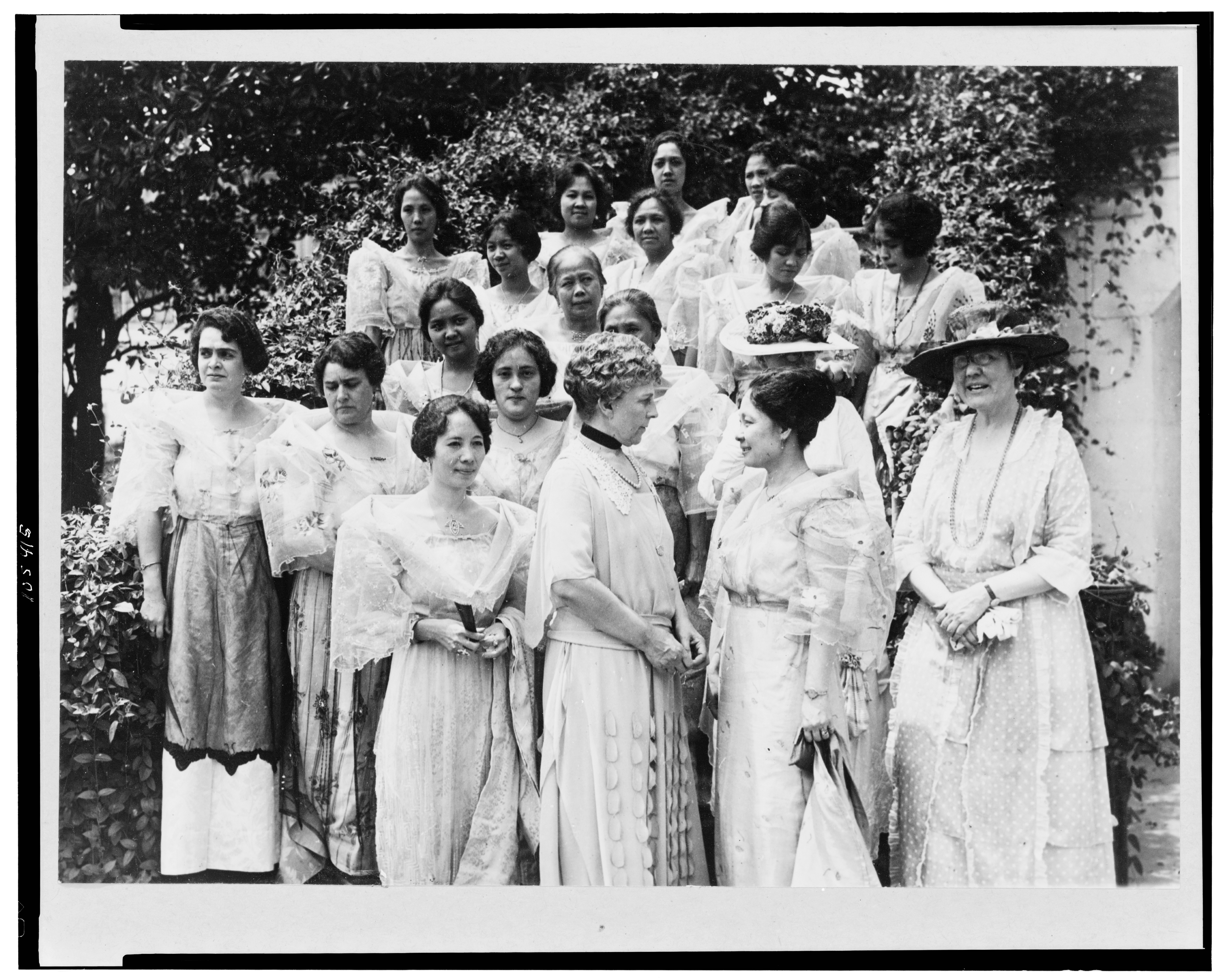
Sofia de Veyra and the wives of the Second Philippine Parliamentary Mission at the White House with First Lady Harding

As immigrants, Filipinos also encountered rampant prejudice and discrimination in the United States. However, their experience was a little bit different from other Asians since they were allowed to be in the U.S., despite not as citizens. This is largely due to the U.S. colonization of the Philippines following the end of the Spanish-American War in 1901. Many Filipinos migrated to the mainland U.S. in search for economic opportunities, but they were relegated to the most low-ranking and most exploitable jobs. Deemed as uncivilized savages, they faced unequal treatment at work.

Trapped in what Manuel Buaken described as "a pit of economic slavery", Filipino workers started to organize collectively against labor exploitation and poor working and living conditions. The first Filipino American labor organization, Anak ng Bukid, or Children of the Farm, was created in 1928 in Stockton, California, and the first Filipino strike took place in Watsonville two years later. By the 1930s, numerous Filipino labor unions emerged, including the Filipino Labor Union, which specifically called for higher wages, union recognition and improved working conditions. The labor movement did not achieve its first major success until 1939, after the establishment of the independent, all-Filipino union Filipino Agricultural Laborers Association (FALA) which aimed to unite Filipinos around the common goals of economic security and fighting against discrimination. The farm owners eventually agreed to most of the union's demands as a result of the strike of all asparagus workers during the peak of the profitable asparagus season.

Besides labor movement in the U.S., Filipino Americans were also heavily involved in the homeland politics like their Korean peers. Because of their status as colonized subjects, Philippine nationals held no political rights in the United States and could not vote or participate in U.S. politics. While Filipino men gained the right to vote in local Filipino elections in 1907, Filipina women did not gain the same rights until 1937. To advocate for Philippine independence, a group of Filipino politicians and their wives visited President Warren G. Harding in 1922. The wives of these delegates were led by Sofia de Veyra and were advocating not only for independence from the United States but also for suffrage rights in the Philippines. Through alliances with mainland American suffragists, Filipina activists organized a trans-Pacific suffragist movement and campaigned against imperialism. Although not much is known about this delegation, the women would spend decades advocating for their right to vote and other human rights causes.

==== Japanese ====
The number of Japanese immigrants sharply increased as a result of the labor shortage after the restrictions of Chinese immigration in the late nineteenth century. A vast majority of the immigrants arrived in Hawaii as plantation workers in the late nineteenth century. Exploited as cheap and hard labor, Japanese immigrants were under a rigid system of control and physical punishment. To complain about the harsh working and living conditions on the plantations, they initiated a series of work stoppages in the 1880s and 1890s. However, the stoppages were not sufficient to alleviate the mistreatment, which eventually led to the "Great Strike of 1909" when thousands of Japanese workers across Hawaii protested against the plantation owners and demanded better pay and welfare.

As more Japanese left the plantations and entered the mainland U.S. for new economic opportunities, anti-Japanese sentiments also rose. Violence and discrimination targeted at Japanese were prevalent. In response to the growing racism stimulated by the "Yellow Peril" trope, Japanese immigrants formed their own organizations and social clubs to advance their interests as a group. While some vocally opposed to the discriminatory laws claiming that they were unconstitutional, some attempted to mold the mass of Japanese as respectable subjects that were assimilable to the mainstream American community. In 1922, Takao Ozawa, a Japan-born immigrant who had lived in the United States for more than twenty years, countered the US ban on naturalized citizenship on Japanese by filing his case to the Supreme Court. Instead of arguing that the racial restrictions were unconstitutional, Ozawa contended that Japanese people should be properly classified as "free white persons". As expected, he was denied citizenship because the Court thought he was not White enough to be naturalized.

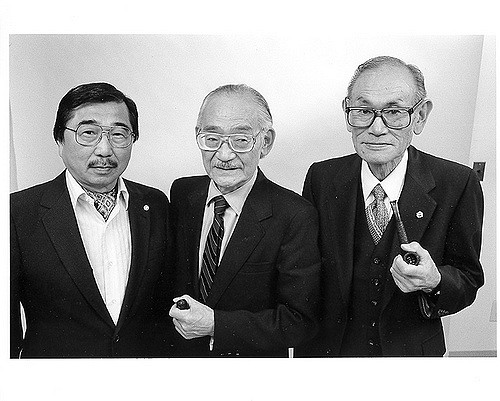
Gordon Hirabayashi, Minoru Yasui, and Fred Korematsu

The exclusion of Japanese reached its peak after Japan's attack of Pearl Harbor during the World War II. Deeming the Japanese in the US as threats to the country's national security, President Franklin D. Roosevelt issued an executive order to relocate and incarcerate over one hundred twelve thousand Japanese Americans to the internment camps across the country. A few Japanese challenged the constitutionality of the racially based curfews and incarceration. For instance, Minoru Yasui and Gordon Hirabayashi deliberately disobeyed the curfew orders to get arrested so that they could contest the constitutionality of the executive orders in the courts. Similarly, Fred Korematsu refused to leave his home for the internment camps and later brought his case to the Supreme Court, which, however, upheld the constitutionality of the internment. Inside the camps, Japanese were not passive either. Some protested against the poor working and living conditions, as seen in the strike at Tule Lake, but ended up being violently suppressed by the War Relocation Authority. The unsatisfactory conditions in these camps were recorded by various sources such as Takuichi Fuijii, whose accounts are compiled into a book known as Takuichi Fuijii's Diary. After the war, a younger generation of Japanese Americans started to demand an official apology and reparations from the US government. Inspired by the civil rights movements in the 1960s, the "redress movement", instead of centering on the documented property losses, aimed to address the broader injustice and psychological suffering caused by the incarceration.

=== The era of social change (1960s – late 20th century) ===
The 1960s is marked by a formation of a collective Asian American identity. Different ethnic groups came together to fight against anti-Asian racism. At the same time Asians were seen participating in activism that covered a more diverse range of sociopolitical issues, such as anti-war movement, labor movement, women's rights and LGBTQ+ rights movement.

==== The Asian American Movement ====
The 1960s was an era of social change. The rise of liberal, radical ideas especially among college students prompted a series of social and political movements against racism, colonialism, imperialism, gender inequality and so on. Among all the racially conscious movements, Asian American movement was a middle-class reform effort which was organized by Asian Americans and it aimed to achieve racial equality, social justice and political empowerment in a culturally pluralistic American society. The Movement spanned from the 1960s to the mid-1970s, and it signified an uptick in representation and activism within the Asian American community, a response to the discriminatory policies and sentiments which it had faced for a very long time. The Asian American movement was closely linked to other social and political activism during the same era such as the labor movements, civil rights movement, anti-Vietnam War movement, Free Speech Movement and anti-imperialist movement.

==== Delano Grape Strike ====
The Delano grape strike was one of the first nationwide demonstrations initiated by Asian Americans. The Strike significantly impacted labor rights and unionization opportunities in the United States. On September 8, 1965, over 2,000 Filipino-American farm workers went on strike and refused to pick grapes in the valley north of Bakersfield, California. This strike initiated a series of activist and labor-related events that would occur over the next 5 years. At the height of the Civil Rights Era, the Delano grape strike aimed to improve rights for laborers and minorities in the United States, especially Filipino and Mexican Americans. Not only was the strike beneficial for the representation of Asian Americans in the political and activist sphere, but achieved widespread, tangible results for labor rights and the unionization of minorities in the United States. Lifelong activist, Larry Itiliong, spearheaded the movement and garnered the support of fellow activist Cesar Chavez to strike for better pay, adequate medical care, and retirement funds. The movement was met with backlash and hostility from growers and police, but received support from figures like Martin Luther King Jr. and Robert F Kennedy. Many households nationwide stopped buying grapes in support of this civil rights movement, and union workers in California dockyards let non-union grapes rot in port rather than load them. By the summer of 1970, many of the major California grape growers were forced to pay grape pickers an increase in wages to $1.80 an hour, plus 20 cents for each box picked, contribute to the union health plan, and ensure that their workers were protected against pesticides used in the fields. The Delano grape strike represented a turning point in Asian American activism and an exercising of constitutional rights that had been denied to Asian Americans for many years.

==== Third World Liberation Front Strikes ====
In 1968, in the San Francisco Bay Area, activists from college campuses such as the University of California, Berkeley and San Francisco State University protested the absence of Asian American experiences from university curricula and the Eurocentric curriculum employed by universities. College activists focused on a variety of issues, including establishing an ethnic studies college, improving the conditions of San Francisco's Chinatown, and protesting the eviction of Filipino and Filipina residents from the International Hotel (San Francisco). The battle for the International Hotel in San Francisco involved UC Berkeley students and different groups of activists, who protested the rapid urban renewal of largely minority communities. Predominantly Filipino and Filipina citizens were affected by these urban renewal policies, but the evictions were experienced by a number of different minority groups as well. The protests of these evictions started in late 1977, and symbolized the unification of the Asian American community to protest civil rights.

Throughout the 1970s in the Midwest, college students of Asian descent organized communities of support, and many eventually migrated to coastal cities that had stronger Asian communities. Asian American college students nationwide also protested the model minority framework that many Americans had used to view Asians. Opponents of this framework considered the challenges faced by Asian Americans in a white-dominated society nonexistent.

==== The murder of Vincent Chin ====
On June 19, 1982, a Chinese American man named Vincent Chin went out with friends in Detroit to celebrate his upcoming wedding. Two white men, Ronald Ebens and Michael Nitz, thought Chin was Japanese and beat him to death with baseball bats. Vincent Chin's murder was the first federal civil rights trial for an Asian American, and the two men responsible for Vincent Chin's murder were given a $3,000 fine and zero prison time. The sentencing incited national outrage and fueled a movement for Asian American rights.

Led by activist Helen Zia, several Asian American lawyers and community leaders banded together to create American Citizens for Justice. This group gathered several diverse groups like churches, synagogues, and black activists to protest the murderers sentencing. This movement inspired other Asian Americans across the country to hold their own demonstrations. Vincent Chin's death and the demonstrations that followed provided inspiration for a group that has faced a long history of discrimination in the United States. A result of the Killing of Vincent Chin and the trial that ensued was that there was now a larger population of people who could identify with the new pan-Asian American community and protest violations of their civil rights.

==== LGBTQ+ activism ====
Asian Americans have been actively involved in queer organizing since the 1950s. The establishment of Daughters of Bilitis (DOB), the first lesbian civil and political rights group in the US was made possible by Filipina Rose Bamberger who recruited the initial members of the group in 1955. Later during the 1970s and 1980s, many Asian Americans played important leadership roles in queer activism and the AIDS movement. For instance, Crystal Jang was among the earliest Chinese Americans who publicly challenged anti-LGBTQ laws by speaking up against the Briggs Initiative, a California proposition that legalized the firing of all LGBTQ teachers. In the early 1980s, Unbound Feet, a Chinese American feminist and queer writing and performance collective, was established to address sexist and racist oppression in society, immigration, and family issues, and challenged stereotypes of Chinese women as passive and subservient. As out lesbian performers, their core members Tsui, Sam, and Woo helped bring visibility to lesbians within the Asian American community and obtained a large Asian lesbian following. In 1989, Kiyoshi Kuromiya founded Critical Path, one of the earliest and most comprehensive resources available to the public for treating HIV. In addition, since the late 1980s, Asian American queer publications have also thrived. For example, Trikone magazine was created by two silicon valley queer Indian engineers who tried to find a home for both their ethnicity and sexuality in 1986. A decade later, Al and Jane Nakatani published Honor Thy Children, a memoir of the loss of their three sons, of whom two were gay.

=== Contemporary era (late 20th century – present) ===
==== Anti-racism ====
===== Asians4BlackLives =====
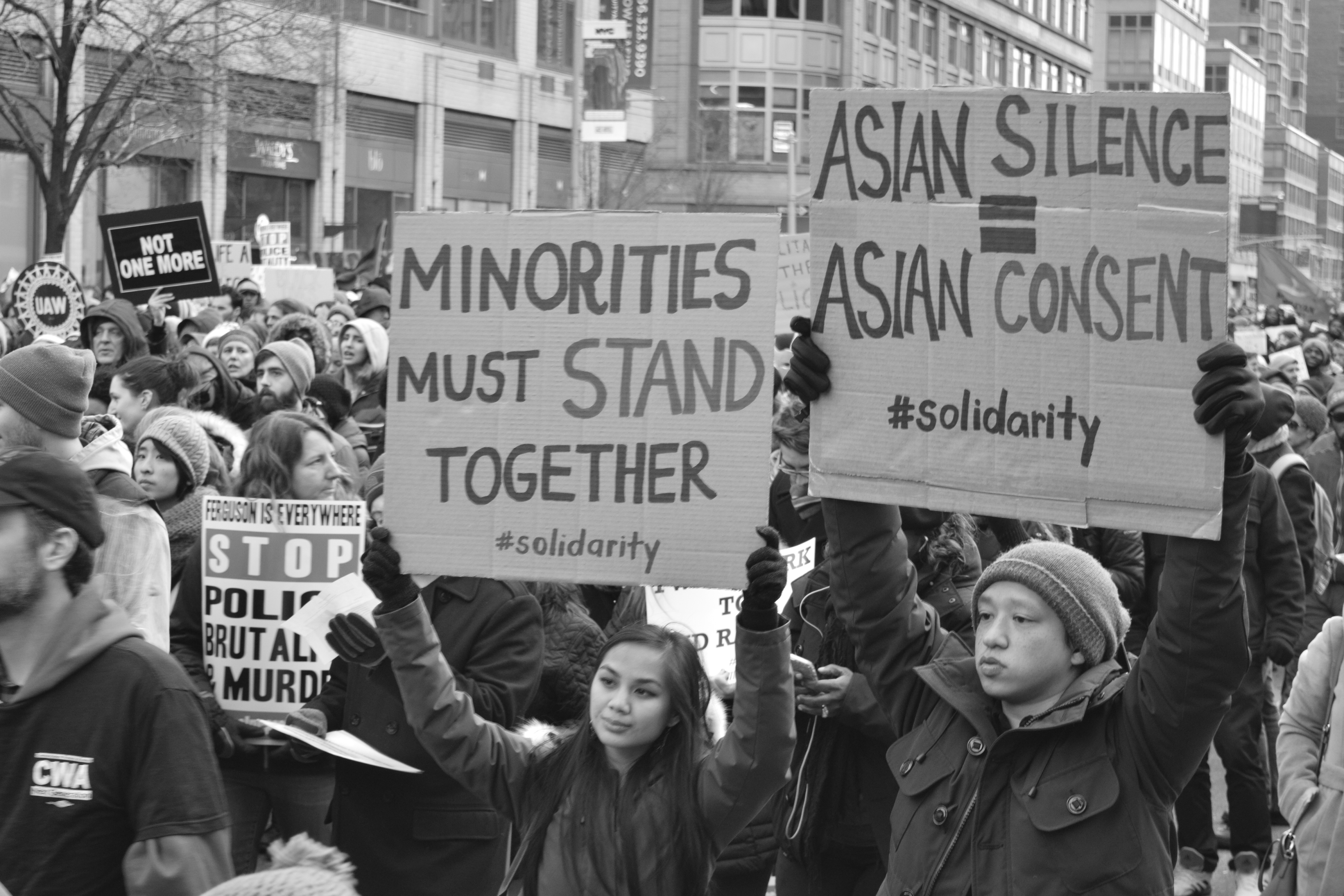
Asian Americans showing support for the Black Lives Matter movement in December 2014

Asians 4 Black Lives is a coalition of Asian Americans with diverse ethnic backgrounds such as Filipino Americans, Vietnamese Americans, Indian Americans, Chinese Americans, Pakistani Americans, Korean Americans, Burmese Americans, Japanese Americans, who serve as advocates for the Black Lives Matter Movement, which was established in 2014. Their main objective is to stand in solidarity with people of color and support Black communities which are facing racial injustice. Their mission is built on the Ferguson National Demands, which call for the elimination of discrimination and police brutality and support in employment and housing for oppressed people in the US. These demands also address the school to prison pipeline: mass incarceration of people of color, and other demands regarding racial issues which are plaguing American society.

Asians 4 Black Lives primarily focuses on solving the problems which exist within African American communities because it believes that finding justice for these communities is the foundation which liberation for other minority groups can be built upon. Its activism includes blockading Home Depot in response to the Emeryville Police Department's murder of Yuvette Henderson, and protesting in front of the Oakland Federal Building and the Oakland Police Department. It has also initiated action to build houses for impoverished people. In addition, it is involved in the work of groups such as the Blackout Collective, #BlackBrunch, and the Onyx Organizing Committee among many others.

Asians 4 Black Lives is also working with Letters for Black Lives in a combined effort to root out "anti-blackness" (the notion that African Americans are inferior) in communities. Its goal is to encourage members of older and younger generations to have discussions about issues which are related to racism and discrimination.

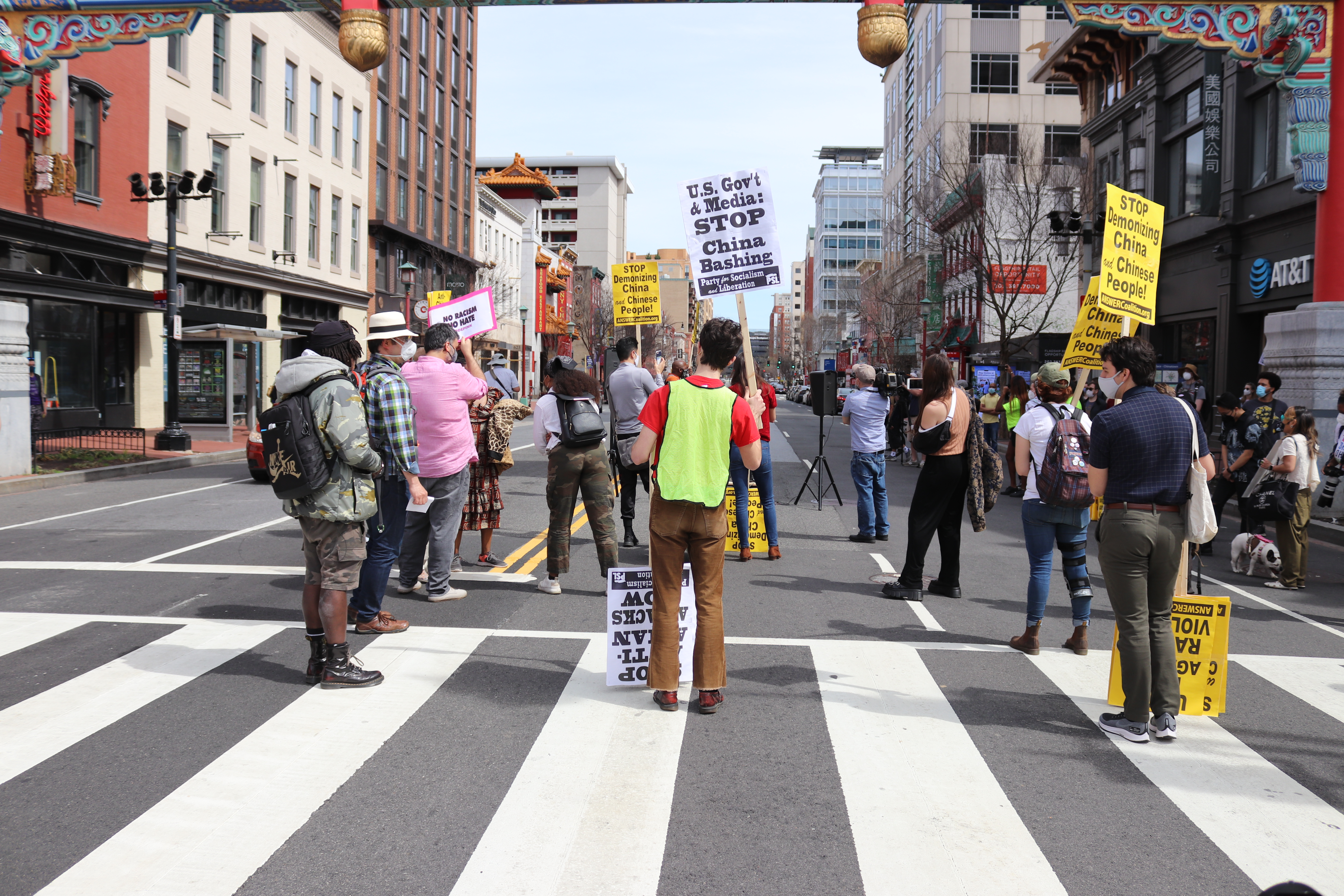
STOP ANTI-ASIAN RACISM & CHINA BASHING RALLY at Chinatown Archway in Washington, DC, in March 2021

===== Stop Asian Hate rallies =====
Movements like "Wash the Hate", "Hate is a Virus", "Take Out Hate", and the non-profit organization Stop AAPI Hate were created in order to support Asians who were attacked during the COVID-19 pandemic in 2020. The slogan "Stop Asian Hate" was frequently used in February 2021 and the usage of it became more popular due to an increase in the number of attacks which were committed against elderly Asian-Americans, like the killing of Vicha Ratanapakdee, which occurred one month earlier. Asian American celebrities like Daniel Dae Kim, Chrissy Teigen, Olivia Munn and others condemned these attacks. Later, the usage of the slogan "Stop Asian Hate" became more popular, particularly after the 2021 Atlanta spa shootings in mid-March and later, the usage of it continued to become more popular, particularly after more acts of violence were committed against Asians in the San Francisco Bay Area and New York City.

==== Make Us Visible and the K-12 Asian American History Movement ====
Led nationwide by Make Us Visible, Asian American serving organizations began advocating and successfully enacting variations of Asian American, Native Hawaiian, and Pacific Islander history in K–12 classrooms beginning in 2021. Make Us Visible's state chapters have successfully advocated for 8 laws across 6 states over the past 5 years.

In July 2021, the Teaching Equitable Asian American Community History (TEAACH) Act, which was led by Asian Americans Advancing Justice and The Asian American Foundation was signed into law, making Illinois the first state in the US to require all public schools to teach a unit of Asian American history. The legislation went into effect starting with the 2022–2023 school year. According to the bill, the curriculum would require the inclusion of the contributions of Asian Americans toward civil rights, the contributions of Asian American individuals in government, arts, humanities, and sciences, and the contributions of Asian American communities to the US. Public elementary and high schools in Illinois are also required to include content on the history of Asian Americans in Illinois and the Midwest.

In January 2022, New Jersey became the 2nd state the require the inclusion of Asian American and Pacific Islander (AAPI) history in public school curriculum after Governor Phil Murphy signed bill S4021/A6100 into law. On the same day, Governor Murphy also signed another law (S3764/A3369) that will establish a Commission for Asian American Heritage within the state's Department of Education to help develop curriculum guidelines for public and nonpublic schools in the state. These legislative acts were led by the New Jersey chapter of Make Us Visible (MUV NJ), which has advocated for the teaching of Asian American history and worked to create state resources. The bill was primarily authored by state senator Vin Gopal.

In June 2022, Connecticut passed legislation mandating the teaching of AAPI history in public schools, which takes effect in 2025. Notably, Connecticut is the first state to pass this mandate with state funding, allocating more than $140,000 to developing curricula on Asian American history. This legislation was led by the Connecticut state chapter of Make Us Visible (MUV CT).

In August 2022, Rhode Island Governor Dan McKee signed legislation mandating public elementary and secondary schools to include a unit of Asian American history in their curriculum. This legislation was led by Rhode Island's chapter of Make Us Visible (MUV RI) and introduced by Representative Barbara Ann Fenton-Fung.

In 2023, Florida became the first Republican-led state to require AAPI history instruction in primary and secondary schools after efforts by Florida's chapter of Make Us Visible (MUV FL). This legislation is also the first in the country to specifically require instruction on the internment of Japanese Americans during World War II. The bipartisan bill was introduced by Cuban American legislators Representative Susan Plasencia and Senator Ana Maria Rodriguez. The bill unanimously passed through the Floor of the House of Representatives and was co-sponsored by Black, Latino, and Jewish legislators.

In 2024, Delaware became the seventh state to require AANHPI history instruction in primary and secondary schools after efforts by Delaware's chapter of Make Us Visible (MUV DE). This legislation requires the inclusion of Asian American, Native Hawaiian, and Pacific Islander history as well as other racial, ethnic, and cultural histories in Delaware's K–12 classrooms. The bipartisan bill was introduced by Senate Majority Leader Bryan Townsend and Representative Sophie Phillips.

In 2026, Maine became the eighth state to require AANHPI history instruction in primary and secondary schools after efforts by Maine's chapter of Make Us Visible (MUV ME). Notably, Maine is the lowest-percentage Asian American state (1.2% Asian alone; 1.9% Asian alone or in combination), ranking fifth behind West Virginia, Mississippi, Montana, and Wyoming, to adopt such a mandate. In addition to requiring AANHPI history, LD 957 establishes a fully funded advisory committee to collect information and prepare classroom-ready teaching materials. The law also directs the Maine Department of Education to identify and make available instructional resources, develop best practices and exemplar modules, provide a progress report on implementation, and enable school districts to conduct curriculum audits. The bill, introduced by Representative Eleanor Sato and sponsored by Democrats, Republicans, and Independents, passed unanimously in both chambers.

Make Us Visible has chapters in 25 total states in the US, which have continued to work towards the integration of Asian American experiences into K–12 curriculum.

===== See Us Unite =====
See Us Unite is an activist movement which is designed to educate the public on Asian American history, increase cross-cultural solidarity with the AAPI community, and "amplify voices as we unite to change people's perception about what it means to be an American." This campaign highlights historical and modern inequities including violence against Asian American women, anti-Asian discrimination, and Asian American stereotypes. See Us Unite has launched a video campaign that seeks to bring attention to issues important to the AAPI community. These videos include informational segments on the Chinese Exclusion Act, Sammie Ablaza Wills, prejudices against Sikh Americans, and more.

The May 19 Project is social media campaign designed to highlight cross-cultural solidarity between the AAPI and African American communities. May 19 is the shared birthday of Malcolm X and Yuri Kochiyama.

== Characteristics of contemporary Asian American activism ==
=== Participation in social media ===
Since many Asian Americans are immigrants from Asia or have family living in Asia, it is more common for activists to use foreign social media platforms such as China's WeChat and Weibo, Korea's KakaoTalk, and Japan's LINE and Mixi, rather than American platforms such as Facebook and Twitter to engage in discussions and organize protests.

For example, during the February 2016 protests against Peter Liang's conviction of manslaughter for the shooting of Akai Gurley, Chinese Americans organized rallies primarily through WeChat. Participants in these protests often shared information to their close friends via private "friend groups" on WeChat, and this allowed Chinese Americans to easily relay up-to-date information to their relatives in China and around the world.

== Additional notable Asian American activist movements ==
Asian Americans have participated in a variety of movements and protests, including:

- 2001–2003 protests against the Patriot Act, NSEERS, and anti-Muslim policies after the September 11 attacks
- Widespread Asian American college studentprotests in coastal areas against the United States involvement in the Vietnam War.
- A 1000 people counter-protest across the Brooklyn Bridge to protest the outcome of the 2014 Shooting of Akai Gurley, in which the Chinese-American community considered Officer Peter Liang to have been scapegoated for the black man's shooting in an alleged attempt at appeasement. The counter-protest was a result of white officers in similar cases having been exonerated while Liang was with the full penalties of the law, suggesting that his indictment may have been unfair.
- The Students for Fair Admissions v. President and Fellows of Harvard College lawsuit
- The 2016 social media campaigns to increase representation of Asian Americans in Hollywood, including the use of Twitter hashtags #StarringJohnCho and #StarringConstanceWu
- Andrew Yang 2020 presidential campaign
- Opposition to Donald Trump in the 2016 United States presidential election

== List of associated concerned groups ==
- Third World Liberation Front
- Japanese American Citizens League
- Intercollegiate Chinese for Social Action
- Committee of 100
- Stand with Asian Americans
- Korean American Coalition
- The Asian American Foundation
- Make Us Visible
- Apex for Youth
- Asian American Political Alliance at UC Berkeley
- Gidra Newspaper at UCLA
- Philippine-American College Endeavor at SFSU
- Asian American Studies Conference
- Very Asian Foundation
- Asian American Education Project
- Hate is a Virus
- Stop AAPI Hate, a coalition of three organizations
- Asian Americans Advancing Justice
- United Peace Collaborative
- Asian American Action Fund
- Seniors Fight Back

== List of notable activists ==
=== Larry Itliong ===
Larry Itiliong (October 25, 1913 – February 8, 1977) was a key figure in Civil rights era activism for the Asian American community, especially for people of Philippine descent. Filipino activism, largely fueled by the Delano grape strike, in the United States corresponded to worldwide "Third-World" national liberation movements, and Itiliong formed the United Farm Workers of America alongside Philip Vera Cruz. Born in the Philippines, in 1913, Itilong moved to the United States in 1929 and joined his first strike in 1930. The 1930 strike led to the founding of the Alaska Canneries Worker Union, which aims to mandate 8-hour work days that supports overtime. Itiliong had a sustained history of leadership in the unionization of workers, he started for the International Longshore and Warehouse Union, he served as secretary of the Filipino Community of Stockton, then founded the Filipino Farm Labor Union, and was eventually leading the AFL–CIO union Agricultural Workers Organizing Committee.

=== Yuri Kochiyama ===
Yuri Kochiyama (May 19, 1921 – June 1, 2014) was a Japanese-American political activist who advocated for social justice and human rights movements, specifically during the Civil Rights Era. In 1943, Kochiyama and her family were sent to a concentration camp in Arkansas, for two years as a result of discriminatory World War Two policy in the United States. The internment of Japanese Americans resulted in the relocation and restriction of 120,000 people of Japanese ancestry, most of whom lived on the Pacific Coast, and fueled Kochyiama to fight for human rights, specifically for Asian Americans. The painful experiences of her internment, coupled with her father's death made Kochiyama aware of governmental abuses the violations of human rights that have been experienced by minority groups in the United States. Kochiyama's activism started in Harlem in the early 1960s, where she participated in the Asian American, Black, and Third World movements for civil and human rights, ethnic studies, and against the war in Vietnam. She also supported movements involving organizations such as the Young Lords and the Harlem Community for Self Defense. Kochiyama helped found the organization Asian Americans for Action, and linked her activism to the more political Asian American movement. Kochiyama would continue to fight for movements including the struggle for Black liberation, Puerto Rican Independence, and communist revolutionary movements in Peru.

- Eqbal Ahmad
- Guy Aoki
- Grace Lee Boggs
- Helen Zia
- Cecilia Chung
- Vijay Gupta
- Yuji Ichioka
- Fred Korematsu
- Corky Lee
- Helie Lee
- Marie Myung-Ok Lee
- Ai-jen Poo
- Sonalee Rashatwar
- Shakira Sison
- Thenmozhi Soundararajan
- George Takei
- Simon Tam
- Haunani-Kay Trask
- Velma Veloria
- Evelyn Yoshimura
- Judy Yung
- Cathy Park Hong
- Gil Mangaoang
- Kiyoshi Kuromiya

== See also ==
- Asian Americans
- History of Asian Americans
- Asian American studies
- Racism in the United States
- History of Chinese Americans
- History of Japanese Americans
- Anti-Chinese sentiment in the United States
- Anti-Japanese sentiment in the United States
- Asia–United States relations
- China–United States relations
- East Asia–United States relations
- Japan–United States relations
- Identity Politics
- Activism
- Advocacy
- Index of articles related to Asian Americans
- Intersectionality
