= Jonathan Rosenberg (historian) =

American historian and author (born 1958)

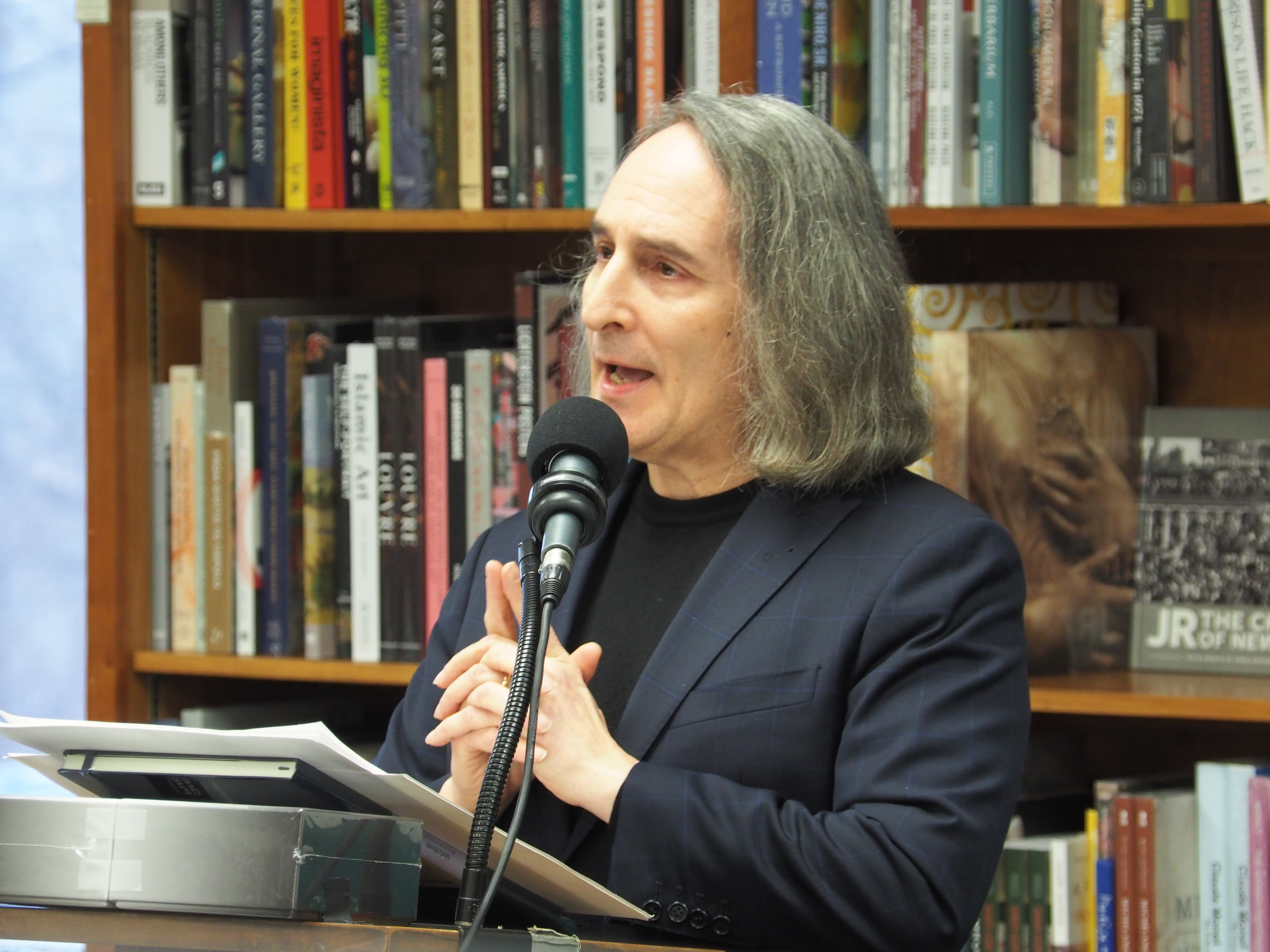
- Jonathan Rosenberg in 2020
- Born: March 14, 1958 (age 68)

Academic background
- Education: Juilliard; Harvard University (PhD)
- Thesis: How Far the Promised Land? World Affairs and the American Civil Rights Movement from the First World War to Vietnam (1997)

Academic work
- Discipline: Historian
- Institutions: Hunter College

Jonathan Seth Rosenberg (born March 14, 1958) is an American historian and author. He is a professor at Hunter College.

== Education and career ==
Rosenberg attended music school at Juilliard, and worked for a time as a classical musician. He later went back to get his PhD in history from Harvard University in 1997. His thesis, which he later published in expanded form as a book, was titled How Far the Promised Land? World Affairs and the American Civil Rights Movement from the First World War to Vietnam, and was directed by Akira Iriye and Ernest R. May. He has been at Hunter College since 2001.

== Books ==
- Rosenberg, Jonathan; Karabell, Zachary (2003). Kennedy, Johnson, and the Quest for Justice: The Civil Rights Tapes. W.W. Norton. ISBN 978-0-393-05122-3.
- Rosenberg, Jonathan (2006). How Far the Promised Land? World Affairs and the American Civil Rights Movement from the First World War to Vietnam. Princeton University Press. ISBN 978-0-691-18729-7.
- Rosenberg, Jonathan (2019). Dangerous Melodies: Classical Music in America from the Great War through the Cold War. W. W. Norton. ISBN 978-0-393-60843-4.
