= Asia–United States relations =

Asia–United States relations are covered in these articles:

- Foreign relations of the United States
- East Asia–United States relations
- Afghanistan–United States relations
- Armenia–United States relations
- Azerbaijan–United States relations
- Bahrain–United States relations
- Bangladesh–United States relations
- Bhutan–United States relations
- Brunei–United States relations
- Cambodia–United States relations
- China–United States relations
- Cyprus–United States relations
- (Georgia (country)) Georgia–United States relations
- Hong Kong–United States relations
- India–United States relations
- Indonesia–United States relations
- Iran–United States relations
- Iraq–United States relations
- Israel–United States relations
- Japan–United States relations
- Jordan–United States relations
- Kazakhstan–United States relations
- Kuwait–United States relations
- Kyrgyzstan–United States relations
- Laos–United States relations
- Lebanon–United States relations
- Macau–United States relations
- Malaysia–United States relations
- Maldives–United States relations
- Mongolia–United States relations
- Myanmar–United States relations
- Nepal–United States relations
- North Korea–United States relations
- Oman–United States relations
- Pakistan–United States relations
- Palestine–United States relations
- Philippines–United States relations
- Qatar–United States relations
- Russia–United States relations
- Saudi Arabia–United States relations
- Singapore–United States relations
- South Korea–United States relations
- Sri Lanka–United States relations
- Syria–United States relations
- Taiwan–United States relations
- Tajikistan–United States relations
- Thailand–United States relations
- Timor-Leste–United States relations
- Turkey–United States relations
- Turkmenistan–United States relations
- United Arab Emirates–United States relations
- United States–Uzbekistan relations
- United States–Vietnam relations
- United States–Yemen relations
