= Albert Gee =

- 主朝波
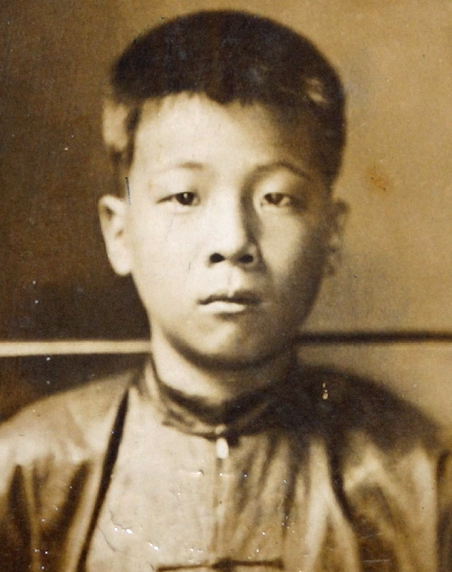
- Albert Gee c. 1920s
- Born: 1920; Detroit, Michigan, United States
- Died: 1978 (aged 57–58); Houston, Texas, United States
- Occupations: Businessman, Restaurateur, Activist
- Organization(s): Grand Lodge Chinese American Citizens Alliance (CACA), The Houston Lodge of the Chinese American Citizens Alliance (CACA), The Houston Restaurant Association, Rotary Club of Houston
- Spouse: Jane Eng Gee
- Children: Linda Wu, Janita Gee
- Parent(s): Woo Gee, Wong Ting Moy
- Family: Gee Family

Albert Gee (born C. B. Albert Gee [Simplified Chinese: 主朝波, Pinyin: Zhǔ Cháo Bō] in 1920, died 1978) was an American businessman, restauranteur, and Asian American Activist. After spending time in Detroit, MI and New Orleans, LA, the death of his father led his mother to move the family back to China. Returning to San Francisco, CA, he settled in Houston, TX in 1936. There, he started successful grocery stores and restaurants. He is noted as having served as National Grand President of the Chinese American Citizens Alliance (CACA), president of The Houston Lodge of the Chinese American Citizens Alliance (CACA), and president of The Houston Restaurant Association.

== Life ==
Albert Gee was born in 1920 in Detroit, MI. His family moved to New Orleans, LA for his father to run a laundromat business. When his father died in 1927, his mother moved the family back to Wing On (Hoi Ping County), Guangdong Province, China, as they felt life would be easier as his mother could not speak English. Nevertheless, his mother always imagined her children would eventually return to the US. In 1931, Gee returned to the US. He lived in San Francisco, CA with the help of his godfather, Uncle Tom. In 1936, he made his final move, to Houston, TX, where he would join his Uncle Harry Gee Sr. and settle down.

After supporting his uncle in his own restaurants (Main Café, Chinese Village Restaurants), Gee founded numerous grocery stores and restaurants in Houston, TX, including Gee's Kitchen, the Frying Pan, the Ding How, Chinese Oven, and Hong Kong Chef. Many of his restaurants served pan-Asian foods, connecting various Asian-American communities within Houston. Gee's restaurants also helped bring Chinese takeout to the American mainstream.

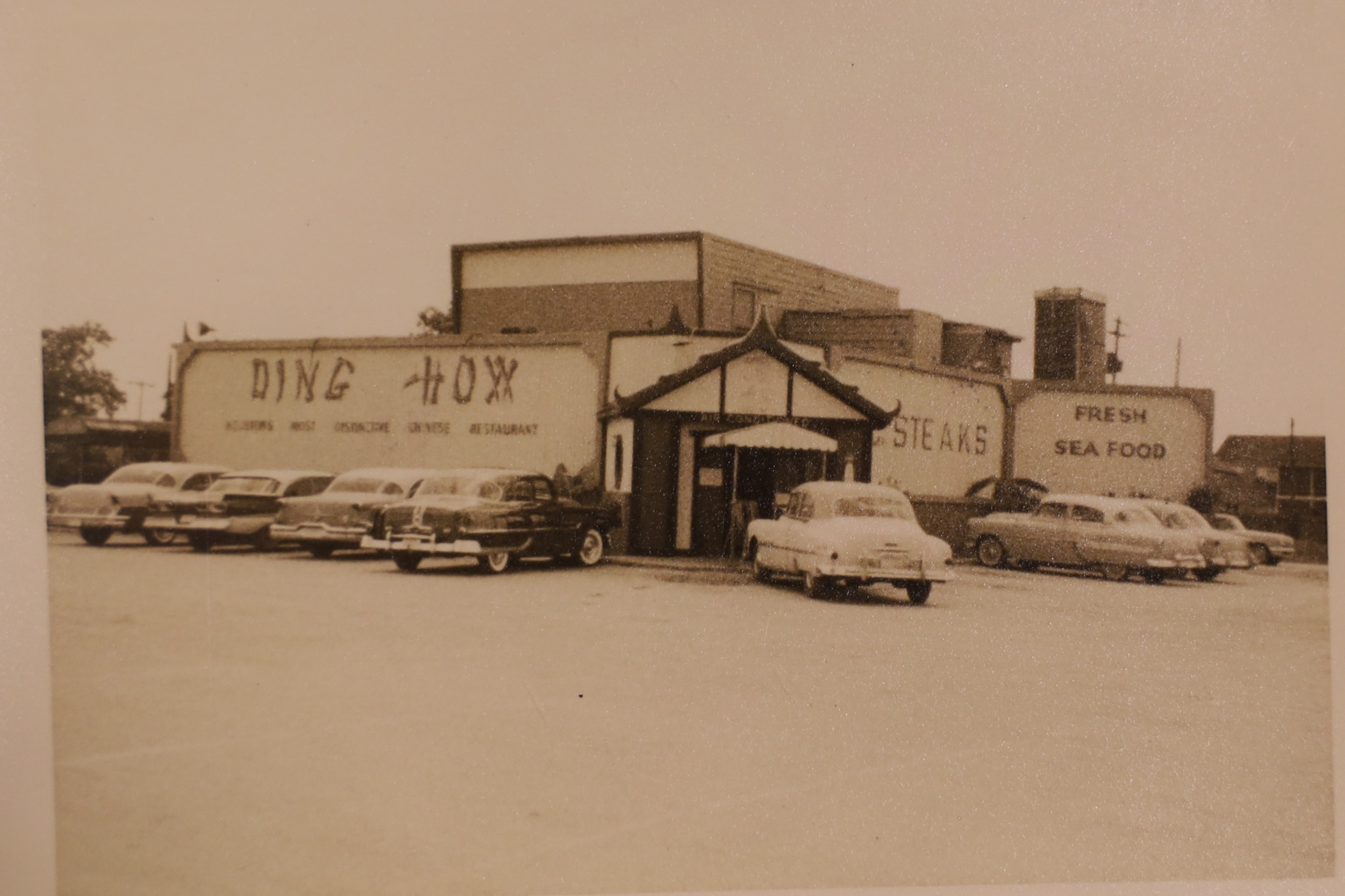

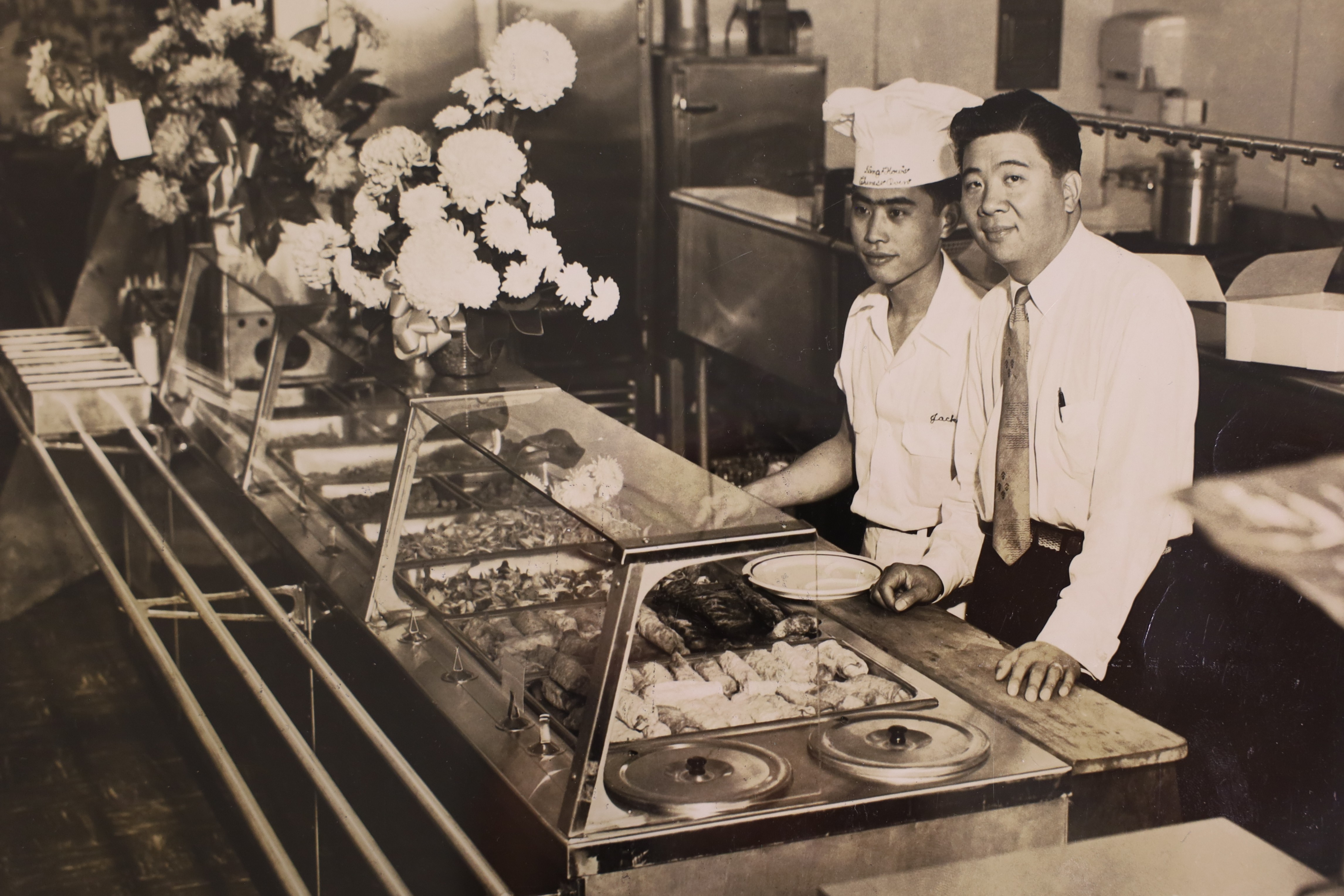

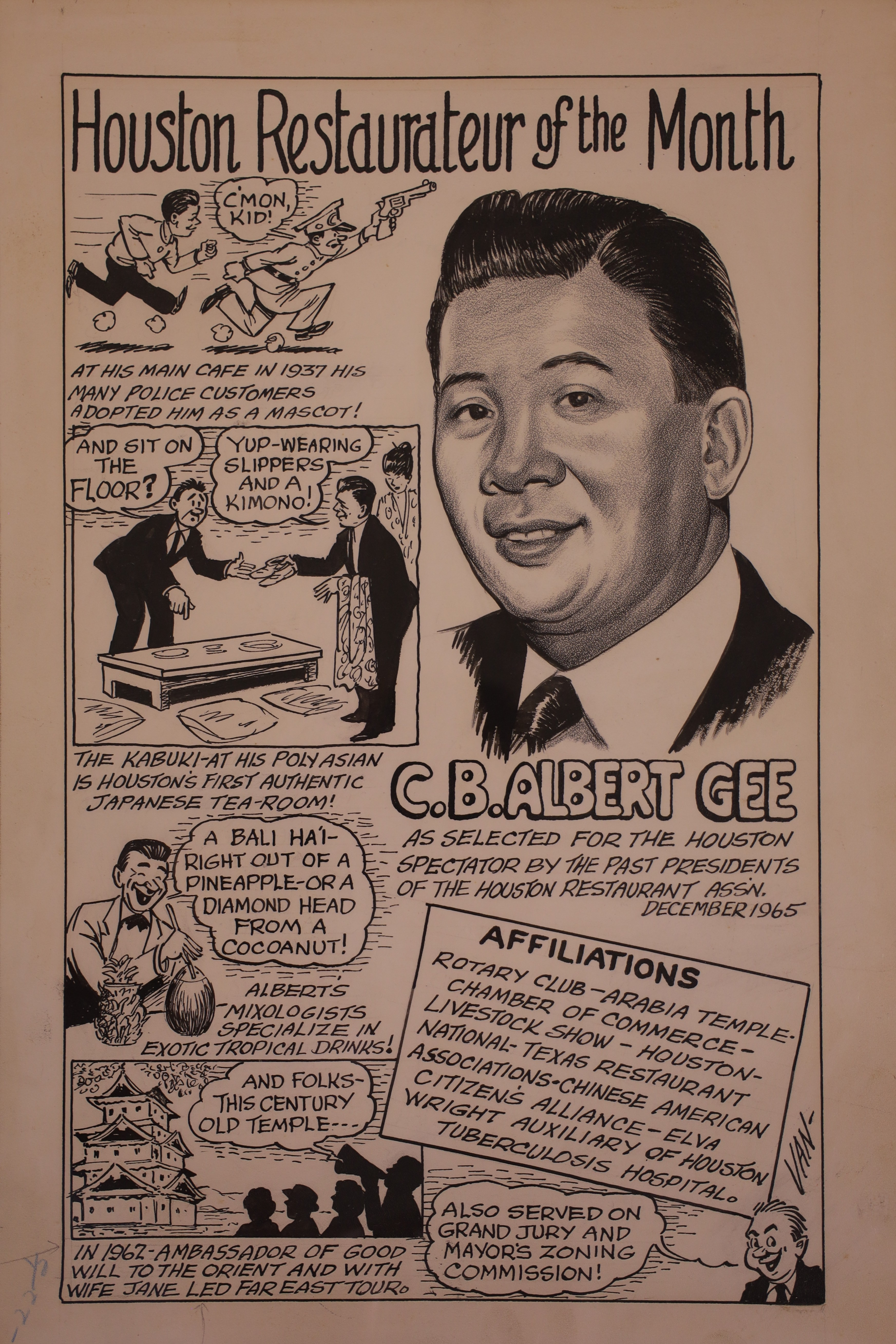

Gee served as the president of the Houston Restaurant Association from 1961 to 1962.

== Legacy ==
Gee's success also enabled him to rise to become a community activist within the Asian American community in Houston, TX. He served as the founder and first president of The Houston Lodge of the Chinese American Citizens Alliance (CACA). From this position, he rose in the ranks of the CACA, even serving as National Grand President. As of 1998, he is the only person outside of California to have serve in this role.

Gee supported Asian Americans in Houston and sponsored the immigration of people who held the last name Gee. Once in the United States, Gee would help them start their careers in the country. While Gee was alive, he hosted Gee family reunions at his largest restaurant, the Ding How, which became very crowded.

== Bibliography ==
- "Guide to the Linda Wu and Janita Gee records of the Gee family in Houston, 1955-2011, MS 878". txarchives.org. Retrieved 2026-03-29.
- "Collection: Linda Wu and Janita Gee records of the Gee family in Houston | ArchivesSpace Public Interface". archives.library.rice.edu. Retrieved 2026-03-29.
- Chao, Anne S. (2021-03-28). "Essay: Asian Americans' central role in Houston history". Houston Chronicle. Retrieved 2026-03-29.
- Rice University (2024-07-22). A living chronicle: Rice's Houston Asian American Archive documents community contributions. Retrieved 2026-03-29 – via YouTube.
- "The story of Chinese Americans who call Texas home". Voice of America. 2025-03-13. Retrieved 2026-03-29.
- The Texas Historical Comission (2021). The Medalion (PDF) (Fall 2021 ed.). Friends of the Texas Historical Commission.
- Harwell, Ph.D., Debbie Z. (March 2016). Houston History Magazine (PDF) (3 ed.). Houston, TX: Center for Public History at the University of Houston.
