= Warren I. Cohen =

American historian (1934–2025)

- Born: June 20, 1934; New York City, U.S.
- Died: April 30, 2025 (aged 90); Washington, D.C., U.S.
- Spouse: Nancy Bernkopf Tucker

Academic background
- Education: Columbia University (BA); Tufts University (MA); University of Washington (PhD)

Academic work
- Discipline: History of United States foreign policy
- Institutions: University of California, Riverside; Michigan State University; University of Maryland, Baltimore County

Warren Ira Cohen (June 20, 1934 – April 30, 2025) was an American historian of the foreign relations of the United States, especially relations with China. At his death he was Distinguished University Professor, Emeritus, at the University of Maryland, Baltimore County. Cohen was president of the Society for Historians of American Foreign Relations in 1984.

== Background ==
Cohen was born in Brooklyn, New York City on June 20, 1934. He received his B.A. from Columbia University in 1955, his master's degree from The Fletcher School at Tufts University, and his Ph.D. from the University of Washington. He taught at University of California, Riverside and Michigan State University before joining the faculty of the University of Maryland, Baltimore County. He was married to Janice Pritchard, June 22, 1957, but the marriage ended in divorce. He was married to diplomatic historian Nancy Bernkopf Tucker until her death.

Cohen died from pneumonia in Washington, D.C., on April 30, 2025, at the age of 90.

== Scholarship and contributions ==
Cohen specialized in the diplomatic history of the United States, especially relations with China. His America's Response to China first appeared in 1971, and went through six editions. He also wrote about the history of Chinese foreign policy.

Cohen was a member of The Committee on American-East Asian Relations, established by the American Historical Association in the mid-1960s. Scholars of United States diplomacy had been questioning the "Atlanticist" orientation of the field, studying foreign relations in isolation, and centering on influential "establishment: elites. The Committee found that standard surveys had been written in the 1920s and 1930s, using primarily English-language sources, and largely restricted to diplomatic relations. Led byAkira Iriye, Dorothy Borg, and Cohen, the Committee set out to reconceive relations across the Pacific by first encouraging use of multilingual sources on both sides of the ocean, using anthropology and cultural studies, and expanding to include cultural and ideological relations. When the Committee disbanded, Cohen was key in founding Journal of American-East Asian Relations, which carried on the Committee's program.

Cohen’s presidential address to the Society for the History of American Foreign Relations (SHAFR) presented the East Asian field as the “cutting edge” of historical scholarship. Cohen, along with Borg and Iriye, organized a series of historiographical conference that produced volumes of essays. In 1992 he published East Asian Art and American Culture, which explored the growth of East Asian art among wealthy collectors, dealers, and museums. Iriye had pushed him to write more on culture, but Cohen later wrote that the major force in writing was to save his marriage, as his wife was a studio artist. The book was a success, he felt, but his marriage was not.

Cohen served as a member and chaired the United States Department of State's Historical Advisory Committee until his resignation in 1990 in protest of the department's decision to expunge the role of the Central Intelligence Agency in 1953 Iranian coup d'état from its official publications.

In 2001 Cohen delivered Edwin O. Reischauer Lectures at Harvard University, published as The Asian American Century.

Cohen was the editor of The Cambridge History of American Foreign Relations.

== Selected publications ==
=== Articles ===
- Warren I. Cohen, "Who Fought the Japanese in Hunan? Some Views of China's War Effort," The Journal of Asian studies 27.1 (1967): 111-115.
- ---, "Review: New Light on the China Tangle?," Reviews in American History 1.2 (1973): 291-297. http://www.jstor.org/stable/2701052
- ---, "Who's Afraid of Alfred Kohlberg?," Reviews in American History 3.1 (1975): 118-123. http://www.jstor.org/stable/2700997
- ---, "The China Lobby," Encyclopedia of American Foreign Policy: Studies of the Principal Movements and Ideas (New York: Scribner, 1978).
- Cohen, Warren I. (1985). "The History of American-East Asian Relations: Cutting Edge of the Historical Profession". Diplomatic History. 9 (2): 101–112. doi:10.1111/j.1467-7709.1985.tb00525.x. JSTOR 10.1111/j.1467-7709.1985.tb00525.x.
- ---, "New Light on Dean Rusk? A Review Essay," Political Science Quarterly 106.1 (1991): 123–28. https://doi.org/10.2307/2152177. Cohen reviews his own Dean Rusk and As I Saw It, by Dean Rusk, Richard Rusk, Daniel S. Papp.
- ---, "Art Collecting as International Relations: Chinese Art and American Culture," Journal of American-East Asian Relations 1.4 (1992): 409-434. http://booksandjournals.brillonline.com/content/journals/10.1163/187656192x00087
- ---, "The Henry Luce Foundation and the Study of American-East Asian Relations," Journal of American-East Asian Relations 1.3 (Jan. 1992): 265-267. https://brill.com/view/journals/jaer/1/3/article-p265_1.xml
- Akira Iriye and, "Foreword," Journal of American-East Asian Relations 8 (1999): vii-viii. http://dx.doi.org/10.1163/187656199793654130
- ---, "Americanization of East Asia," Education About Asia 11.2 (2006): 26-29. https://www.asian-studies.org/EAA/EAA-Archives/11/2/677.pdf
- and Nancy Bernkopf Tucker, "AHR Forum: America in Asian Eyes," The American Historical Review 111.4 (2006).
- ---, "China's Rise in Historical Perspective," Journal of Strategic Studies 30.4 (2007): 683 - 704. http://www.informaworld.com/10.1080/01402390701431758
- ---, "Conversations with Chinese Friends: Zhou Enlai's Associates Reflect on Chinese–American Relations in the 1940s and the Korean War," Diplomatic History 11.3 (2007): 283-289. https://doi.org/10.1111/j.1467-7709.1987.tb00019.x
- * ——— (November 2, 2021), Diane Labrosse (ed.), Twists and Turns in the Life of a Very Lucky Man (PDF), Learning the Scholar’s Craft: Reflections of Historians and International Relations Scholars, H-DIPLO

=== Books and edited volumes ===
- Warren I. Cohen, ed., Intervention, 1917: Why America Fought (Heath, 1966).
- --- The American Revisionists: The Lessons of Intervention in World War I (Chicago: University of Chicago Press, 1967).
- ---The Chinese Connection: Roger S. Greene, Thomas W. Lamont, George E. Sokolsky and American-East Asian Relations. (New York: Columbia University Press, Studies of the East Asian Institute, 1978). ISBN 0231044445.
- ---. Dean Rusk. (Totowa, NJ: Cooper Square Publishers, The American Secretaries of State and Their Diplomacy 19, 1980). ISBN 0815405197.
- ---. ed., New Frontiers in American-East Asian Relations : Essays Presented to Dorothy Borg. (New York: Columbia University Press, Studies of the East Asian Institute, Columbia University, 1983). ISBN 0231056303.
- --- and Akira Iriye. The Great Powers in East Asia, 1953-1960. (New York: Columbia University Press, United States and Pacific Asia: Studies in Social, Economic, and Political Interaction., 1990). ISBN 0231071744.
- Akira Iriye and. ed., American, Chinese, and Japanese Perspectives on Wartime Asia, 1931-1949. (Wilmington, Del: SR Books, America in the Modern World: Studies in International History, 1990). ISBN 084202347X
- ——— (1992). East Asian Art and American Culture : A Study in International Relations. New York: Columbia University Press. ISBN 0231076444.
- ---. Pacific Passage : The Study of American-East Asian Relations on the Eve of the Twenty-First Century. (New York: Columbia University Press, 1996). ISBN 0231104065.
- ---. East Asia at the Center: Four Thousand Years of Engagement with the World. (New York: Columbia University Press, 2000). ISBN 0231101082.
- ---. The Asian American Century. (Cambridge, MA: Harvard University Press, 2002). ISBN 0674007654.
- ---. America's Response to China : A History of Sino-American Relations. (New York: Columbia University Press, 6th 2019). ISBN 9780231191982.
