= Macho like Me =

- Directed by: Helie Lee, Sammie Wayne
- Starring: Helie Lee
- Release date: October 9, 2010 (DC APA Film Festival)
- Running time: 75 minutes
- Country: United States
- Language: English

Macho like Me is a documentary film directed and performed by Helie Lee. She performs a social experiment where she by cutting her hair and changing her wardrobe to men's clothes transforming her appearance from an established woman into a "man", and takes a step into the masculine world. The documentary is a mix of raw documentary footage and a live presentation, and was presented at SDAFF and DC APA in 2010.

== Plot ==
In the documentary she gets help from her friends Anna and Katie and shows the whole process of the transformation into a man named "Harry", a role which then lasts for 6 months. While she initially is excited by what the male life has to offer, she soon faces difficulties having to suppress her emotions and having a constant fear of being regarded as a homosexual. She then runs into an awkward and near disastrous episode with a few macho guys. During a party at the Playboy Mansion she starts to see that men have it harder than she had ever imagined, and her views on men privileges and relationships are tested.

== Motivation and experience ==
Her motivation for making the documentary was many stranded relationships with men together with a stereotypical view that men have it easier in life than women after growing up with her brother being "treated like a crown prince, while she and her sister were judged purely on their marital prospects". So Lee sets out to see if the grass is greener on the other side having the view to want to prove that men have it better than women with all the strength and freedom she attributes them. It turns out, though, that she gets a new view that surprises her, as her experience as a man returns her surprising conclusions that makes her question the gender roles and the true meaning of being a "woman" or "man". What started out as a critique of male-gender advantages turns into an unexpected personal enlightenment in which she deconstructs the male identity and portrays all types of men on the verge of nervous breakdowns.
