= Nancy Bernkopf Tucker =

American diplomatic historian

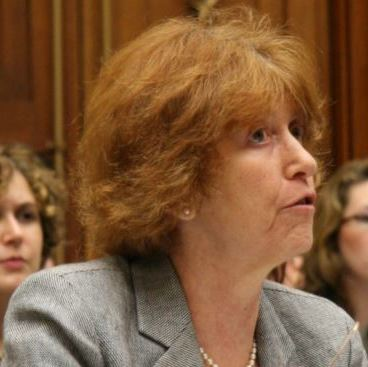
- Nancy Bernkopf Tucker (2011)
- Born: July 12, 1948; New York City, U.S.
- Died: December 1, 2012 (aged 64); Potomac, Maryland, U.S.
- Education: Hobart and William Smith Colleges; Columbia University
- Occupations: Diplomat, historian
- Spouse: Warren I. Cohen

Nancy Bernkopf Tucker (July 12, 1948 – December 1, 2012) was an American diplomat, writer and diplomatic historian of the Georgetown University, specializing in American-East Asian relations, particularly United States relations with China, Taiwan and Hong Kong. She had distinguished meritorious service as the first Assistant Deputy Director of National Intelligence for Analytic Integrity and Standards and Analytic Ombudsman in the Office of the Director of National Intelligence, for which she was awarded the National Intelligence Medal of Achievement in 2007. She also served in the Department of State for several assignments including those in the Office of Chinese Affairs, Bureau of East Asian and Pacific Affairs and the U.S. Embassy Beijing.

== Early life and education ==
Born in New York City, Tucker earned a Bachelor of Arts at Hobart and William Smith Colleges in 1970, Certificate of the East Asian Institute and Master of Arts in Chinese history at Columbia University in 1973, a Master of Philosophy in American East Asian relations at Columbia University in 1976, and a Ph.D. in American East Asian relations at Columbia in 1980.

== Career ==
After earning her doctorate, Tucker was on Colgate University's faculty for seven years before she went to Georgetown University. She wrote several books, the first of which changed historians' views of how the Cold War originated in Asia. Additionally, she edited and contributed to other books and wrote articles and essays that appeared in academic journals.

== Personal life ==
Tucker was married to Warren Cohen, a historian. She died of cancer on December 1, 2012, aged 64, at her residence in Potomac, Maryland.

== Legacy ==
In February 2016, Columbia University Press announced creation of the Nancy Bernkopf Tucker and Warren I. Cohen Books on American East Asian Relations series in honor of Tucker and her husband. The series is designed "to publish high-quality, rigorously researched works in the academic fields in which Tucker was involved." Tucker donated money toward that goal before her death, and Cohen subsequently completed the plans.

== Published works ==
- Patterns in the Dust: Chinese-American Relations and the Recognition Controversy,1949-1950. New York.: Columbia University Press. 1983. ISBN 978-0231053624.
- Uncertain Friendships: Taiwan, Hong Kong and the United States: 1945-1992. Cambridge, Massachusetts.: Macmillan/Twayne. 1994. ISBN 978-0805792249.
- Strait Talk: US-Taiwan Relations and the Crisis with China. Cambridge, Massachusetts.: Harvard University Press. 2009. ISBN 9780674031876.
- The China Threat: Memories, Myths, and Realities in the 1950s. New York: Columbia University Press. 2012. ISBN 978-0-231-15924-1.
