= Dorothy Borg =

American historian (1902–1993)

- Born: September 4, 1902; Elberon, New Jersey, U.S.
- Died: October 21, 1993 (aged 91); New York City, U.S.
- Occupation: Historian
- Awards: Bancroft Prize (1965)

Dorothy Borg (September 4, 1902 Elberon, New Jersey – October 21, 1993 New York City) was an American historian specializing in American-East Asian relations. Although she did not hold faculty appointments, her multi-archival and assiduous scholarship set high standards and her organization of international scholarly cooperation and exchange influenced the field of American history of foreign relations. Her research focused mainly on United States relations with China in the decades between World War I and the arrival in power of the Chinese Communist Revolution in 1949.

== Awards ==
- She received the 1965 Bancroft Prize for her monograph, The United States and the Far Eastern Crisis, 1933-1938.

== Works ==
- American Policy and the Chinese Revolution, 1925-1928 (New York: American Institute of Pacific Relations; Macmillan, 1947; rpr. New York: Octagon, 1968.
- The United States and the Far Eastern Crisis, 1933-1938 (Harvard University Press, 1965)
- Dorothy Borg; Shumpei Okamoto, eds. (1973). Pearl Harbor as History: Japanese-American Relations, 1931-1941. Columbia University Press. ISBN 978-0-231-03890-4.
- Dorothy Borg; Waldo H. Heinrichs, eds. (1980). Uncertain Years: Chinese American Relations, 1947-1950. Columbia University Press. ISBN 978-0-231-04738-8.

== References and further reading ==
- Warren I. Cohen, ed. (April 25, 2022), Forum on the Importance of the Scholarship of Dorothy Borg (PDF) Essays by Warren I. Cohen, Lloyd C. Gardner, Akira Iriye.
