= Wallace T. MacCaffrey =

American historian and academic (1920-2013)

- Born: Wallace Trevethic MacCaffrey; April 20, 1920
- Died: December 13, 2013 (aged 93); Cambridge, England
- Occupations: Historian and academic
- Spouse: Isobel Gamble (m. 1956; died 1978)

Academic background
- Education: Eastern Oregon College of Education
- Alma mater: Reed College; Harvard University; Churchill College, Cambridge

Academic work
- Discipline: History
- Sub-discipline: Early modern Britain; Social history; Political history; Urban history
- Institutions: Reed College; University of California, Los Angeles; Haverford College; Harvard University; Trinity Hall, Cambridge

Wallace Trevethic MacCaffrey (April 20, 1920 – December 13, 2013) was Professor Emeritus of History at Harvard University. He was a graduate of Reed College and Harvard University. He also taught at the University of California, Los Angeles and Haverford College. Among his awards is a Guggenheim fellowship. He was a leading scholar of Elizabethan England, best known for his trilogy of books, The Shaping of the Elizabethan Regime (1968), Queen Elizabeth and the Making of Policy, 1572-1588 (1981) and Elizabeth I: War and Politics, 1588-1603 (1992).

He died, aged 93, on 13 December 2013 at Addenbrooke's Hospital, Cambridge, following a short illness and is buried at St Andrew's church, Girton.

== Chairmanships at Harvard ==
MacCaffrey served as the Harvard History chair twice, and presided over a period of turmoil in the department.

== Reed donation ==
He gave Reed College a $1 million donation in 2006.

== Bibliography ==
- Exeter, 1540-1640: The Growth of an English County Town (Harvard University Press, 1958)
- The Shaping of the Elizabethan Regime: Elizabethan Politics, 1558-1572 (Princeton University Press, 1968)
- William Camden, History of the Most Renowned and Victorious Princess Elizabeth, Late Queen of England (editor; University of Chicago Press, 1970)
- Queen Elizabeth and the Making of Policy, 1572-1588 (Princeton University Press, 1981)
- Elizabeth I (Edward Arnold, 1993)
- Elizabeth I: War and Politics, 1588-1603 (Princeton University Press, 1994)
