= James C. Thomson Jr. =

American historian

James Claude "Jim" Thomson Jr. (b. Princeton, New Jersey, September 14, 1931, d. August 11, 2002) was an American historian and journalist who served in the government, taught at Harvard and Boston Universities, served as curator of the Neiman Foundation for Journalism.

== Early life ==
Born in Princeton, New Jersey when his parents were on home leave from China, where his father taught chemistry at Nanjing University. He spent most of his youth in Nanjing. In Nanjing, his mother was neighbor and good friend of Pearl S. Buck, whom he called "Aunt Pearl." His siblings were Anne (Nancy), Sydney, and John, and he was a friend and brother in law to theologian Robert McAfee Brown, Sydney's husband.

Thomson returned to the United States to become a student at Lawrenceville School. He returned briefly to China to travel with a friend, Winthrop Knowlton, in the summer of 1948, when Mao Zedong's revolution was gathering force. In 1953 he graduated with a B.A. from Yale University, where he was editor of the Yale Daily News and elected to Phi Beta Kappa. As a Yale-Clare Fellow at Cambridge University, he received a B.A. in history in 1955, and an M.A. in 1959. He received his Ph.D. in history from Harvard University in 1961 under the direction of John K. Fairbank. He married Diana Butler in 1959.

== Career in politics and teaching ==
Thomson was a member of the Democratic Party, and served as an assistant to Senator Chester Bowles of Connecticut during the Adlai Stevenson presidential campaign of 1956. Bowles invited Thomson to be an advisor when he joined the Kennedy administration. In the Johnson administrations Thomson was China specialist on the staff of the National Security Council headed by McGeorge Bundy. In May 1964 he was involved in drafting what would eventually become the Gulf of Tonkin Resolution. He later called the original idea "fairly benign," yet it was shelved in June of that year due to the threat of a congressional filibuster. In 1966, he resigned in protest of the Vietnam War.

He then became a lecturer in history at Harvard University. He taught a popular undergraduate course in American-East Asian Relations. In 1972 he was appointed curator (or head) of Harvard's Nieman Foundation for Journalism. He then taught at Boston University from 1984 until 1997. He continued to publish both academic and journalistic work. His article "How Could Vietnam Happen?" in the April 1968 Atlantic Magazine examined and condemned American involvement in Vietnam in terms of State Department bureaucratic politics, the purging of expertise in the McCarthy era, and Democratic administration remembrance of the "loss of China" charges.

== Scholarly publications and activities ==
Thomson's doctoral dissertation, finished while he was serving in Washington, was published in 1969 by Harvard University Press, While China Faced West: American Reformers in Nationalist China, 1928-1937. The book describes the efforts of American oriented reformers to provide China with effective political and social change, especially the Rural Reconstruction Movement. One reviewer noted that "Using a clear and often pretty prose style, Thomson skillfully blends his own deep and personal interest in the fate of these projects with a willingness to examine the political contradictions the work entailed.

After his return to Cambridge, he supported the efforts of John Fairbank and others to form the Committee on American-East Asian Relations under the aegis of the American Historical Association. He and Ernest May edited American-East Asian Relations: A Survey. (Cambridge: Harvard University Press, 1972), a series of essays from a conference in Cuernavaca, Mexico, which assessed the state of the field of American relations with Asia. In 1981, he co-wrote Sentimental Imperialists: The American Experience in East Asia, with Peter W. Stanley and John Curtis Perry. Thomson drew upon this youthful acquaintance in writing "Pearl S. Buck and the American Quest for China" for a conference celebrating Buck's centennial. In it, he describes Buck as the most influential writer on China since Marco Polo

His death in 2002, two years after his wife's, was due to a heart attack. Both of their funerals were held in the Memorial Church of Harvard University, and they are both buried in Heath, Massachusetts.

== Selected publications ==
=== Books and edited volumes ===
- ---, While China Faced West: American Reformers in Nationalist China, 1928-1937 (Cambridge: Harvard University Press; Harvard East Asian Series 38, 1969)
- Ernest R. May, and James Claude Thomson, eds., American-East Asian Relations: A Survey (Cambridge, Mass.,: Harvard University Press, 1972).

=== Articles and chapters ===
- ---, "Dragon under Glass: Time for a New China Policy," Atlantic Monthly (October 1967):
- ---, "How Could Vietnam Happen? An Autopsy," Atlantic Monthly (April 1968)
- ---, "A Cycle of Cathay," American Heritage 23.5 (1972)
- ---, "On the Making of U.S. China Policy, 1961-9: A Study in Bureaucratic Politics," China Quarterly 50 (1972)
- ---, "The Role of the Department of State," in Dorothy Borg, Shumpei Okamoto and with the assistance of Dale K. A. Finlayson, ed., Pearl Harbor as History: Japanese-American Relations, 1931-1941 (New York: Columbia University Press; 1973), 81–106.
- ---, "Refugee in New England," New England Journal of Public Policy 4.2 (1988):
- ---, "Pearl S. Buck and the American Quest for China," in Frances E. Webb Elizabeth Johnston Lipscomb, Peter J. Conn, ed., The Several Worlds of Pearl S. Buck: Essays Presented at a Centennial Symposium, Randolph-Macon Woman's College, March 26–28, 1992 (Westport, CT: Greenwood Press; 1994): 7–15.
