= Helie Lee =

American writer (born 1964)

- Born: August 29, 1964 (age 61); Seoul, South Korea
- Education: University of California, Los Angeles (BA)

Korean name
- Hangul: 이혜리
- RR: I Hyeri
- MR: I Hyeri

Helie Lee (born August 29, 1964) is an American writer and university lecturer who has also made a documentary film.

== Early life ==
Lee was born on August 29, 1964, in Seoul, South Korea. Her family moved to Montreal, Quebec, Canada when she was four years old. A year later, they emigrated to the United States, settling in California. She attended El Camino Real High School and graduated from UCLA in 1986 with a Bachelor of Arts degree in Political Science.

== Activism ==
Lee became active in raising awareness of human rights issues for North Korean defectors. In 2002, she testified before the Senate Subcommittee Hearing on Immigration to urge increased American support for North Korean refugees.

== Books ==
=== Still Life With Rice ===
Still Life With Rice is a novel written by Helie Lee, and published in 1997 by Simon & Schuster. It is based on accounts of suffering due to war and child abuse. Although it is written by Helie Lee, the book is mostly written from the viewpoint of Lee's grandmother, Hongyong Baek. In the book, Lee expresses her annoyance for the way her mother and grandmother think she is too Americanized, and should be more Korean. It was described by Booklist as having "great narrative power".

=== In the Absence of Sun ===
In her second book, In the Absence of Sun (1998), Lee recounts her family's experiences in helping her uncle escape from North Korea.

== Other works ==
In 2010, she released a documentary called Macho Like Me, in which she "doffs all signifiers of femininity to live as a man". A review in the LA Weekly panned the "cutsey one–woman-show framing device" but stated that the experiences that "upend [Lee's] preconceptions, mak[e] for engrossing viewing."

== Selected works ==
- Still Life With Rice, Simon & Schuster, 1997.
- In the Absence of Sun, Harmony, 1998.
