= Macau–United States relations =

- Macau: United States

Macau–United States relations are bilateral relations between Macau and the United States.

== Political relationship ==
In recognition of Macau's high degree of autonomy, the United States continues to treat Macau as a "special area" distinct from the People's Republic of China: e. g., the sanctions imposed on China after the June 1989 violence in Tiananmen Square do not apply to Macau. For the DV-Lottery, those who were born in Mainland China are not eligible to apply, whereas persons born in Macau are qualified.

The U.S. government supports Macau's autonomy by strengthening bilateral ties through the promotion of bilateral trade and investment, law enforcement cooperation, academic and cultural links, and high-level dialogue and visits.

After the September 11 attacks, Macau officials pledged full cooperation with the U.S. and global efforts against terrorism. The legislature passed an anti-terrorism law in April 2002 that includes provisions that are consistent with the requirements of UN Security Council Resolution 1373.

== Economic relations ==
Macau's clothes and textiles continued to enter the United States under quotas separated from those of China. Under the terms of a September 2000 bilateral Memorandum of Understanding, Macau and the US government cooperate in enforcing textile quotas and preventing illegal trans-shipment. The US continued periodic visits by U.S. Customs Textile Production Verification Teams to ensure compliance with Macau bilateral textile commitments.

The protection of intellectual property rights remains a priority issue on the U.S.-Macau bilateral economic agenda. Macau's progress since 1999 in strengthening IPR laws, tightening controls over DVD and VCD manufacturing, and stepping up street-level IPR enforcement resulted in Macau being removed from USTR's Special 301 list in 2002. Macau's new customs service worked with U.S. industry associations and maintained high tempo operations to combat piracy .

U.S. investment in Macau, while small in the past, is expected to increase in the coming years as the result of the 2002 awarding of two gaming concessions to consortia with U.S. interests. Though trade with Macau represents a small portion of U.S. trade, the United States was Macau's second-largest trading partner after the People's Republic of China. U.S. exports to and imports from Macau in 2002 were US$79 million and US$1.2 billion, respectively. After the Macau government ended the 40-year-old gaming monopoly of the Sociedade de Turismo e Diversões de Macau (STDM) in February 2002, the government awarded concessions to three consortia, including two with significant U.S. investment. The restructuring of the gaming industry remains the centerpiece of Macau - efforts to improve its international reputation and become a Las Vegas-like gaming, convention, and family-oriented holiday destination. The possible new investment of US$1.5-2.5 billion in the medium term will increase jobs and income and dramatically raise the U.S. business profile in Macau. US investment in Macau is largely centered on gambling, with five out of thirteen of Macau's casinos being owned by US companies.

== Offices and officials ==
The U.S. Government has no offices in Macau. U.S. interests are represented by the Consulate General of the United States in Hong Kong.

Macau has two tourist offices in the United States in Los Angeles and New York City.

== See also ==
- Foreign relations of Macau
- Foreign relations of the United States
