= East Asia–United States relations =

Multilateral relations

East Asia–United States relations covers American relations with the region as a whole, as well as summaries of relations with China, Japan, Korea, Taiwan, and smaller places. It includes diplomatic, military, economic, social, and cultural ties. The emphasis is on historical developments.

== Main countries ==
| Country | Formal Relations Began | Notes |
|---|---|---|
| People's Republic of China | 1844 (Qing); 1979 (PRC) | See China–United States relations, China–United States trade war and Artificial Intelligence Cold War American relations with the People's Republic of China cycled from very hostile (1949–1970), friendly with growing trade (1970–2015), and hostile again (2016–present). A great amount of trade between the two countries necessitates positive political relations, although occasional disagreements over tariffs, currency exchange rates and the Political status of Taiwan do occur. The U.S. criticizes China on human rights issues and in recent years like the mass detaining of Uyghurs and Kazakhs in Xinjiang or the cultural assimilation of Mongols and Tibetans under the general secretaryship of Xi Jinping. China has criticized the United States on human rights in return also. The United States acknowledges the People's Republic's One-China policy. The relations deteriorated sharply under Donald Trump, who launched a trade war against China, banned US companies from selling equipment to Huawei, increased visa restrictions on Chinese students and scholars and designated China as a "currency manipulator". |
| Hong Kong; Macau | 1992; 1999 | See Hong Kong–United States relations and Macau–United States relations See United States–Hong Kong Policy Act and United States–Macau Policy Act |
| Republic of China | 1844 (Qing); 1911 (ended 1979); 1979 (Taiwan Relations Act - unofficial) | See Taiwan–United States relations The U.S. recognized the Nationalist Government as the legitimate government of all of China throughout the Chinese Civil War. The U.S. continued to recognize the Republic of China until 1979, when it shifted its recognition to the People's Republic of China in accordance with the One China policy. The U.S. continued to provide Taiwan with military aid after 1979, and continued informal relations through the American Institute in Taiwan, and is considered to be a strong Asian ally and supporter of the United States. |
| Japan | 1854, 1952 | See Japan–United States relations The relationship began in the 1850s as the U.S. was a major factor in forcing Japan to resume contacts with the outer world beyond a very restricted role. In the late 19th century the Japanese sent many delegations to Europe, and some to the U.S., to discover and copy the latest technology and thereby modernize Japan very rapidly and allow it to build its own empire. There was some friction over control of Hawaii and the Philippines, but Japan stood aside as the U.S. annexed those lands in 1898. Likewise the U.S. did not object when Japan took control of Korea. The two nations cooperated with the European powers in suppressing the Boxer Rebellion in China in 1900, but the U.S. was increasingly troubled about Japan's denial of the Open Door Policy that would ensure that all nations could do business with China on an equal basis. President Theodore Roosevelt admired Japan's strength as it defeated a major European power, Russia. He brokered an end to the war between Russia and Japan in 1905–6. Anti-Japanese sentiment (especially on the West Coast) soured relations in the 1907–24 era. In the 1930s the U.S. protested vehemently against Japan's seizure of Manchuria (1931), its war against China (1937–45), and its seizure of Indochina (Vietnam) 1940–41. American sympathies were with China and Japan rejected increasingly angry American demands that Japan pull out of China. The two nations fought an all-out war 1941–45; the U.S. won a total victory, with heavy bombing (including two atomic bombs on Hiroshima and Nagasaki) that devastated Japan's 50 largest industrial cities. The American army under Douglas MacArthur occupied and ruled Japan, 1945–51, with the successful goal of sponsoring a peaceful, prosperous and democratic nation. In 1951, the U.S. and Japan signed Treaty of San Francisco and Security Treaty Between the United States and Japan, subsequently revised as Treaty of Mutual Cooperation and Security between the United States and Japan in 1960, relations since then have been excellent. The United States considers Japan to be one of its closest allies, and it is both a Major Non-NATO ally and NATO contact country. The United States has several military bases in Japan including Yokosuka, which harbors the U.S. 7th Fleet. The JSDF, or Japanese Self Defense Force, cross train with the U.S. Military, often providing auxiliary security and conducting war games. |
| Mongolia | 1987 | See Mongolia–United States relations |
| North Korea | Only Informal Relations | See North Korea–United States relations The United States and North Korea do not have diplomatic relations. |
| South Korea | 1882 (Joseon); 1949 (Republic) | See South Korea–United States relations South Korea–United States relations have been most extensive since 1945, when the United States helped establish capitalism in South Korea and led the UN-sponsored Korean War against North Korea and China (1950–53). South Korea's rapid economic growth, democratization and modernization greatly reduced its U.S. dependency. Large numbers of U.S. forces remain in Korea. On September 24, 2018, President Donald Trump signed the United States-South Korea Trade Deal with South Korean President Moon Jae-in. |

== History ==
=== Japan ===
The relationship between the United States and Japan was minimal before 1853 due to Japan's self-imposed isolation from the world, which lasted over two centuries. The Japanese government issued the "Sakoku" policy in 1633, prohibiting foreigners from entering Japan and Japanese from leaving the country under penalty of death. In the 1850s, the US and other Western countries started to demand more access to Japan for trade and diplomacy. This led to Commodore Matthew C. Perry's arrival with his "Black Ships" in 1853. Japan complied with the Bakumatsu. It opened its ports to foreign vessels and signed treaties with the West, such as the Treaty of Amity and Commerce (United States–Japan), called the Harris Treaty of 1858.

Revolutionary changes inside Japan during the Meiji Restoration that began in 1868 led to very rapid modernization, industrialization and eagerness to learn from and trade with the U.S. and Europe. Trade expanded rapidly. The US played an essential role in this transformation, providing technology, higher education, and political guidance. The U.S. also sent missionaries, but they made few converts.

=== Better travel opportunities ===
The opportunities for fast steamship travel from San Francisco improved dramatically in the second half of the 19th century. The first regular steamship route carried passengers, freight and mail to Yokohama in 1867. The transcontinental railroad opened in 1869 and service was expanded to China and the South Pacific. The US Post Office subsidized it to carry the mail and only one line of steamers connected the U.S. to Japan in 1885, but by 1898 there were six. The trip to Yokohama took 22 days in 1886, and only 12 days in 1898, and the rates for passenger and freight continued to fall.

=== Southeast Asia ===
Early American entry into what was then called the East Indies was low key. In 1795, a secret voyage for pepper set sail from Salem, Massachusetts on an 18-month voyage that returned with a bulk cargo of pepper, the first to be so imported into the country, which sold at a profit of seven hundred per cent. In 1831, the merchantman Friendship of Salem returned to report the ship had been plundered, and the first officer and two crewmen murdered in Sumatra. The Anglo-Dutch Treaty of 1824 obligated the Dutch to ensure the safety of shipping and overland trade in and around Aceh, and they accordingly sent the Royal Netherlands East Indies Army on the punitive expedition of 1831. President Andrew Jackson also ordered America's first Sumatran punitive expedition of 1832, which was followed by a second punitive expedition in 1838. The Friendship incident thus afforded the Dutch a reason to take over Aceh; and Jackson, to dispatch diplomatist Edmund Roberts, who in 1833 secured the Roberts Treaty with Siam. In 1856, negotiations for amendment of this treaty, Townsend Harris stated the position of the United States:

The United States does not hold any possessions in the East, nor does it desire any. The form of government forbids the holding of colonies. The United States therefore cannot be an object of jealousy to any Eastern Power. Peaceful commercial relations, which give as well as receive benefits, is what the President wishes to establish with Siam, and such is the object of my mission.

== China ==
=== Opium trade ===
British merchants, protected by the Royal Navy, dominated the opium trade in China. The opium was grown in India – then under British control – and sold by British merchants to Chinese wholesalers in China. The Chinese government protested, two wars resulted, with decisive victories by the British. The Americans did only 1/10 as much opium business in China, but showed more ingenuity in developing sources, and building a network of Chinese merchants. The British had a monopoly on the Indian supply, but the Americans relied more on Turkey, and circumvented Chinese restrictions by smuggling to local merchants in the Portuguese colony of Macau while the Chinese government was focused exclusively on the British in Canton. In effect the British Navy protected the American interests, and American merchants received protection from the unequal treaties that China was forced to sign with the British. American merchant Peter Snow was based in Canton, but his business was not highly profitable. On the other hand, he served as the U.S. consul there in the late 1830s and early 1840s. He proved efficient and effective in protecting American business interests during the opium crisis of 1839–40. The Chinese government saw him the Americans as a counterweight to the British. The Americans opportunistically took advantage of British victories and gain the same privileges without using or threatening to use its military. The emerging American policy was equal opportunity for all nations, which by 1900 became the "open door" policy. The main American activity in China saw merchants unloaded their opium in Portuguese Macau, and purchase tea, silk and China in Canton. Most of the Americans were based in Salem Massachusetts, and after 1840 they suddenly gave up the international trade, and invested their profits in new textile factories in New England. There were practically no opportunities to invest in China itself, so the American presence dropped off sharply. All the remained was a nostalgic image of a friendly China that probably encouraged missionary activities in the late 1840s.

=== Extraterritorial rights ===
Under the 1844 Treaty of Wanghia, negotiated by U.S. minister Caleb Cushing, American businessmen were restricted to the designated international districts in designated port cities. They were exempt from Chinese courts and were instead under the legal jurisdiction of American officials. These extraterritorial rights lasted until 1943. The treaty represented an American challenge to British dominance. China made similar treaties with Japan and the Western powers in order to block a British takeover of the Chinese market. American missionaries were allowed anywhere.

=== Missionaries in China ===
British Protestant churches took the lead in establishing a missionary role in China, especially with the China Inland Mission. The American program was smaller, but it had a certain impact on China, and even more so on the United States.

Local government officials, all steeped in Confucianism, took a hostile view of Christianity, so converts were few and from the social fringe. Much more important was the impact on medicine and education. Peter Parker (1804–1888) in Canton (Guangzhou) was the most influential American missionary doctor. John Kerr (1824-1901) in 1859 established the Boji Hospital in Canton as one of the most influential hospitals in China. He established a medical school and prepared textbooks and journal articles to introduce Western medicine in depth. By 1937, British and American missionaries operated 300 church hospitals, with 21,000 beds, as well as 600 small clinics. The American missionary community could boast of hundreds of primary and secondary schools, topped off by 13 Protestant and three Catholic universities. The capstones were Yenching University and Peking Union Medical College.

American missionaries had an audience at home who listen closely to their first-hand accounts. Around 1900 there were on average about 300 China missionaries on furlough back home, and they presented their case to church groups perhaps 30,000 times a year, reaching several million churchgoers. They were suffused with optimism that sooner or later China would be converted to Christianity. By the 1920s, however, the mainline Protestant churches realize that conversions were not happening, despite all the schools and hospitals. Furthermore, they had come to appreciate the ethical and cultural values of a different civilization, and began to doubt their own superiority. The mainline Protestant denomination missionary work declined rapidly. In their place came a growing role for Chinese Christians. Furthermore, there was an influx of fundamentalist, Pentecostal and Jehovah Witness missionaries who remained committed to the conversion process.

Novelist Pearl S. Buck (1892–1973) was raised in a bilingual environment in China by her missionary parents. China was the setting for many of her best-selling novels and stories, which explored the hardships, and the depth of humanity of the people she loved, and considered fully equal. After college in the United States, she returned to China as a Presbyterian missionary 1914 to 1932. She taught English at the college level. The Good Earth (1931) was her best-selling novel, and a popular movie. Along with numerous other books and articles she reached a large middle-class American audience with a highly sympathetic view of China. The Nobel Prize committee for literature hailed her, "for the notable works which pave the way to a human sympathy passing over widely separated racial boundaries and for the studies of human ideals which are a great and living art of portraiture."

No one had more influence on American political thinking about foreign policy than Henry R. Luce (1898-1967), founder and publisher of Time, Life and Fortune magazines from the 1920s to his death. He was born to missionary parents in China, and educated there until age 15. His Chinese experience made a deep impression, and his publications always gave large scale favorable attention to China. He gave some very strong support to Chiang Kai-shek in his battles against Mao Zedong.

The politically most influential returning missionary was Walter Judd (1898-1994) Who served 10 years is a medical missionary in Fujian 1925-1931 and 1934–1938. On his return to Minnesota, he became an articulate spokesman denouncing the Japanese aggression against China, explaining it in terms of Japan's scarcity of raw materials and markets, population pressure, and the disorder and civil war in China. According to biographer Yanli Gao:

Judd was both a Wilsonian moralist and a Jacksonian protectionist, whose efforts were driven by a general Christian understanding of human beings, as well as a missionary complex. As he appealed simultaneously to American national interests and a popular Christian moral conscience, the Judd experience demonstrated that determined courageous advocacy by missionaries did in fact help to shape an American foreign policy needing to be awakened from its isolationist slumbers." Judd served two decades in Congress 1943-1962 as a Republican, where he was a highly influential spokesman on Asian affairs generally and especially China. He was a liberal missionary and a but a conservative anti-Communist congressman who defined the extent of American support for the Chiang Kai-shek regime.

=== 1905 Chinese boycott ===
In response to severe restrictions on Chinese immigration to the United States, the overseas Chinese living in the United States organized a boycott whereby people in China refuse to purchase American products. The project was organized by a reform organization based in the United States, Baohuang Hui. Unlike the reactionary Boxers, these reformers were modernizers. The Manchu government had supported the Boxers, but these reformers—of whom Sun Yat-sen was representative, opposed the government. The boycott was put into effect by merchants and students in south and central China. It made only a small economic impact, because China bought few American products apart from Standard Oil's kerosene. Washington was outraged and treated the boycott as a Boxer-like violent attack, and demanded the Peking government stop it or else. President Theodore Roosevelt asked Congress for special funding for a naval expedition. Washington refused to consider softening the exclusion laws because it responded to deep-seated anti-Chinese prejudices that were widespread especially on the West Coast. It now began to denounce Chinese nationalism. The impact on the Chinese people, in China and abroad, was far-reaching. Jane Larson argues the boycott, "marked the beginning of mass politics and modern nationalism in China. Never before had shared nationalistic aspirations mobilized Chinese across the world in political action, joining the cause of Chinese migrants with the fate of the Chinese nation."

== Historical vs. contemporary perceptions of US military presence in East Asian host countries: South Korea, Japan, and the Philippines ==
Historically, public perceptions of the U.S. military presence in East Asia have been shaped by both security concerns and legacies of colonialism and foreign domination. Following World War II and during the Cold War, the U.S. established a significant military footprint in Japan, South Korea, and the Philippines, positioning itself as a guarantor of regional security against communist expansion. In Japan, many initially accepted the U.S. presence as a necessity in the post-war recovery period, particularly amid Cold War tensions. However, this acceptance was complicated by anti-base sentiments in places like Okinawa, where the disproportionate concentration of U.S. bases bred deep resentment. In the Philippines, the presence of U.S. military bases like Clark Air Base and Subic Bay became symbolic of continued American influence long after independence, sparking nationalist opposition that culminated in the Philippine Senate’s 1991 decision to shut them down. Meanwhile, in South Korea, the perception of the U.S. military shifted from gratitude during the Korean War to a more ambivalent stance as the country democratized and civil society grew more vocal.

In recent years, evolving geopolitical tensions have reshaped public opinion across the region. The rise of China’s People’s Liberation Army and increased aggression from North Korea have contributed to consistently high levels of support for maintaining U.S. military presence in East Asia. Nevertheless, this general support masks a more complex reality: each country also experiences strong domestic opposition to U.S. bases, often rooted in concerns about sovereignty, environmental degradation, and social justice.

In Japan, particularly Okinawa—which hosts about 75% of U.S. military facilities in the country—the Marine Corps Air Station Futenma has been a focal point for activist opposition. Local residents have long protested against noise pollution, environmental damage, and a troubling pattern of crimes including gender-based violence committed by U.S. service members. These concerns have persisted despite national-level support for the security alliance with the U.S.

In the Philippines, skepticism toward the U.S. military has deepened amid fears of becoming entangled in great power competition between the U.S. and China. Filipino activists have criticized the Visiting Forces Agreement, particularly its immunity clause, which allows U.S. military personnel to avoid prosecution under Philippine law. Many see this as an affront to national sovereignty. The return of U.S. troops under Enhanced Defense Cooperation Agreements (EDCA) has coincided with deteriorating human rights conditions under President Bongbong Marcos. Critics argue that increased military presence emboldens the government’s repression of dissent and social movements.

South Korea presents a slightly different picture. While the public largely supports the U.S. presence as a deterrent to North Korea, there are growing frustrations over burden-sharing with 17% of South Koreans believing their country contributes too much financially to the United States Forces Korea. Some also fear that U.S. militarization could escalate inter-Korean tensions. Despite these concerns, anti-base movements have struggled to gain widespread traction in the public consciousness as a disconnect between activist campaigns and mainstream public opinion seems to remain, which continues to favor a strong U.S. military role in the region.

== Students and art collectors ==
During the late 19th-century, Qing China and Imperial Japan sent thousands of students to study in the United States. As part of the Self-Strengthening Movement, the Qing government sent 120 students to New England to live and study for a decade, 1872–1882. However, far more students attended the missionary schools, which had a greater impact on their thinking. Furthermore, for every hundred Chinese students in the United States there were a thousand in Japan, which was closer, cheaper, and the language overlapped Chinese. Chinese students comprised a critical mass, organized themselves and were increasingly committed to a revolution in China. Sun Yat-sen actively recruited them, but Chinese diplomats in Japan tried to support the more conservative students and suppress the revolutionary impulses.

Wealthy Americans first took notice of Chinese art in the late 18th century, and Japanese art a century later. Wealthy merchants used trading voyages to purchase items, and by the 1850s numerous collectors were active.

== Dollar diplomacy fails in China ==
Dollar diplomacy was the policy of the Taft administration (1909–1913). The goal was to minimize the use or threat of military force and instead use American economic power to create a tangible American interest in China that would limit the scope of the other powers, increase the opportunity for American trade and investment, and help maintain the Open Door of trading opportunities of all nations. In his Annual Message to Congress on December 3, 1912, Taft summarized the basic idea:

The diplomacy of the present administration has sought to respond to modern ideas of commercial intercourse. This policy has been characterized as substituting dollars for bullets. It is one that appeals alike to idealistic humanitarian sentiments, to the dictates of sound policy and strategy, and to legitimate commercial aims.

Whereas Theodore Roosevelt wanted to conciliate Japan and help it neutralize Russia, Taft and his Secretary of State Philander Knox ignored Roosevelt's policy and his advice.

Dollar diplomacy was based on the false assumption that American financial interests could mobilize their potential power, and wanted to do so in East Asia. However the American financial system was not geared to handle international finance, such as loans and large investments, and had to depend primarily on London. The British also wanted an open door in China, but were not prepared to support American financial maneuvers. Finally, the other powers held territorial interests, including naval bases and designated geographical areas which they dominated inside China, while the United States refused anything of the kind. Bankers were reluctant, but Taft and Knox kept pushing them to invest. Most efforts were failures, until finally the United States forced its way into the Hukuang international railway loan. The loan was finally made by the so-called China Consortium in 1911, and helped spark a widespread "Railway Protection Movement" revolt against foreign investment that overthrew the Chinese government. The bonds caused no end of disappointment and trouble. As late as 1983, over 300 American investors tried, unsuccessfully, to force the government of China to redeem the worthless Hukuang bonds. When Woodrow Wilson became president in March 1913, he immediately canceled all support for Dollar diplomacy. Historians agree that Taft's Dollar diplomacy was a failure everywhere, In the Far East it alienated Japan and Russia, and created a deep suspicion among the other powers hostile to American motives.

== Immigration ==
East Asian immigration to the United States came in three phases. From 1850 to 1880 about 165,000 Chinese arrived, brought in to build railroads; most returned to China, and because few Chinese women arrived, the numbers of Chinese-Americans shrank, hostility was strong, and were met with numerous violent attacks. As a result, most Chinese-Americans moved to ghettos called Chinatowns in larger cities. the Chinese Exclusion Act of 1882 drastically reduced immigration of unskilled laborers, but students and businessmen were allowed

Large numbers of Japanese farmers went to Hawaii in the 1890s before it became part of the United States. In 1900–10, Japanese farm workers arrived in California and the West Coast. Public opinion in the West was quite hostile to the Chinese and Japanese, and numerous laws were passed that tried to stop or slow the inflow. After 1965 racial quotas were ended, and large numbers of Asians began arriving.

=== Restrictions ===
The main legal restriction was the Chinese Exclusion Act, which largely prohibited the immigration of unskilled Chinese from 1882 to 1943. What did occur was largely illegal, especially claiming falsely to have been born in the United States. About 80 to 90 percent were men who left their wives and families behind in China and never saw them again, but they did send remittances.

Japan was too powerful and prideful a nation after defeated Russia in 1905 to tolerate legal restrictions. However president Theodore Roosevelt did make the Gentlemen's Agreement of 1907 such that the Japanese would not allow unskilled immigration to the United States. In the 1924 law immigration from Asia was almost completely stopped, except for allowing people who had been born in the United States.

=== Postwar immigration ===
World War II-era legislation and judicial rulings gradually increased the ability of Asian Americans to immigrate and become naturalized citizens. By 1960 there were 200,000 Filipino Americans; they numbered 2 million by 2000. The Communist takeovers in East Asia led to waves of refugees from conflicts occurring in Southeast Asia such as the Vietnam War. Korean Americans came as war brides and orphans and many other roles, totaling about 800,000 by 1990. Asian American immigrants have a significant percentage of well-educated individuals who have already achieved professional status, a first among immigration groups.

The most important factor was the Immigration and Nationality Act Amendments of 1965 which ended the main restrictions and quotas on Asians. The total grew by a multiple of 26 from 491,000 in 1960 to 12.8 million in 2014. Asian Americans were the fastest-growing racial group between 2000 and 2010. By 2012, more immigrants came from Asia than from Latin America. In 2015, Pew Research Center found that from 2010 to 2015 more immigrants came from Asia than from Latin America, and that since 1965 Asians have made up a quarter of all immigrants.

Continental Asians have made up an increasing proportion of the foreign-born Americans: "In 1960, Asians represented 5 percent of the U.S. foreign-born population; by 2014, their share grew to 30 percent of the nation's 42.4 million immigrants." As of 2016, "Continental Asia is the second-largest region of birth (after Latin America) of U.S. immigrants." In 2013, China surpassed Mexico as the top single country of origin for immigrants to the U.S. Asian immigrants "are more likely than the overall foreign-born population to be naturalized citizens"; in 2014, 59% of Asian immigrants had U.S. citizenship, compared to 47% of all immigrants. Postwar Asian immigration to the U.S. has been diverse: in 2014, 31% of Continental Asian immigrants to the U.S. were from East Asia (predominately China and Korea); 27.7% were from South Asia (predominately India); 32.6% were from Southeast Asia (predominately the Philippines and Vietnam) and 8.3% were from Western Asia.

Increasing amounts Asian American students demanded university-level research and teaching into Asian history and the interaction with the United States. The Asian-American community supported multiculturalism but opposed affirmative action that amounted to an Asian quota on their admission.

== Cultural transmission ==
=== Cuisine ===
East Asian immigrants to the United States brought along their distinctive culinary traditions. Chinese and Japanese cuisines, for example, have become widely popular across the United States. There are also several different regional Chinese culinary traditions that have become popular, such as Szechwan, Hunan, Fukien, and Yunnan. The preparation and presentation of rice, fish, and fresh produce prioritized in the typical Chinese dietary habit is emphasized. In return American fast food restaurants have become popular across East Asia. The famed American hamburger chain McDonald's opened its first outlet in Japan in 1971, Hong Kong in 1975, Taiwan in 1984, South Korea in 1988, and China in 1990. Typically, American fast food corporations operating in East Asia own at least 50 percent of each franchise while the local entrepreneurs and investors control the remainder.

=== Sports ===
Baseball spread through East Asia in the late 19th century due to American influence, becoming one of the most popular sports in the region. Japan also helped to spread the game, as Korea and Taiwan sought to prove themselves on the diamond against their Japanese rulers during the colonial era, and modern professional Japanese baseball leagues have fostered the growth of the sport throughout the region. Since the 2010s, the sport has also grown tremendously in China.

== See also ==
- Journal of American-East Asian Relations, an academic scholarly journal focused on the comprehensive investigation and inquiry of East Asian-United States relations.
- Northeast Asia

=== China ===
- China containment policy
- China Lobby
- Chinese Americans
- Chinese Century
- Chinese espionage in the United States
- China–United States trade war
- U.S.–China Strategic and Economic Dialogue

=== United States ===
- Foreign relations of the United States
  - China–United States relations
  - Hong Kong–United States relations
  - Macau–United States relations
  - Japan–United States relations
  - North Korea–United States relations
  - South Korea–United States relations
  - Mongolia–United States relations
  - Taiwan–United States relations
- History of Asian Americans, a chronology and guide to articles
- East Asian Americans
  - Asian American immigration history
  - Asian American political history
  - Chinese American history
  - Hong Kong American history
  - Japanese American history
  - Korean American history
  - Mongolian American history
  - Taiwanese American history
