= Ernest R. May =

American historian (1928–2009)

Dean of Harvard College
- In office 1969–1971
- Preceded by: Fred Glimp
- Succeeded by: Charles Preston Whitlock

Personal details
- Born: November 19, 1928 Fort Worth, Texas, U.S.
- Died: June 1, 2009 (aged 80) Cambridge, Massachusetts, U.S.
- Education: University of California, Los Angeles

Academic work
- Discipline: Modern American history
- Institutions: Harvard University

Ernest Richard May (November 19, 1928 – June 1, 2009) was an American historian of international relations, whose 14 published books include analyses of American involvement in World War I and the causes of the Fall of France during World War II. His 1997 book The Kennedy Tapes: Inside the White House During the Cuban Missile Crisis became the primary sources of the 2000 film Thirteen Days starring Kevin Costner that viewed the Missile Crisis from the perspective of American political leaders. He served on the 9/11 commission and highlighted the failures of the government intelligence agencies. May taught full-time on the faculty of Harvard University for 55 years, until his death. May was also a recipient of the 1988 University of Louisville Grawemeyer Award for Thinking in Time: The Uses of History for Decision Makers, co-authored with Richard Neustadt.

== Scholarship ==
May's PhD dissertation at UCLA in 1951 was on the role of William Jennings Bryan as secretary of state in 1914–1915. It was never published. It was directed by John W. Caughey.

=== Harvard University ===
He joined the Harvard University faculty following the completion of his military service in 1954, and remained there full-time until his death. May was promoted to associate professor of history in 1959 and full professor in 1963. He served as the dean of Harvard College for two years starting in 1969, and served as chairman of the Harvard history department from 1976 to 1979. At the John F. Kennedy School of Government, May also served on the faculty. May and historian Richard Neustadt created a course that had students make choices for current political issues based on a thorough review of choices made over the course of history. Their work together became the basis for the 1986 book Thinking in Time: The Uses of History for Decision-Makers, published by the Free Press that has been widely used by students and professionals in the field.

=== Books and essays ===
His first book, The World War and American Isolation 1914-17, published in 1959, was based in part on German government documents and available on microfilm. The book was honored by the American Historical Association with its George Louis Beer Prize, which recognizes the best work each year published on European international history. The book was included on a list of 1,780 books chosen to be included in the White House library.

Together with historian Philip D. Zelikow, May edited the 1997 book The Kennedy Tapes: Inside the White House During the Cuban Missile Crisis, published by Harvard University Press. The book provided details based on taped recordings of conversations made in 1962 by President John F. Kennedy as he considered options to deal with the Cuban Missile Crisis that included unilateral air strikes to destroy the Soviet missiles based in Cuba or the imposition of naval quarantine around the island to prevent further deliveries of new missiles and materials. The book offered a word-for-word transcription by May and Zelikow of the secret White House recordings made during the crisis. The book was used as the source for the 2000 film Thirteen Days with Kevin Costner as presidential advisor Kenneth O'Donnell and Bruce Greenwood as President Kennedy.

Strange Victory: Hitler's Conquest of France, published by Hill and Wang in 2000, tells the chain of events that led to the rapid fall of the French Army in the Battle of France. The book counters the perception that the Armistice of 22 June 1940 was inevitable, and recounts the chain of events on the political and military fronts that led to the collapse. Reviewer David Stafford of the New York Times records how May documents that French military had more and better-trained troops than the Germans and had more tanks, bombers and fighters. The French general staff was competent and confident, while their German counterparts were cautious and leery of success. The fall began with intelligence failures by the French that led them to misjudge German plans such as their sweep through the Ardennes around the Maginot Line.

May's specialty of studying the effects of intelligence failures led to his role as a senior advisor on the 9/11 Commission, in which he played a role in the preparation of the 604-page report it issued documenting the attacks and offering recommendations for the future.

His final essay addressed the China's peaceful rise as a major world power, a situation that was a major foreign policy turning point for the United States but May believed that war between the two was not inevitable as the decision by the Chinese government to focus on economic growth would allow it to remain at peace with its trading partners.

== Personal life ==
May was born on November 19, 1928, in Fort Worth, Texas, and grew up as an only child. He graduated from R. L. Paschal High School in 1944. He attended the University of California, Los Angeles, and was awarded a bachelor's degree in 1948 and received his Ph.D. in 1951. After his graduation, he served during the Korean War era from 1951 to 1954 as an officer in the United States Navy Reserves.

A resident of Cambridge, Massachusetts, May died at age 80 on June 1, 2009, at Beth Israel Deaconess Medical Center in Boston, due to complications resulting from cancer surgery. He was survived by Susan Wood, his second wife. Nancy Caughey, his first wife, had died in 2000, and May was survived by their son and two daughters, as well as three grandchildren. May's daughter Rachel has been a member of the New York State Senate since 2019.

== Works ==
- "The United States, the Soviet Union, and the Far Eastern War, 1941–1945," Pacific Historical Review 24:2 (1955): 153–174. https://doi.org/10.2307/3634575
- "The Development of Political-Military Consultation in the United States." Political Science Quarterly 78#2 1955, pp. 161–180, https://doi.org/10.2307/2145220.
- "The Far Eastern Policy of the United States in the Period of the Russo-Japanese War: A Russian View," American Historical Review 62:2 (1957): 345–351. https://doi.org/10.2307/1845187
- The World War and American Isolation: 1914–1917 (1959) online
- Imperial Democracy: The Emergence of America as a Great Power (1961) online
- American Imperialism: A Speculative Essay (1968) online
- American-East Asian Relations: A Survey (Harvard UP, 1972) online, coeditor
- The making of the Monroe doctrine (Harvard UP, 1975)
- History of the Strategic Arms Competition (Office of the Secretary of Defense Historical Office, 1981) Part I online Part II online
- Thinking in Time: The Uses of History for Decision-Makers, (1986)
- The Kennedy Tapes: Inside the White House during the Cuban Missile Crisis (1997) online
- Strange Victory: Hitler's Conquest of France (2000) online
