= Times Square takeover =

Demonstration in Times Square

Time Square Takeover
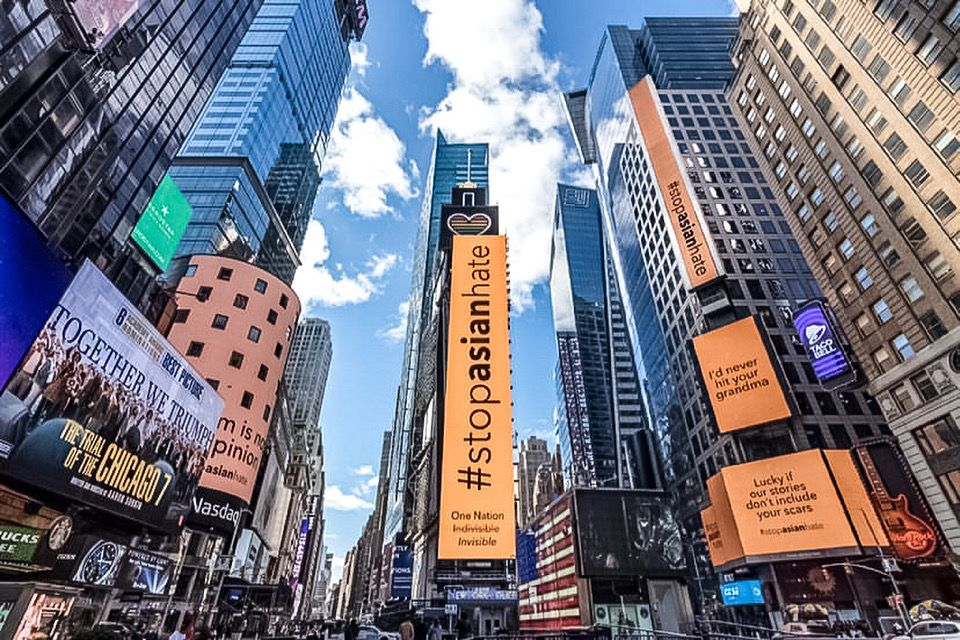
- Date: April 4, 2021
- Venue: Times Square, NYC
- Theme: Racism in the United States
- Cause: Rise in hate crimes against Asian-Americans
- Organized by: Freedom March, Jack Liang, Oliver Pras

The Times Square Take Over was an anti-racism demonstration held in Times Square, New York City, on April 4, 2021.

The demonstration was a follow-up event to the rally against hate, which took place two weeks earlier.

Its purpose was to heighten repudiation to the spike in hate crimes against Asian-Americans during the COVID-19 pandemic, and it was one of many other demonstrations held across the US that Sunday, in a show of solidarity with the AAPI community.

== Background ==
Only one week after the Rally Against Hate, a 65-year-old Filipino woman was pummelled in a building's lobby, in Yonkers, by a man who kept calling her an "Asian bitch" as he beat her, while security guards watched from inside.

Most of the anti-Asian attacks documented over the past year had taken place inside stores or on public streets, and video footage had shown that bystanders rarely intervened. Instead, they remained frozen in place, appearing paralyzed by the violence they were witnessing.

In New York – the city with the highest number of Asian-Americans in the country – more attacks on Asians were recorded during the first quarter of 2021 than during any full year in recent memory. Other cities with large Asian populations also saw double- and triple-digit percentage increases in anti-Asian hate crimes during the same quarter.

A total of 10,905 hate incidents targeting Asian-Americans were reported between March 2020 and December 2021, according to research released by Stop AAPI Hate. The majority of incidents concerned women, and 1 out of 6 involved physical assault.

== Participation ==
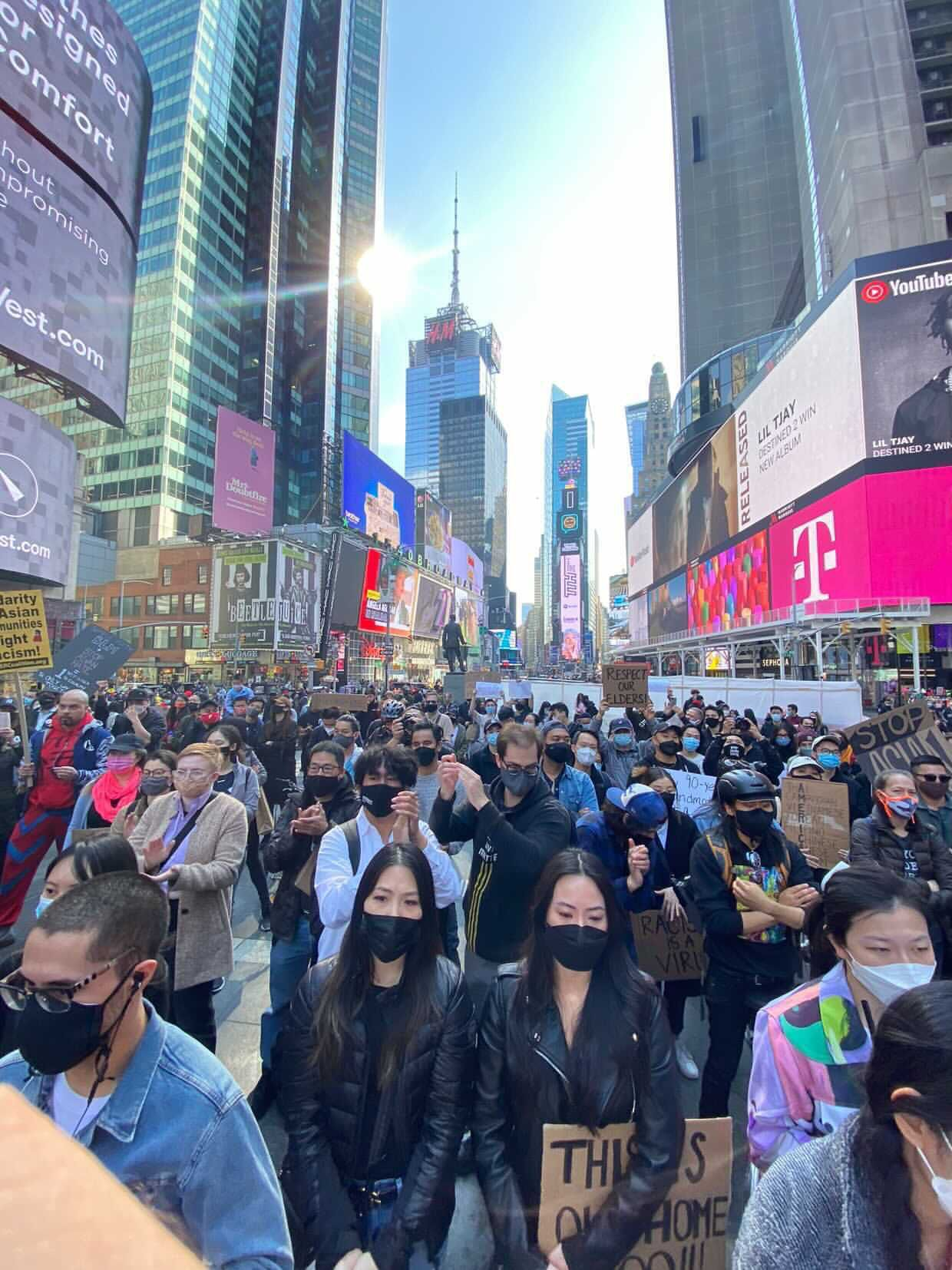
Hundreds of people attended the demonstration

Hundreds of Asian-Americans gathered in Times Square for this Stop Asian Hate demonstration, and then marched to City Hall Park and across the Brooklyn Bridge before ending at Cadman Plaza, where an even larger show of support took place.

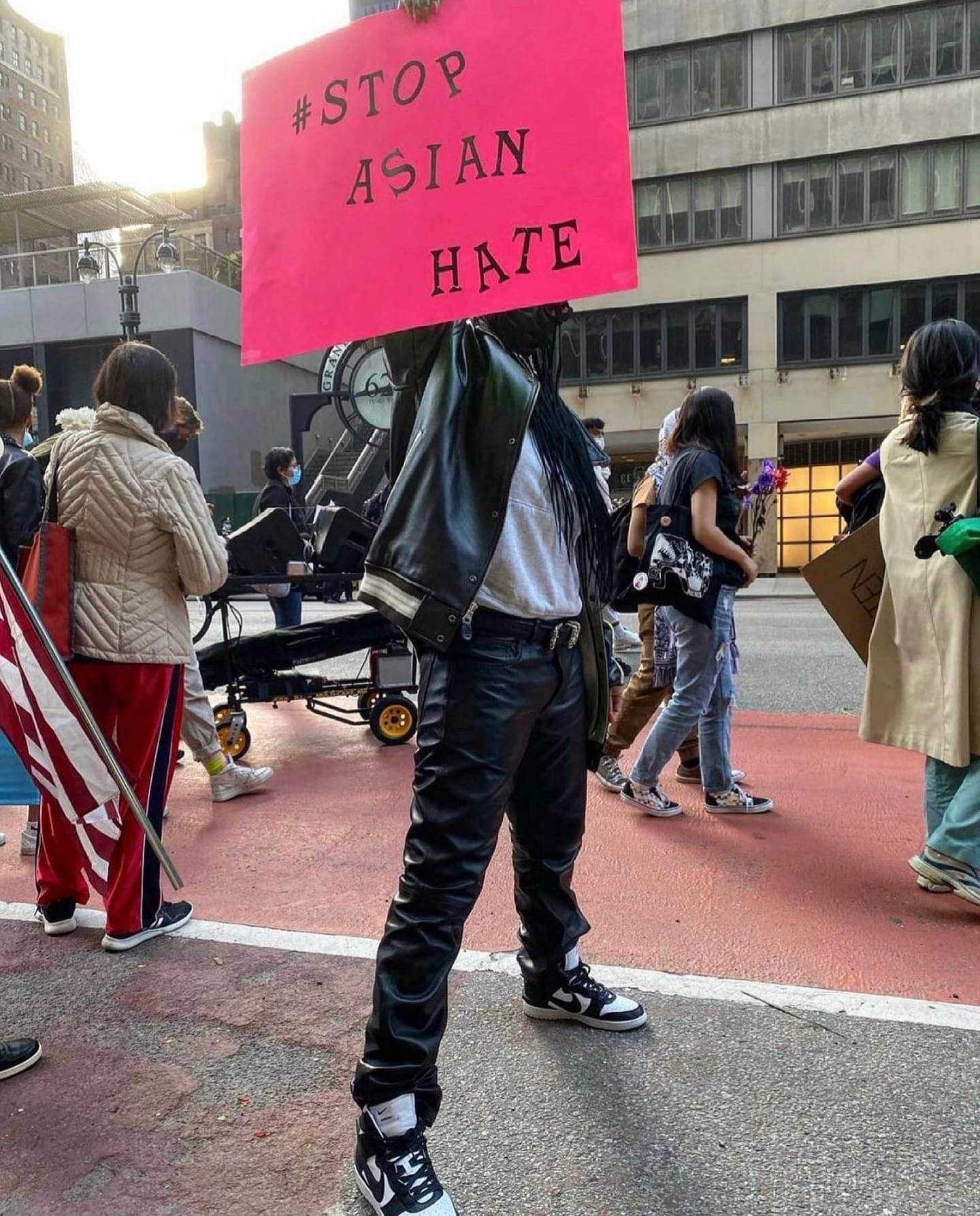
A demonstrator holding a Stop Asian Hate sign

The crowd carried signs that read "Protect Asian Women," "Stop Killing Us," and "Bad Asian Bitches Say No More," alluding to the attack on the Filipino woman that had occurred a few days earlier. Some demonstrators also marched to the building in Yonkers where she was attacked.

Joining the protest was pop star Rihanna, who attended incognito and helped writing protest signs.

The take over was organized by anti-racism activists Jack Liang, and Oliver Pras in collaboration with the activist group Freedom March.

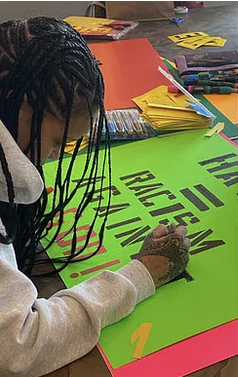
Rihanna writing an anti-racism sign

== Responses ==
New York City Police Commissioner Dermot Shea announced a new initiative to combat the anti-Asian violence, with plans to deploy teams of undercover officers of Asian descent "to prevent New Yorkers from becoming victims in the first place."

Holding these events has raised awareness among the American people about the seriousness of the current state of racism in their country, and has brought the Stop Asian Hate and Black Lives Matter movements closer together.
