= Rally against hate =

2021 anti-racism demonstration in New York

Rally Against Hate
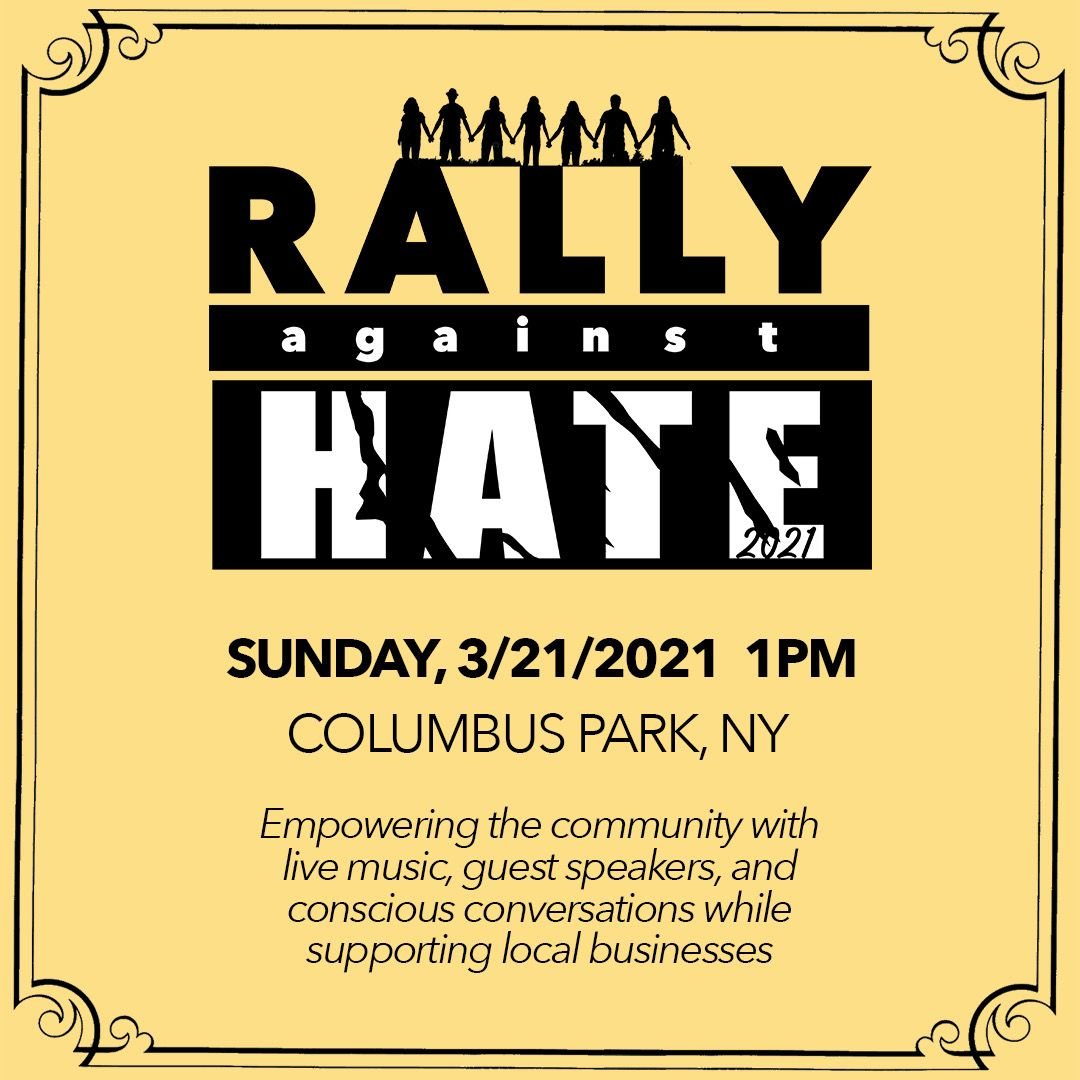
- Flyer of the Rally Against Hate
- Date: March 21, 2021
- Location: Columbus Park, NY
- Theme: Racism in the United States
- Cause: Rise in hate crimes against Asian-Americans
- Organized by: Jack Liang, Oliver Pras
- Participants: Chuck Schumer, John Liu, Yuhline Niou, Andrew Yang, MC Jin

The Rally Against Hate was a large anti-racism demonstration that took place in Columbus Park, New York, on March 21, 2021.

Motivated by the recent increase of hate crimes against their community in the US, the rally was to repudiate racism towards Asian-Americans, but it was also attended by numerous members of the African-American community, sharing a common purpose in opposition to white supremacy.

== Background ==
The rally was directly motivated by a multiple crime that occurred five days earlier in Atlanta, where a gunman opened fire in three massage spas, killing eight women, six of them of Asian descent — a massacre known as the Atlanta Spa Shootings.

In February 2021, a 52-year-old Asian American woman was attacked outside a New York City bakery. The incident left her with at least half a dozen stitches on her head.

A few days later, a knife-wielding attacker randomly stabbed an Asian man in the back near a downtown Manhattan federal courthouse.

In November of that same year, 62-year-old Guiying Ma had her head smashed with a rock while sweeping in front of her Queens home. She died from her injuries three months later.

In January 2022, 40-year-old Michelle Go was pushed to her death from the subway platform into an oncoming train.

In February, 35-year-old Christina Lee was stabbed to death when a homeless man followed her into her apartment. A makeshift memorial outside her residence was later vandalized.

The day of the rally was itself marked by violence. Not long before the demonstration began, an Asian woman walking to the event with her young daughter was assaulted by a man in Astor Place, who demanded the victim's protest sign, stomped on it, and punched her twice in the face.

The Asian American Federation estimated approximately 500 reports of bias incidents and hate crimes directed at their community in New York City in 2021, and according to Stop AAPI Hate there were more than 3,800 reported attacks against Asian-Americans nationwide that year. Between March 2020 and July 2022, there were a total of 11,500 reports of anti-Asian bias incidents in the US. This figures equal to a 1,900% increase in anti-Asian hate crimes in only two years.

Many have linked this increase in violence against Asian-Americans to the COVID-19 pandemic, as it would have originated in China. In fact, an Anti-Defamation League report indicated that the distribution of white supremacist propaganda nearly doubled during the pandemic, and studies have shown a direct correlation between the xenophobic language deployed by former President Donald Trump during the early days of the pandemic and the rise in racism against Asians. However, New York's Asian community claims that they've faced harsh racism for generations.

This situation led to the strengthening of the Stop Asian Hate movement, which seeks to raise awareness about the racism, discrimination, and racial inequality experienced by Asian-Americans.

== Participation ==
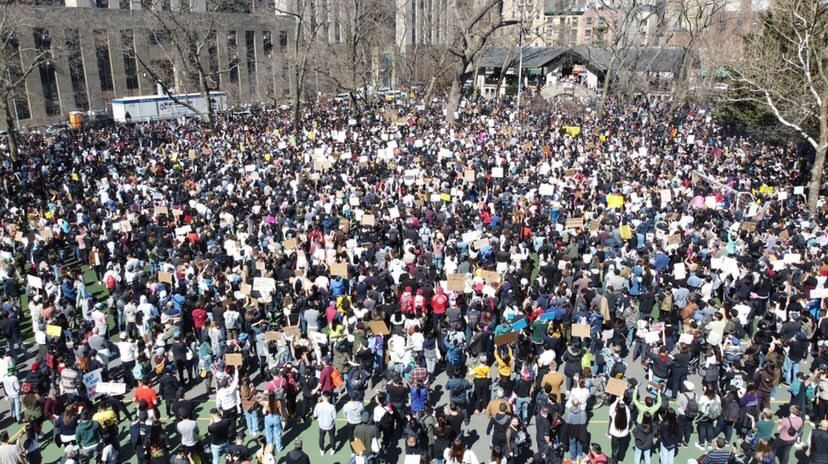
Over 10,000 people attended the rally

An estimated total of ten thousand demonstrators crowded in and around Columbus Park, in Manhattan's Chinatown, from 11 AM to 5 PM that Sunday, being the largest demonstration ever held by Asian-Americans in US history to that day.

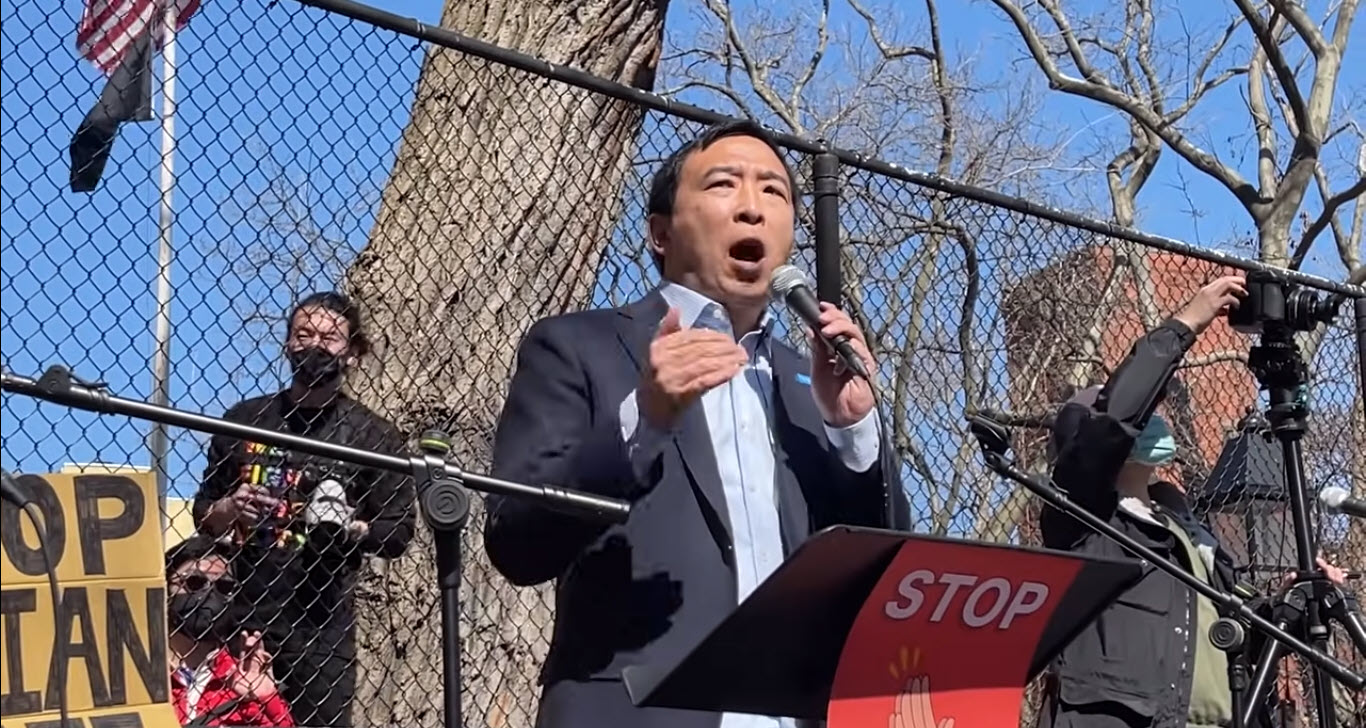
Andrew Yang gave an emotional speech

The rally was organized by anti-racism activist Jack Liang, and attended by prominent figures, such as Senate Majority Leader Chuck Schumer, Senator John Liu, Assembly Member Yuh-Line Niou, entrepreneur and ex presidential primary candidate Andrew Yang, and rapper MC Jin.

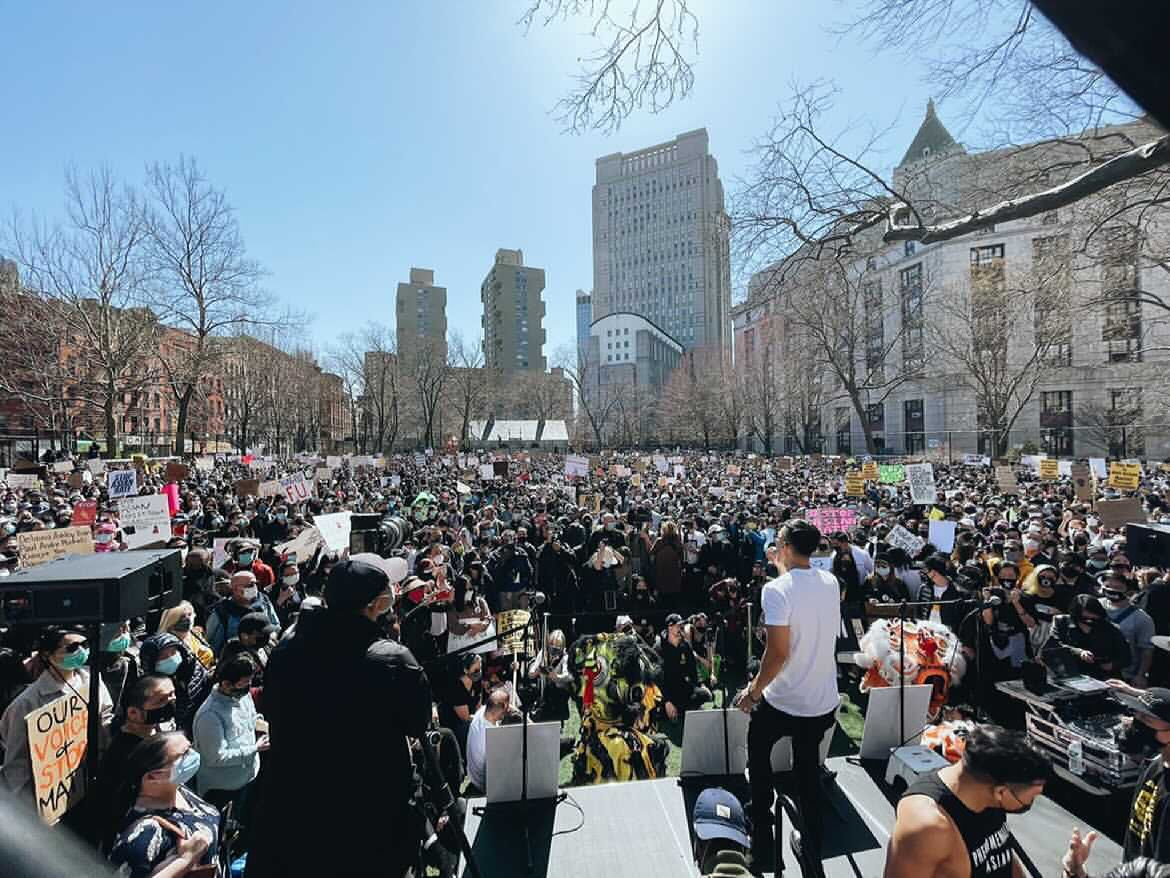
Jack Liang addressing the crowd

In an electrifying speech, Andrew Yang addressed the Atlanta Spa Shootings asking the crowd "Are we going to make these women's lives and passings mean something to our families, our community and the country?!" He also quoted Martin Luther King saying "We need to help humanize an economy that is turning on more and more people," and called on the New York community as a whole to get involved and take decisive action against any display of racism.

== Responses ==
Many other similar events have been held across the US since the rally took place, and as a direct consequence of their impact on public opinion, the NY state budget allocated for the AAPI community was risen from US$300K in 2021 to US$20 million in 2022.

In addition, Stop Asian Hate has joined forces with Black Lives Matter to empower themselves together in their fight against racism in the United States.
