= Killing of Bert Atienza =

2026 crime in Virginia, United States

- Bert Atienza
- Born: December 3, 1948; Malabon, Philippines
- Died: June 8, 2026 (aged 77); Virginia, U.S.
- Cause of death: Blunt head trauma
- Resting place: Colonial Grove Memorial Park
- Spouse: Josephine
- Children: 1

Bert Atienza (December 3, 1948 – June 8, 2026) was an American military veteran and retired retail worker who died following an assault at a Walmart store in Virginia. Born in the Philippines, he served in the United States military, then worked at Home Depot, and lived in Virginia Beach, Virginia. While shopping at Walmart, after having a conversation with a Walmart employee who had almost struck his wife with a cart, Atienza was assaulted by the Walmart employee's parent and another adult; Atienza died from injuries sustained during the assault.

Atienza had a wife and a son. The parent, the other adult, and the Walmart employee were arrested, and charged for crimes related to the death of Atienza.

== Background ==
Bert was born in 1948, in Malabon. Josephine met Bert while both were in the Philippines. Bert served in the United States military. Bert later worked for Home Depot for two decades. They were married for 42 years, and had a son. They both resided in Virginia Beach, Virginia.

== Confrontation ==
Bert and Josephine Atienza were shopping for groceries at a Walmart store in Norfolk, Virginia, on June 7, 2026, after attending church. A 17-year-old Walmart employee allegedly nearly struck Josephine with a cart and did not apologize. Bert attempted to get the Walmart employee to apologize for nearly hitting Josephine, but was not successful in the endeavor. After the conversation, the employee allegedly threw a can at them (missing both of the Atienzas) as the Atienzas walked away. During the conversation, the 17-year-old Walmart employee was allegedly on the phone with a parent.

== Killing ==
While the Atienzas continued to shop at Walmart, a few minutes later Erika Mitchell and Travis White arrived at the Walmart and allegedly confronted them. (Note: The 17-year-old Walmart employee is the daughter of either Mitchell or White. Mitchell and White are both residents of Norfolk.) The 17-year-old Walmart employee allegedly pointed out to Mitchell and White who Bert was. It is alleged that Bert was shoved from behind, and grabbed. One of them allegedly struck Bert in the face, which caused him to fall onto the floor. While on the floor, Bert was kicked allegedly by Mitchell and White. (Note: The event was captured on the store's video surveillance system.)

After Bert was allegedly attacked, Josephine held Bert in her lap where he lost consciousness. Atienza was unconscious when law enforcement arrived after being notified of an alleged assault, and he was taken to an area hospital. Atienza died the next day after being attacked at a hospital, on June 8.

== Criminal investigation ==
Mitchell, White, and a 17-year-old were arrested. Mitchell, and White, were charged with aggravated malicious wounding, conspiracy to commit a felony, and malicious wounding by a mob. The 17-year-old was charged with aggravated malicious wounding, assault and battery, and conspiracy to commit a felony. They were held without bond. The charges of Mitchell and White were eventually elevated to second degree murder; the charges of the 17-year-old Walmart employee was altered to involuntary manslaughter. (Note: Walmart later stated that the 17-year-old was no longer employed by them.)

The defense attorney of Mitchell, and White, has received threats from individuals not involved in the case. The case goes before a grand jury on October 7.

== See also ==
- Killing of Michelle Go
- Killing of Vicha Ratanapakdee
- Killing of Yao Pan Ma
- Filipino Americans in Hampton Roads
