= Killing of Vicha Ratanapakdee =

Killing of elderly Thai man in San Francisco, United States

- Vicha Ratanapakdee
- Location: Anza Vista, San Francisco, California, U.S.
- Date: January 28, 2021; 5 years ago 8:28 a.m.
- Attack type: Manslaughter
- Victims: Vicha Ratanapakdee, aged 84
- Perpetrator: Antoine Watson
- Motive: Rage; Possibly racism against Asian Americans
- Verdict: Not guilty of first-degree murder, second-degree murder, and elder abuse; Guilty of involuntary manslaughter and aggravated assault
- Sentence: 8-year suspended sentence; 5 years in county jail already served; 3 years probation following release from jail

Vicha Ratanapakdee (Thai: วิชา รัตนภักดี, RTGS: Wicha Rattanaphakdi; December 5, 1936 – January 30, 2021) was an 84-year-old Thai man who was killed as a result of being forcefully pushed to the ground in a daylight attack in San Francisco, California, United States by an African-American male. His death became a lightning rod for the Stop Asian Hate movement.

== Killing ==
At approximately 8 a.m. on January 28, Vicha left his daughter's apartment in the Anza Vista neighborhood of San Francisco, where he had been supervising his grandsons, to go on a walk while the children were attending Zoom online classes. He was walking around Fortuna Avenue when 19-year-old Antoine Watson, an African-American male, ran across the street and violently shoved him to the ground. Vicha's head hit the pavement as he fell. He never regained consciousness and died two days after arrival in the hospital from a brain hemorrhage. The killing was captured on a CCTV camera across the street.

== Suspects and trial ==
Two days after the assault, Antoine Watson was arrested and charged with assault with a deadly weapon, elder abuse and murder. Watson was identified through additional surveillance footage, matching clothes, and the license plate of his BMW, which was on record as he had been stopped hours before the assault at around 2 a.m. for reckless driving and speeding after running two stop signs on Cole Street at Parnassus Avenue and crashing into a parked car. Shortly before the attack, a surveillance camera captured Watson parking his car in Anza Vista and punching a different parked vehicle before running off-screen. Both cameras showed Watson returning to the car to retrieve his cell phone and walking back to Fortuna Avenue, where he took pictures of Vicha's unconscious body before leaving for the parking lot again and driving away. Public defender Anita Nabha said that the traffic check caused Watson "a lot of distress on that day,” and that he has “undergone a lot of trauma in his life.”

Watson remained in custody since his arrest and pled not guilty. On January 15, 2026, Watson was found guilty of involuntary manslaughter, but not guilty of murder. He was also found guilty of assault, but not guilty of elder abuse.

Arrested alongside Watson was his girlfriend, 20-year-old Maylasia Goo (often misspelled as Malaysia Goo), as an accessory after the fact. Watson and Goo were residents of Daly City, California, where they were apprehended at the apartment of Watson's family after a warrant was issued. Goo was a passenger in Watson's car during both the traffic stop and the assault.

On January 16, 2026, Watson was convicted of involuntary manslaughter and assault, after five years in custody awaiting trial. On March 26, 2026, Watson was sentenced to eight years in prison, but the sentence was suspended and he was released on probation for the remainder of his term. The suspension was required under California’s 2-for-1 pretrial credit rule, which counted Watson's five years of pre-trial detention as ten years of credit toward his sentence.

== Victim background ==
Vicha was born on December 5, 1936 in Songkhla province, southern Thailand (then known as Siam) as one of eight siblings to a devout Buddhist family. He grew up on the family-owned orchard and rice paddies, helping on the fields as a farmhand. Vicha attended Sathing Phra Witthaya School before being sent to Bangkok by his parents to study. During this time, Vicha taught himself English and graduated from the prestigious Thammasat University. He worked as a math teacher at a Catholic all-boys school for two years, but starting in 1961, he was employed as an auditor at Kasikornbank's head office in Rat Burana district. Vicha married Jintana Sirichote (Thai: จินตนา ศิริโชติ) on February 6, 1970 outside Hat Yai and had two children with her. After retiring in 1996, the couple lived primarily with their youngest daughter in Songkhla province and sometimes with extended family in Surat Thani province. Since 2000, they also went on regular flights to visit their eldest daughter Monthanus Ratanapakdee (Thai: มณฑนัศ รัตนภักดี; reported by some news outlets by the alias Kim Lawson) in San Francisco, first to support her while she attended business school at UC Berkeley and last in 2018 to help Monthanus and her husband in raising their children, in spite of his worsening near-blindness. He had intended to make his return trip in 2020, but the ongoing COVID-19 pandemic had prevented him from doing such; at the time of his death, he had been cleared to travel back to Thailand within the next few months. Due to having undergone heart surgery in March 2020, Vicha was advised to regularly exercise for recovery, due which he made a habit of walking around the neighborhood.

== Responses ==
Vicha's family has expressed the belief that the death was motivated by racism. His death took place in the context of what some describe as a broader wave of racially motivated attacks and violences on Asian Americans in the Bay Area and other parts of the nation. News coverage as a result of this case and several others discussed rising tensions between African Americans and Asian Americans, and some cautioned against using the crime as an example to further anti-Black racism.

The Thai Ministry of Foreign Affairs issued a warning to all Thais living in the United States to be alert against racially motivated hate crimes.

San Francisco District Attorney Chesa Boudin called the crime "heinous" but thought, according to the evidence, that the attack was not racially motivated, stating that "the defendant was in some sort of a temper tantrum." The family of Ratanapakdee expressed outrage over the characterization of the attack as a "temper tantrum", finding the comments to be disheartening and inappropriate for the severity of the crime. Boudin later clarified his comments, stating that he was referring to the perpetrator's conduct before the crime. According to the family, Boudin had planned to participate in a vigil for Ratanapakdee, but did not show up after the family told him they were not interested in taking pictures or videos with him.

Catherine Stefani, a member of the San Francisco Board of Supervisors, proposed renaming Sonora Lane in Anza Vista after Ratanapakdee. The resolution is supported by the Southeast Asian Development Center and Ratanapakdee's family. On September 30, 2022, it was announced that the street would be renamed “Vicha Ratanapakdee Way”, and would be officialized the next day. Announced speakers were his daughter, Monthanus Ratanapakdee, actor Daniel Dae Kim, and activist Amanda Nguyen.

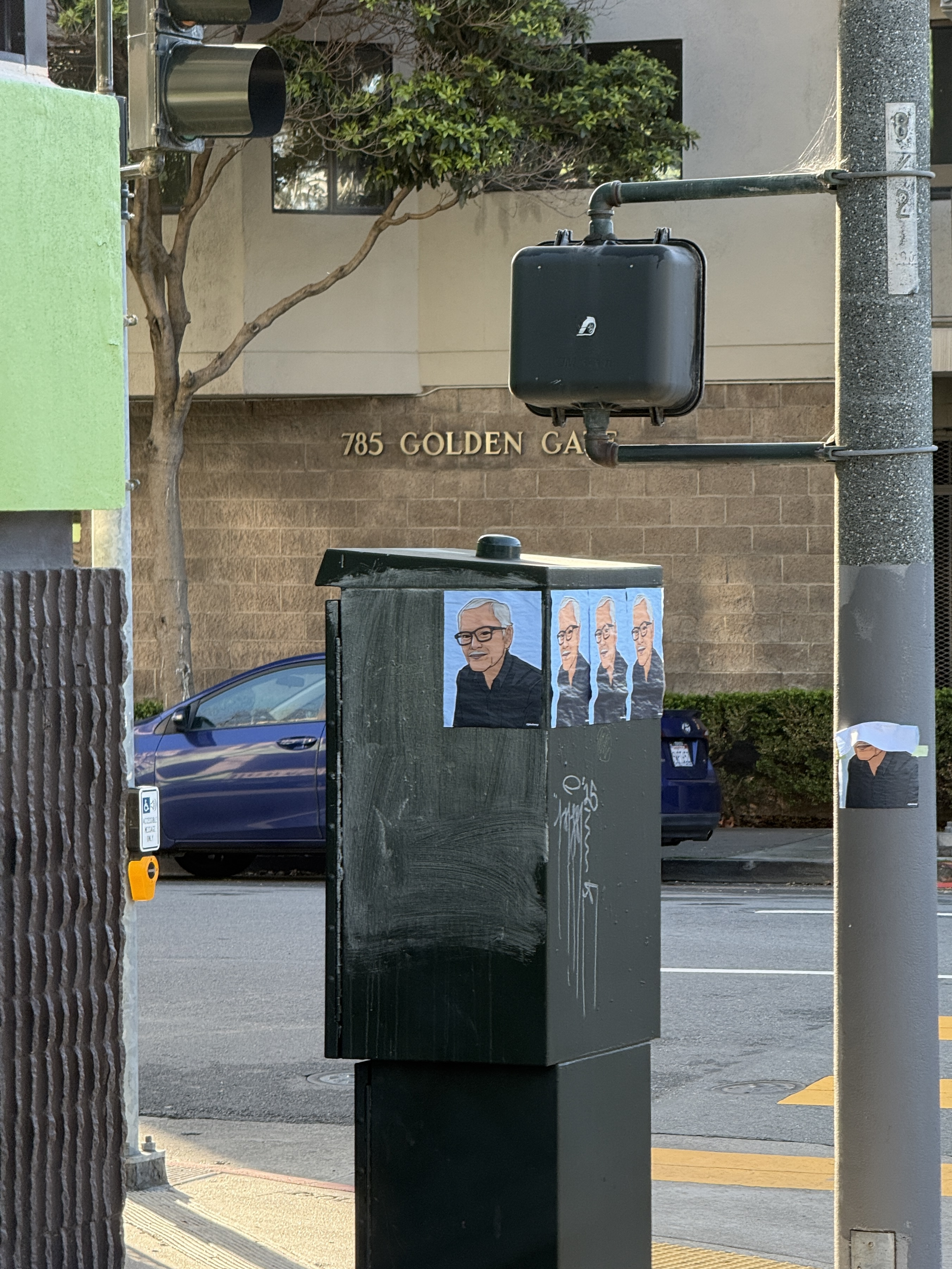
Street Art depicting Vicha Ratanapakdee. San Francisco, California (2026)

After a memorial service at Woodlawn Memorial Park in Colma, California on February 9, Vicha's remains were cremated. One part of his ashes were poured out to sea under the Golden Gate Bridge while the remainder was brought back to Thailand to be given burial processions at a wat in his home village and then interred in a stupa that houses the remains of his six deceased siblings.

== See also ==
=== Responses ===
- Stop AAPI Hate – non-profit formed in response to racist attacks on the AAPI community as a result of the COVID-19 pandemic
- Stop Asian Hate – demonstrations, protests, and rallies against violence targeting Asians in the United States

=== Deaths ===
- Killing of Vincent Chin – killing of a Chinese-American man in Michigan
- Murder of Ee Lee – killing of a Hmong-American woman in Wisconsin
- Murder of Mohammad Anwar – murder of a Pakistani-American man in Washington D.C.
- Killing of Yao Pan Ma – attack on a Chinese-American man in New York City, which resulted in his death a few months later
- Killing of Michelle Go – Chinese-American woman pushed into the path of an oncoming subway train in New York City, which caused her death
- Killing of Christina Yuna Lee – Korean-American woman stabbed to death inside her apartment in New York City
