= Center for Pan Asian Community Services, Inc. =

Human services organization in Georgia, US

Center for Pan Asian Community Services
- Founded: 1980
- Type: Nonprofit organization
- Purpose: Human services, healthcare services, education, research, advocacy
- Headquarters: Chamblee, Georgia, United States of America
- Coordinates: 33°53′29″N 84°17′13″W
- Region served: Metropolitan Atlanta
- Interim CEO: Alexis Nkusi
- Website: www.cpacs.org

The Center for Pan Asian Community Services, Inc. (CPACS) is 501(c)(3), private company, nonprofit human services organization in metropolitan Atlanta, headquartered in northern DeKalb County, Georgia, United States of America. The organization was founded in 1980 and provides broad services for American citizens and non-citizens of all race, ethnicity, and national origin. The organization's primary services include community health, social services, housing, senior services, translation and interpretation, transportation services, education and enrichment programs for children, youth, and families, community education, legal and immigration assistance, counseling, advocacy, and research. CPACS's core objective is to help immigrants and refugees achieve the American Dream. The center operates the CPACS Cosmo Health Center, a Federally Qualified Health Center (FQHC) that serves populations with limited access to health care. Since 2005, the organization has held the Tea Walk, a two-mile empowerment walk along the Buford Highway Corridor to celebrate community diversity and promote civic engagement. CPACS is a member of the Association of Asian Pacific Community Health Organizations (AAPCHO), which is part of the National Council of Asian Pacific Americans. CPACS is one of the first and largest Asian American and Pacific Islander human services agencies in the Southeastern United States.

== History ==
The Center for Pan Asian Community Services was founded in 1980 and began as a volunteer-run organization providing health and human services to Korean Americans in the metropolitan Atlanta counties of DeKalb, Fulton, and Gwinnett. The organization steadily grew with the Asian American population increase following the 1996 Summer Olympics in Atlanta and was able to expand its services. Into the 21st century, the Center for Pan Asian Community Services has approximately 100 staff and serves over 30,000 people of all ethnic and racial groups annually.
