= National Asian Pacific American Women's Forum =

Non-profit organization for Asian and Pacific Islander American women

- Formation: 1996; 30 years ago
- Type: 501(c)(3) organization
- Tax ID no.: 36-4799986
- Purpose: Asian Pacific American community
- Headquarters: Chicago, Illinois
- Website: www.napawf.org

National Asian Pacific American Women's Forum (also known as NAPAWF) is a community-based non-profit organization based in Chicago and founded in 1996. They have offices in Atlanta and Washington, DC, as well as 15 chapters across the country. It is an organization that focuses on empowering AAPI women and girls to participate in critical decisions that affect their lives, families, and communities. NAPAWF uses a reproductive justice framework to motivate and push AAPI women to be involved in driving systemic change and policy in the United States.

== History ==
The idea for the National Asian Pacific American Women's Forum started at the 1995 United Nations Fourth World Conference on Women in Beijing by Asian and Pacific Islander American female activists who met at the non-governmental organization (NGO) forums. A year later, in September 1996, 157 women became the founding sisters of NAPAWF at a gathering in Los Angeles.

The founding sisters identified six issue areas to serve as the platform and foundation for NAPAWF's work:

1. Civil Rights
2. Economic Justice
3. Educational Access
4. Ending Violence Against Women
5. Health
6. Immigrant and Refugee Rights

The organization's historical records are kept as part of the Sophia Smith Collection at Smith College in Massachusetts since 2008.
