= Killing of Yao Pan Ma =

2021 beating death in New York City

- Undated photo of Ma
- Location: East Harlem, New York City, U.S.
- Date: Attack: April 23, 2021; 5 years ago Ma's Death: December 31, 2021
- Attack type: Murder by beating, hate crime
- Victims: Yao Pan Ma, aged 61
- Perpetrator: Jarrod Powell
- Motive: Anti-Asian racism
- Verdict: Pleaded guilty
- Convictions: Manslaughter as a hate crime (Note: Dropped charges as part of plea deal: Second-degree murder (Powell was previously charged with attempted murder before Ma's death); Felony assault; Hate crime enhancements)
- Sentence: 22 years in prison

Yao Pan Ma
- Traditional Chinese: 馬耀潘
- Simplified Chinese: 马耀潘
Transcriptions
Standard Mandarin
- Hanyu Pinyin: Mǎ Yàopān
Yue: Cantonese
- Yale Romanization: Máah Yiuhpūn
- Jyutping: maa5 jiu6 pun1
other Yue
- Taishanese: ma4 jiu6 pon1

Yao Pan Ma, a 61-year-old Chinese American, was attacked on April 23, 2021, before he was declared dead 8 months later on December 31, as a result of traumatic brain injury caused by blunt force trauma inflicted by 49-year-old African American Jarrod Powell, in East Harlem, New York City. The attack drew national attention as part of a rise in anti-Asian hate crimes in the United States.

== Background ==
Ma and his wife Chen Baozhen (陈宝珍) moved to the United States in October 2018 from Taishan, Guangdong, where Ma had worked as a dim sum chef. Ma worked at a restaurant in New York City until it closed permanently due to the COVID-19 pandemic. As he had not worked long enough to qualify for unemployment benefits, Ma and his wife, who had also lost her job as a home health aide permanently, collected bottles and cans to make money to afford food. With the couple's adult children and grandchildren still in China, they otherwise only received financial support from Chen's retired parents, who were both in their 90s and received a monthly total of $1000 in Social Security.

Since the COVID-19 pandemic started, there has been an uptick in racist incidents and harassment against Asian Americans. A few months prior to the attack against Ma, 84-year-old Thai-American Vicha Ratanapakdee died after being attacked in San Francisco.

== Killing ==
On April 23, 2021, Ma was collecting cans along Third Avenue and East 125th Street in East Harlem. Powell attacked Ma from behind and shoved him to the ground. After kicking Ma's head repeatedly, he fled the scene. A nearby surveillance camera showed the attacker stomping on Ma's head.

Ma was moved in and out of multiple facilities during his time in the hospital and eventually died of cerebral hemorrhage in a long-term care center run by The New Jewish Home on December 31, 2021.

== Perpetrator and legal proceedings ==
Jarrod Powell, a 49-year-old African American man from New York City was arrested. He was charged with attempted murder, felony assault, and hate crime charges. After Ma's death, his family called on the district attorney to upgrade the charges to murder. Charges were later upgraded to second degree murder as a hate crime.

On January 12, 2023, Powell pleaded guilty to manslaughter. He was sentenced to 22 years in prison.

== See also ==
- Killing of Michelle Go, Chinese-American woman pushed in front of an oncoming train in Manhattan in 2022
- Interminority racism in the United States
