= Russell Jeung =

Asian American sociologist

Russell Mark Jeung (Chinese: 張華耀) is an American sociologist at San Francisco State University. He is known for his social activism on racism towards Asian Americans and as the co-founder of Stop AAPI Hate.

== Biography ==
Jeung obtained both his Bachelor of Arts in human biology and his Master of Arts in education at Stanford University in 1984. He further completed an M.A. in sociology (1995) and a Ph.D. in sociology at the University of California, Berkeley (2000). His Ph.D. dissertation, entitled "Emerging Asian American Pan-Ethnic Congregations: The Religious Construction of Symbolic Racial Identity" was later published by Rutgers University Press, with the new title Faithful Generations: Race and new Asian American Churches.

After teaching at Foothill College for two years, he joined the Department of Asian American Studies, San Francisco State University in 2002 and is currently a professor at the department.

== Community activism ==
Jeung is involved in a number of community projects, seeing his activism as a way to live out his Christian religion.

He and Valerie Soe produced The Oak Park Story, a 2010 documentary about his faith-based community organizing in East Oakland among Cambodians and Latinos. It was a Blue Ribbon Award Semi-Finalist.

Jeung is known for helping to launch Stop AAPI Hate in March 2020, in coalition with leaders Cynthia Choi of Chinese for Affirmative Action and Manjusha P. Kulkarni from AAPI Equity Alliance as a response to the increase of racism against Asian Americans during COVID-19. The project provides community resources to assist drafting policy to fight against racism and bullying. Time magazine has named Jeung, together with Kulkarni and Choi, among the 100 most influential people of 2021, for they "have locked arms with other BIPOC organizations to find restorative justice measures so that civil rights—for all vulnerable groups—receive the protection they deserve."

== Works ==
- Jeung, Russell, Karen Umemoto, Harvey Dong, Eric Mar, Lisa Hirai Tsuchitani, and Arnold Pan (2019). Mountain Movers: Student Activism & the Emergence of Asian American Studies. Los Angeles: UCLA Asian American Studies Center. ISBN 9780934052542
- Jeung, Russell, Seanan S. Fong, and Helen Jin Kim (2019). Family Sacrifices: The Worldviews and Ethics of Chinese Americans. New York: Oxford University Press. ISBN 9780190875923
- Jeung, Russell (2016). At Home in Exile: Finding Jesus among My Ancestors and Refugee Neighbors. Grand Rapids, MI: Zondervan. ISBN 9780310527831
- Chen, Carolyn and Russell Jeung (2012). Sustaining Faith Traditions: Race, Ethnicity and Religion Among the Latino and Asian American Second Generation. New York: New York University Press. ISBN 9780814717363
- Jeung, Russell (2004). Faithful Generations: Race and New Asian American Churches. New Brunswick: Rutgers University Press. ISBN 9780813535036.
