= National Council of Asian Pacific Americans =

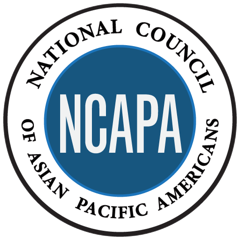
- Abbreviation: NCAPA
- Formation: 1996
- Headquarters: Washington D.C., United States
- Website: ncapaonline.org

The National Council of Asian Pacific Americans (NCAPA) is a coalition of 35 national Asian-Pacific American organizations in the United States. Founded in 1996 and based in Washington D.C., NCAPA seeks to expand the influence of Asian-Pacific Americans in the legislative and legal arenas, and enhance the public's and mass media's awareness and sensitivity to Asian-Pacific American concerns.

== Executive committee ==
The NCAPA executive committee is constituted by executive directors of member organizations.

The current executive committee is as follows:

- Thu Nguyen, chair, OCA – Asian Pacific American Advocates
- Becky Belcore, National Korean American Service & Education Consortium (NAKASEC)
- Jeff Caballero, Association of Asian Pacific Community Health Organizations (AAPCHO)
- Linda Akutagawa, Leadership Education for Asian Pacifics (LEAP)
- Monica Khant, Asian Pacific Institute on Gender Based Violence (API-GBV)

Past chairs include:

- Quyen Dinh, Southeast Asia Resource Action Center (SEARAC)
- Kathy Ko Chin, Asian & Pacific Islander American Health Forum (APIAHF)
- Michelle Kauhane, Council for Native Hawaiian Advancement (CNHA)
- Gregory Cendana, former executive director, Asian Pacific American Labor Alliance
- Deepa Iyer, former executive director, South Asian Americans Leading Together
- Floyd Mori, president & CEO, Asian Pacific American Institute for Congressional Studies
- Lisa Hasegawa, executive director, National Coalition of Asian Pacific American Community Development
- Karen Narasaki, executive director of Asian American Justice Center
- Daphne Kwok, founding NCAPA chair and former executive director of OCA; Daphne Kwok is also the current chair to the President's Advisory Council on Asian American Pacific Islanders

== Members ==
NCAPA coalition members work together on various policy issues such as Civil & Human Rights, Education, Health, Housing & Economic Justice, and Immigration. Each of these policy issues has a committee which meets on a regular basis focusing on the key issues of the moment to ensure that the AA & NHPI voice is heard and at the table regarding these matters.

The coalition members are as follows:

- AAPI Data
- Act to Change
- Asian & Pacific Islander American Health Forum | APIAHF
- Asian & Pacific Islander American Vote | APIAVote
- Asian Americans Advancing Justice | AAJC
- Asian Pacific American Labor Alliance, AFL-CIO | APALA
- Asian Pacific Partners for Empowerment, Advocacy, and Leadership | APPEAL
- Association of Asian Pacific Community Health Organizations | AAPCHO
- Boat People SOS
- Council for Native Hawaiian Advancement | CNHA
- Hmong National Development, Inc. | HND
- Japanese American Citizens League | JACL
- Laotian American National Alliance | LANA
- National Asian American Pacific Islander Mental Health Association | NAAPIMHA
- National Asian Pacific American Bar Association | NAPABA
- National Asian Pacific American Families Against Substance Abuse | NAPAFASA
- National Asian Pacific American Women's Forum | NAPAWF
- National Asian Pacific Center on Aging | NAPCA
- National Coalition for Asian Pacific American Community Development | NCAPACD
- National Council of Asian Pacific Islander Physicians | NCAPIP
- National Korean American Service & Education Consortium | NAKASEC
- National Queer Asian Pacific Islander Alliance | NQAPIA
- Organization of Chinese Americans - Asian Pacific American Advocates | OCA
- Sikh American Legal Defense and Education Fund | SALDEF
- South Asian Americans Leading Together | SAALT
- South Asian Bar Association of North America | SABA
- Southeast Asia Resource Action Center | SEARAC

Additional affiliate members include:

- Asian & Pacific Islander American Scholarship Fund | APIASF
- Asian American Psychological Association | AAPA
- Asian Pacific American Institute for Congressional Studies | APAICS
- Center for Asian American Media | CAAM
- Center for Asian Pacific American Women | CAPAW
- Leadership Education for Asian Pacifics | LEAP
- National Association of Asian American Professionals | NAAAP
- National Federation of Filipino American Associations | NaFFAA
- National Japanese American Memorial Foundation | NJAMF

== History ==
The 1990s saw significant growth in the number and size of Asian-Pacific American (APA) organizations. Nevertheless, many of these organizations spoke for only a segment of the broader community. The push to create an organization gained additional impetus after the 1996 United States campaign finance controversy, in which Asian-Pacific Americans played a significant role. At the July 1996 Organization of Chinese Americans convention in Chicago, Illinois, the leaders of several APA organizations agreed that there was a need for an advocacy coalition which would bring together APA organizations on the local, state, regional and national levels. Former U.S. Representative Norman Mineta assisted the group in convening a series of meetings to discuss the new organization's mission and functions.

NCAPA was formally constituted in 1997. Daphne Kwok of the Organization of Chinese Americans was elected the organization's first chairperson.

NCAPA has been primarily active in politics. In 2000, the group strongly criticized Senator John McCain for using the "gooks" to describe his North Vietnamese prison guards. Four years later, NCAPA took a more proactive role by issuing a first-of-its-kind political platform addressing APA issues, and asking presidential candidates to adopt the platform as their own.

In 2007, after the Virginia Tech massacre, NCAPA worked to counteract discrimination against Asian-Pacific Americans and negative images of APAs in the national media.

On May 8, 2013, members of the coalition met with President Obama and senior staff to discuss topics of immigration, health care, and civil rights. Much of the conversation centered on the comprehensive immigration reform starting to make its way through Congress. In particular, the AAPI leaders zeroed on family reunification measures that are critical to immigrant communities. Participants included Asian American leaders from APALA, APIAHF, CNHA, NCAPACD, OCA, AAPCHO, NCAPA, SAALT, APAICS, AAJC, JACL, SEARAC, NAPAWF, and NAKASEC.
