= Filipino Americans in Hampton Roads =

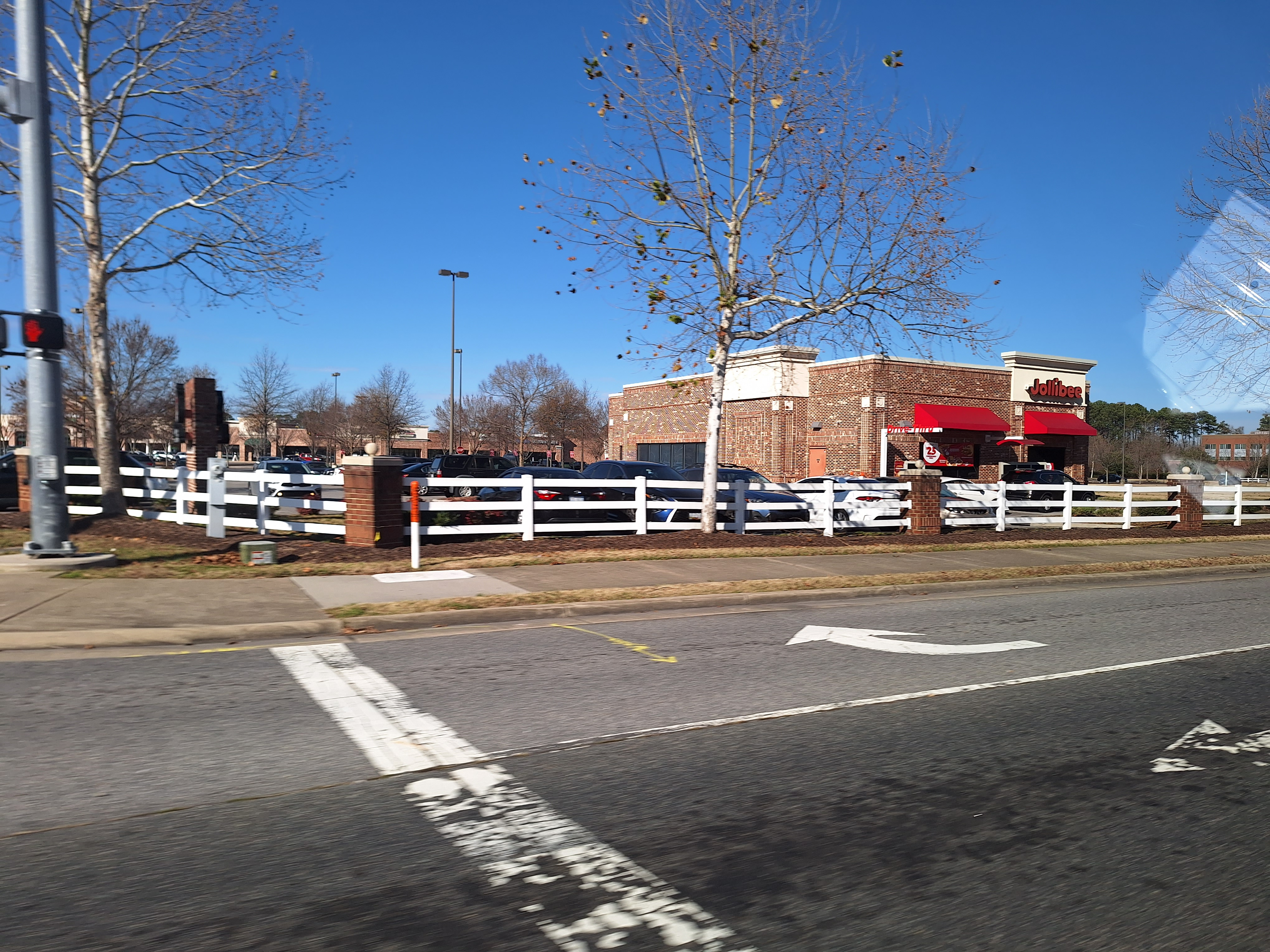
Jollibee in Virginia Beach, Virginia

Filipino Americans reside in the Hampton Roads area in the state of Virginia; in 2010 around 40,000 people of Filipino origin lived in that region. In 2000 the population count was around 45,000. As of 2007, there were not many other ethnic settlements in the metropolitan area. On the East Coast of the United States, this is the largest group of people of Filipino ancestry.

== History ==
Many people from the Philippines enlisted in the United States Navy and became U.S. citizens, settling around Navy facilities. U.S. citizenship is a possibility after serving a term of enlistment. Jeffrey Acosta, the husband of a historian, also stated that the Navy paid relatively well for Philippine standards, even if the work was not paid as much compared to work for U.S. citizens. In turn, nurses of Philippine ancestry and Filipinos of other occupations also moved to Hampton Roads.

Filipinos began establishing businesses in the Hampton Roads area in the 1960s.

In the 1990s Filipino cultural organizations began advocating attention towards gangs made up of young people of Filipino ancestry, and the Filipino-American Community Action Group (FIL-AM CAG) responded by establishing a "truce dance".

In 2021 the state government announced plans to establish a historical marker in Virginia Beach that would show recognition to Filipino men working in the US Navy and their immigration to the Hampton Roads area.

== Geography ==
In 2022, Norie Quintos of National Geographic stated that Kempsville, Virginia Beach formed "the heart of the Philippine American community." Olongapo in the Philippines is a sister city of Virginia Beach.

In 2010, 17,930 people of Filipino ancestry lived in Virginia Beach. The numbers in other municipalities were as follows: 4,727 in Norfolk, 3,050 in Chesapeake, 1,164 in Newport News, 508 in Portsmouth, 491 in Hampton, and 488 in Suffolk.

== Institutions ==
The Filipino-American Community Action Group (FIL-AM CAG) began operations in 1991.

The Philippine Cultural Center (PCC) is located in Virginia Beach. Council of United Filipino Organizations of Tidewater created this institution in 2000. It has the School for Creative and Performing Arts (SCAPA) program for children.

== Recreation ==
Fil Fest USA is celebrated in Virginia Beach.

Philippine Independence Day is celebrated in Virginia Beach as Fil Am Friendship Day.

== See also ==
- Killing of Bert Atienza
