= Center for Asian Pacific American Women =

The Center for Asian Pacific American Women (CAPAW) is an American non-profit organization dedicated to the improvement of leadership skills for Asian American women, including native Hawaiians and Pacific Islanders. Based in San Francisco, the organization addresses community development, education and employment.

== History ==
Founded in 1996 by Martha Lee and 18 Asian American women, the organization was called the Asian Pacific American Women's Leadership Institute. It started with a hundred "Founding Sisters" in Denver, Colorado, who each donated a hundred dollars to further the leadership skills of a hundred Asian Pacific women professionals, politicians and labor organizers. The institute was also financially supported by the Kellogg Foundation which granted over $600,000. In 2006, the name was changed to reflect the extended outreach of programs which not only cover the original three-week leadership training courses but contribute to locally oriented initiatives. The organization also holds annual conferences.

They are headquartered in San Francisco, California and their Mission Statement states, "Building Whole Person Leaders One at a Time."

The Center for Asian Pacific American Women is one of the 31 organizations represented by the Washington, D.C.–based National Council of Asian Pacific Americans.

== Leadership ==
Sue Ann Hong is the current President and CEO of CAPAW. She was the interim executive director in 2018 and then was promoted to president and CEO in January 2020. Before that, she worked at State Farm for over 28 years in various positions such as Data Processing, Diversity & Inclusion, and Business and Technology Portfolio Management. She holds a bachelor's from University of Kansas in Business Management and an MBA from Western Michigan University. She resides in Atlanta, Georgia.

There are ten members of the organization's board of directors.
