= Asian Pacific Americans =

Ethnic descriptive term

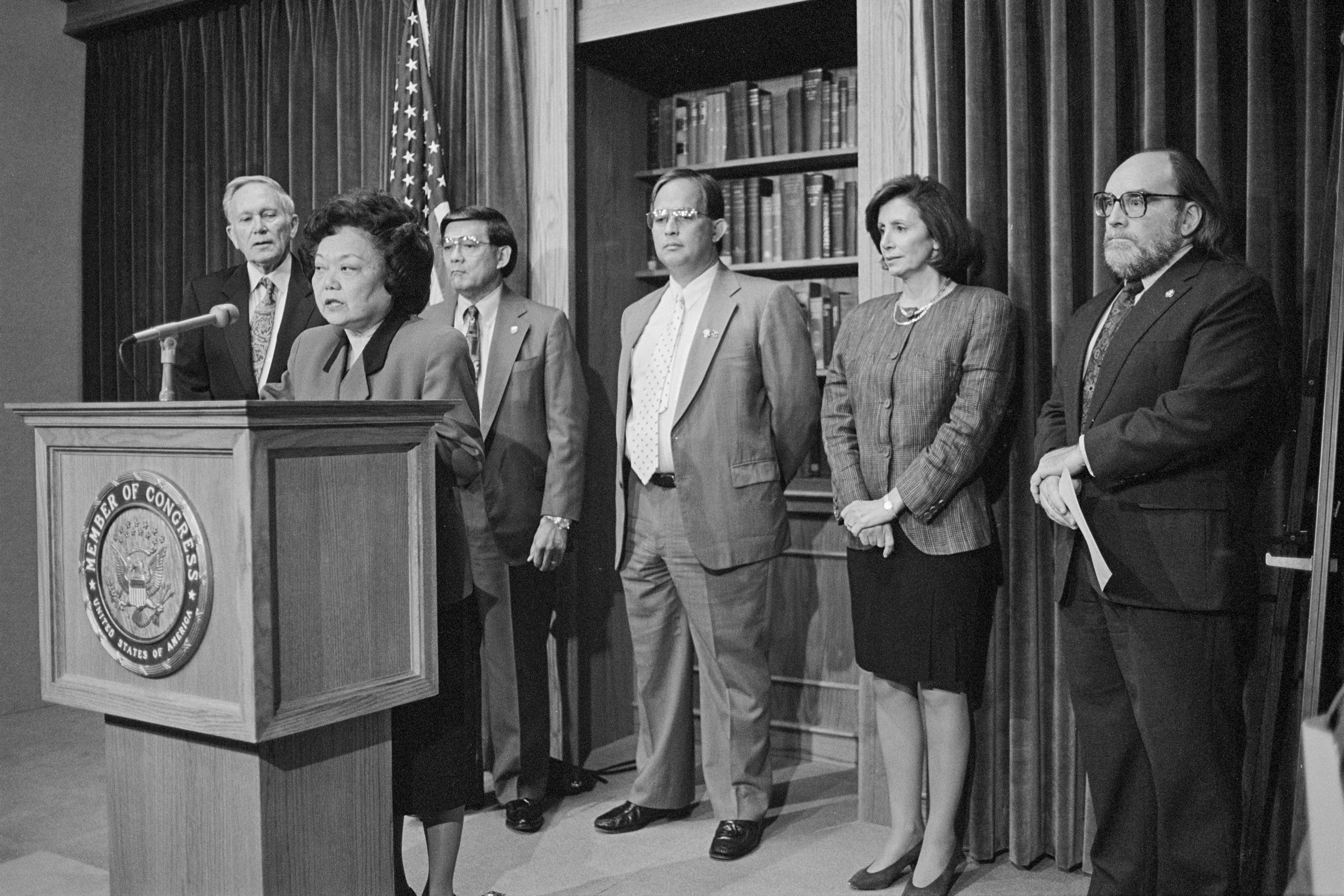
Representative Patsy Mink declares the formation of the Congressional Asian Pacific American Caucus in 1994

Asian/Pacific American (APA) or Asian/Pacific Islander (API) or Asian American and Pacific Islanders (AAPI) or Asian American and Native Hawaiians/Pacific Islander (AANHPI) is a term sometimes used in the United States when including both Asian and Pacific Islander Americans.

The U.S. Department of Labor Office of Federal Contract Compliance Programs defined Asian-Pacific Islander as "A person with origins in any of the original peoples of the Far East (i.e. East and Southeast Asia), Indian subcontinent, or the Pacific Islands." The National Park Service says AAPI 'history and heritage include experiences of people with cultural, religious, and linguistic traditions' from countries like China, India, and Japan. The category also encompasses people from areas such as the Ryukyu Islands, Taiwan, Korea, Indonesia, the Philippines, Singapore, Samoa, Thailand, and Vietnam; and in South Asia, Pakistan, Bangladesh, Sri Lanka, Nepal, and Bhutan. Indigenous Australians are included as they fall under the Pacific Islander American umbrella, along with the separate Australian native group of Torres Strait Islanders, who are considered Melanesians. Indigenous peoples of the Aleutian Islands do not fall within the APA category, due to being considered Alaskan Natives rather than Pacific Islander Americans.

The APA category does not include people of European origin from the Pacific, such as those from Australia, Hawaii, New Zealand, Ecuador's Galápagos Islands and Russia's Sakhalin and Kuril Islands. It also does not include Russians of European origin from the Far East Asian regions of the country.

== History ==
"Asian or Pacific Islander" was an option to indicate race and ethnicity in the United States censuses in the 1990 and 2000 censuses as well as in several Census Bureau studies in between, including Current Population Surveys reports and updates between 1994 and 2002. A 1997 Office of Management and Budget directive separated the "Asian or Pacific Islander" racial category into two categories: "Asian" and "Native Hawaiian and Other Pacific Islander." Following this change, the U.S. Census Bureau defined Asian as "a person having origins in any of the original people of the Far East, for example, Indonesia, Cambodia, China, India, Japan, Korea, Taiwan, Malaysia, Pakistan, the Philippine Islands, Singapore, Thailand, and Vietnam." The U.S. Census Bureau defined Native Hawaiian or other Pacific Islander as "a person having origins in any of the original people of Hawaii, Guam, Samoa, or other Pacific Islands." The map of Micronesian, Polynesian, and Melanesian groups, courtesy of L.A-based organization Empowering Pacific Islander Communities (EPIC), reflects who is considered Pacific Islander per federal guidelines.

The term is used in reference to Asian/Pacific American Heritage Week, the first ten days of May, established in 1978 by a joint resolution in the United States Congress. The commemorative week was expanded to a month (Asian Pacific American Heritage Month) by Congress in 1992. The month of May was chosen to celebrate the first immigration of Japanese Americans on May 7, 1843, and to honor the Chinese Americans who contributed to the transcontinental railroad which was completed on May 10, 1869.

The federal government defines the term AAPI to include "all people of Asian, Asian American, or Pacific Islander ancestry who trace their origins to the countries, states, jurisdictions and/or the diasporic communities of these geographic regions."

The term is also used by several state boards and commissions, including in Washington, Michigan, Maryland, and Connecticut. The term is also used in the names of several non-profit groups, such as the A|P|A History Collective, Center for Asian Pacific American Women, Asian & Pacific Islander American Scholarship Fund, and National Coalition for Asian Pacific American Community Development. Asian Pacific Americans are listed as a group on the United States Army website.

== Creation of the term ==
Previous to the 1960s, the only term used to refer to Americans with ancestry in Asia was "orientals." The pan-racial identity Asian American was created in the 1960s. Chinese American, Filipino American, and Japanese American college students in the San Francisco Bay Area were concerned with the living conditions in primarily Asian American residential areas, and took inspiration from the advances made by the Black Civil Rights Movement. Asian American college students also fought for the inclusion of their stories in college curriculum.

In 1968, students of Asian heritage, Yuji Ichioka and Emma Gee, first coined the term Asian American in Berkeley, California, at UC Berkeley, to unify their efforts for political and social recognition—and command respect.

The murder of Chinese American Vincent Chin in 1982 by two White Chrysler workers who apparently mistook him for a person of Japanese descent and attacked him as a representative of the rising dominance of the Japanese auto sector in the U.S., and the light penalty the two assailants were perceived to have been given, furthered the pan-racial movement for Asian American rights, bringing awareness of the shared struggles amongst the various pan-ethnic Asian American groups.

Lily Chin stated: "What kind of law is this? What kind of justice? This happened because my son is Chinese. If two Chinese killed a white person, they must go to jail, maybe for their whole lives... Something is wrong with this country." In the 1980s, the term Asian Pacific American began to be used in Asian American Studies and Asian American pan-racial social movements. It is also believed by some authors that Asian Americans and Pacific Islanders had shared experiences with colonialism and had been connected historically through trade and cultures.

== Reception ==
The Asian Pacific Islander category has resulted in mixed reactions amongst academia and others. In a 1997 federal report, the census definition of Asian Pacific Islanders was criticized for being ambiguous, since it did not distinguish the difference between Asians and Pacific Islanders, leading to potential confusion around the classification of people from Asian-related islands in the Pacific, such as Japan and the Philippines. In 1997, the census definition was also criticized for not explicitly mentioning whether the culturally distinct areas of Australia and New Guinea were included under the Pacific Islander umbrella. The census still does not explicitly state whether or not natives from Australia and New Guinea are included, despite officially counting people from these areas under Pacific Islander American statistics.

Scholars, such as Stacy Nguyen, Dr. J. Kehaulani Kauanui, and Lisa Kahaleole Hall have argued that Asian American should be separate from Pacific Islander. This is because Pacific Islanders experience a different set of struggles than Asian Americans. While Asian Americans suffer from immigration issues, Pacific Islanders are fighting for decolonization and sovereignty. The term Asian Pacific Islander often focuses on issues facing the Asian American community while ignoring issues facing the Pacific Islander community.

In "Remapping a Theoretical Space for Hawaiian Women and Indigenous Women," Hall argues that Asian Pacific Islander movements, as well as mainstream feminist movements, have failed to address issues specific to just Pacific Islanders. Pacific Islanders face a different set of struggles than Asian Americans when it comes to land sovereignty and colonization. These struggles have not been included in APA discourses. The term further perpetuates the lack of accurate information about Pacific Islander communities.

In "Where are Native Hawaiians and Other Pacific Islanders in Higher Education?" Kaunanui argues the term has prevented Pacific Islanders at higher institutions from receiving economic and social resources at higher institutions. Higher institutions address the racial oppression that Asian Americans face, such as the "whiz kid" stereotypes, but fail to address that Pacific Islanders are stereotyped as lazy and not hard-working. Kaunanui continues to argue higher institutions should specifically target "Native Hawaiian and other Pacific Islander" students in recruitment efforts because the students of that category are underrepresented in higher institutions. In order to target "Native Hawaiian and Pacific Islander" students, the term Pacific Islander should be separated from the term Asian.

Lucy Hu argues Pacific Islanders and Asian Americans face a completely different set of racial and economic issues. The term Asian Pacific Islander, or Asian-Pacific American erases the struggles Pacific Islanders face separately from Asian Americans. While the Asian American community has a higher median annual income than the national average, many Pacific Islanders are living below the poverty line.

Other scholars believe that Asian Pacific Islander movements should include both Asian Americans and Pacific Islanders. In "Pan-Pacific Identity: A Skeptical Asian American Response," Young argues that Pacific Islanders experience a different set of struggles than Asian Americans, but are ultimately racialized by society in the same ways, such as being seen as "foreigners." She believes that the term Pan-Pacific should continue to be used, but should be more inclusive of Pacific Islanders in social movements. Pan-pacific movements should include the decolonization of the Pacific Islands in its platforms.

In "Whither the Asian American Coalition," Spickard argues that the histories and of both Asian Americans and Pacific Islanders are linked. Colonization in the Pacific Islands is not a reason to separate the term API. He asserts that colonization has occurred in many Asian nations, such as the Philippines, Vietnam, and Japan, as well. What all of these groups have in common is struggles with colonialism, orientalism, and racial hierarchies. Asian Pacific American movements should work to include the struggles facing all groups under the pan-racial umbrella of Asian Pacific American.

== Historical demographics ==
Asian and Pacific Islander % of Population by U.S. State (1860–2010)^{[a]}
State/Territory	1860	1870	1880	1890	1900	1910	1920	1930	1940	1950	1960	1970	1980	1990	2000	2010
United States of America	0.1%	0.2%	0.2%	0.2%	0.2%	0.2%	0.2%	0.2%	0.2%	0.2%	0.5%	0.8%	1.5%	2.9%	3.8%	4.8%
Alabama	0.0%	0.0%	0.0%	0.0%	0.0%	0.0%	0.0%	0.0%	0.0%	0.0%	0.0%	0.1%	0.2%	0.5%	0.7%	1.1%
Alaska				7.1%	5.3%	3.8%	0.8%	0.8%	1.0%		0.8%	0.9%	2.0%	3.6%	4.5%	5.4%
Arizona	0.0%	0.2%	4.0%	1.3%	1.4%	0.8%	0.5%	0.6%	0.5%	0.4%	0.4%	0.5%	0.8%	1.5%	1.9%	2.8%
Arkansas	0.0%	0.0%	0.0%	0.0%	0.0%	0.0%	0.0%	0.0%	0.0%	0.0%	0.1%	0.1%	0.3%	0.5%	0.9%	1.2%
California	9.2%	8.8%	8.7%	6.1%	3.8%	3.4%	3.1%	3.0%	2.4%	1.7%	2.0%	2.8%	5.3%	9.6%	11.2%	13.0%
Colorado	0.0%	0.0%	0.3%	0.3%	0.1%	0.3%	0.3%	0.4%	0.3%	0.5%	0.5%	0.5%	1.0%	1.8%	2.3%	2.8%
Connecticut	0.0%	0.0%	0.0%	0.0%	0.1%	0.0%	0.1%	0.0%	0.0%	0.1%	0.1%	0.2%	0.6%	1.5%	2.4%	3.8%
Delaware	0.0%	0.0%	0.0%	0.0%	0.0%	0.0%	0.0%	0.0%	0.0%	0.0%	0.1%	0.3%	0.7%	1.4%	2.1%	3.2%
(Washington, D.C.) District of Columbia	0.0%	0.0%	0.0%	0.0%	0.2%	0.1%	0.2%	0.2%	0.2%	0.4%	0.6%	0.7%	1.0%	1.8%	2.8%	3.5%
Florida	0.0%	0.0%	0.0%	0.0%	0.0%	0.0%	0.0%	0.0%	0.0%	0.0%	0.1%	0.2%	0.6%	1.2%	1.8%	2.4%
(Georgia (U.S. state)) Georgia	0.0%	0.0%	0.0%	0.0%	0.0%	0.0%	0.0%	0.0%	0.0%	0.0%	0.1%	0.1%	0.4%	1.2%	2.2%	3.2%
Hawaii					80.9%	76.5%	78.4%	78.0%	73.3%	72.9%	65.3%	57.7%	60.5%	61.8%	51.0%	48.6%
Idaho	28.5%	10.4%	2.4%	2.3%	1.7%	0.7%	0.5%	0.4%	0.3%	0.4%	0.4%	0.5%	0.6%	0.9%	1.0%	1.2%
Illinois	0.0%	0.0%	0.0%	0.0%	0.0%	0.0%	0.1%	0.1%	0.1%	0.2%	0.2%	0.4%	1.4%	2.5%	3.4%	4.6%
Indiana	0.0%	0.0%	0.0%	0.0%	0.0%	0.0%	0.0%	0.0%	0.0%	0.0%	0.1%	0.1%	0.4%	0.7%	1.0%	1.6%
Iowa	0.0%	0.0%	0.0%	0.0%	0.0%	0.0%	0.0%	0.0%	0.0%	0.0%	0.0%	0.1%	0.4%	0.9%	1.3%	1.7%
Kansas	0.0%	0.0%	0.0%	0.0%	0.0%	0.0%	0.0%	0.0%	0.0%	0.0%	0.1%	0.2%	0.6%	1.3%	1.7%	2.4%
Kentucky	0.0%	0.0%	0.0%	0.0%	0.0%	0.0%	0.0%	0.0%	0.0%	0.0%	0.0%	0.1%	0.3%	0.5%	0.7%	1.1%
Louisiana	0.0%	0.0%	0.1%	0.0%	0.0%	0.0%	0.0%	0.0%	0.0%	0.0%	0.1%	0.1%	0.6%	1.0%	1.2%	1.5%
Maine	0.0%	0.0%	0.0%	0.0%	0.0%	0.0%	0.0%	0.0%	0.0%	0.0%	0.1%	0.1%	0.3%	0.5%	0.7%	1.0%
Maryland	0.0%	0.0%	0.0%	0.0%	0.0%	0.0%	0.0%	0.1%	0.0%	0.1%	0.2%	0.5%	1.5%	2.9%	4.0%	5.5%
Massachusetts	0.0%	0.0%	0.0%	0.0%	0.1%	0.1%	0.1%	0.1%	0.1%	0.1%	0.2%	0.4%	0.9%	2.4%	3.8%	5.3%
Michigan	0.0%	0.0%	0.0%	0.0%	0.0%	0.0%	0.0%	0.0%	0.0%	0.1%	0.1%	0.2%	0.6%	1.1%	1.8%	2.4%
Minnesota	0.0%	0.0%	0.0%	0.0%	0.0%	0.0%	0.0%	0.0%	0.0%	0.1%	0.1%	0.2%	0.7%	1.8%	2.9%	4.0%
Mississippi	0.0%	0.0%	0.0%	0.0%	0.0%	0.0%	0.0%	0.0%	0.0%	0.1%	0.1%	0.1%	0.3%	0.5%	0.7%	0.9%
Missouri	0.0%	0.0%	0.0%	0.0%	0.0%	0.0%	0.0%	0.0%	0.0%	0.0%	0.1%	0.2%	0.5%	0.8%	1.2%	1.6%
Montana		9.5%	4.5%	1.8%	1.7%	0.6%	0.4%	0.3%	0.2%	0.2%	0.2%	0.2%	0.3%	0.5%	0.6%	0.6%
Nebraska	0.0%	0.0%	0.0%	0.0%	0.0%	0.1%	0.1%	0.1%	0.0%	0.1%	0.1%	0.2%	0.4%	0.8%	1.3%	1.8%
Nevada	0.0%	7.3%	8.7%	6.0%	3.7%	2.3%	1.9%	1.3%	0.7%	0.5%	0.5%	0.7%	1.8%	3.2%	4.9%	7.2%
New Hampshire	0.0%	0.0%	0.0%	0.0%	0.0%	0.0%	0.0%	0.0%	0.0%	0.0%	0.1%	0.2%	0.3%	0.8%	1.3%	2.2%
New Jersey	0.0%	0.0%	0.0%	0.0%	0.1%	0.1%	0.1%	0.1%	0.0%	0.1%	0.1%	0.3%	1.4%	3.5%	5.7%	8.3%
New Mexico	0.0%	0.0%	0.0%	0.2%	0.2%	0.2%	0.1%	0.1%	0.1%	0.1%	0.2%	0.2%	0.5%	0.9%	1.2%	1.4%
(New York (state)) New York	0.0%	0.0%	0.0%	0.1%	0.1%	0.1%	0.1%	0.1%	0.1%	0.2%	0.3%	0.7%	1.8%	3.9%	5.5%	7.3%
North Carolina	0.0%	0.0%	0.0%	0.0%	0.0%	0.0%	0.0%	0.0%	0.0%	0.0%	0.0%	0.1%	0.4%	0.8%	1.4%	2.2%
North Dakota		0.0%	0.0%	0.0%	0.1%	0.0%	0.0%	0.0%	0.0%	0.0%	0.0%	0.1%	0.3%	0.5%	0.6%	1.0%
Ohio	0.0%	0.0%	0.0%	0.0%	0.0%	0.0%	0.0%	0.0%	0.0%	0.0%	0.1%	0.2%	0.4%	0.8%	1.2%	1.7%
Oklahoma				0.0%	0.0%	0.0%	0.0%	0.0%	0.0%	0.0%	0.1%	0.1%	0.6%	1.1%	1.5%	1.7%
Oregon	0.0%	3.7%	5.4%	3.0%	3.1%	1.6%	1.0%	0.9%	0.6%	0.4%	0.5%	0.7%	1.3%	2.4%	3.2%	3.7%
Pennsylvania	0.0%	0.0%	0.0%	0.0%	0.0%	0.0%	0.0%	0.0%	0.0%	0.0%	0.1%	0.2%	0.5%	1.2%	1.8%	2.7%
Rhode Island	0.0%	0.0%	0.0%	0.0%	0.1%	0.1%	0.0%	0.0%	0.0%	0.1%	0.1%	0.4%	0.6%	1.8%	2.4%	2.9%
South Carolina	0.0%	0.0%	0.0%	0.0%	0.0%	0.0%	0.0%	0.0%	0.0%	0.0%	0.0%	0.1%	0.4%	0.6%	0.9%	1.3%
South Dakota	0.0%	0.0%	0.2%	0.1%	0.0%	0.0%	0.0%	0.0%	0.0%	0.0%	0.0%	0.1%	0.3%	0.4%	0.6%	0.9%
Tennessee	0.0%	0.0%	0.0%	0.0%	0.0%	0.0%	0.0%	0.0%	0.0%	0.0%	0.0%	0.1%	0.3%	0.7%	1.0%	1.4%
Texas	0.0%	0.0%	0.0%	0.0%	0.0%	0.0%	0.0%	0.0%	0.0%	0.1%	0.1%	0.2%	0.8%	1.9%	2.8%	3.8%
Utah	0.0%	0.5%	0.3%	0.4%	0.4%	0.7%	0.7%	0.8%	0.5%	0.7%	0.6%	0.6%	1.0%	1.9%	2.4%	2.0%
Vermont	0.0%	0.0%	0.0%	0.0%	0.0%	0.0%	0.0%	0.0%	0.0%	0.0%	0.0%	0.1%	0.3%	0.6%	0.9%	1.3%
Virginia	0.0%	0.0%	0.0%	0.0%	0.0%	0.0%	0.0%	0.0%	0.0%	0.0%	0.1%	0.3%	1.2%	2.6%	3.8%	5.5%
(Washington (state)) Washington	0.0%	1.0%	4.2%	1.0%	1.8%	1.4%	1.5%	1.5%	1.1%	0.7%	1.0%	1.3%	2.5%	4.3%	5.9%	7.2%
West Virginia	0.0%	0.0%	0.0%	0.0%	0.0%	0.0%	0.0%	0.0%	0.0%	0.0%	0.0%	0.1%	0.3%	0.4%	0.5%	0.7%
Wisconsin	0.0%	0.0%	0.0%	0.0%	0.0%	0.0%	0.0%	0.0%	0.0%	0.0%	0.1%	0.2%	0.4%	1.1%	1.7%	2.3%
Wyoming		1.6%	4.4%	0.7%	0.9%	1.3%	0.8%	0.5%	0.3%	0.2%	0.2%	0.3%	0.4%	0.6%	0.7%	0.8%
Puerto Rico															0.2%	0.2%

aThe data for 2000 is generated by adding the Asian and Pacific Islander populations from two different sources both by the U.S. Census Bureau.

== See also ==
- Asian Pacific American Heritage Month
- Pan-Asianism
- Stop Asian Hate
- Stop AAPI Hate
- National Asian Pacific American Women's Forum
- Combating Anti-Asian Hate
- Asian American and Pacific Islander - NAMI
