= Anza Vista, San Francisco =

Neighborhood in San Francisco, USA

Coordinates: 37.78087°N 122.44319°W

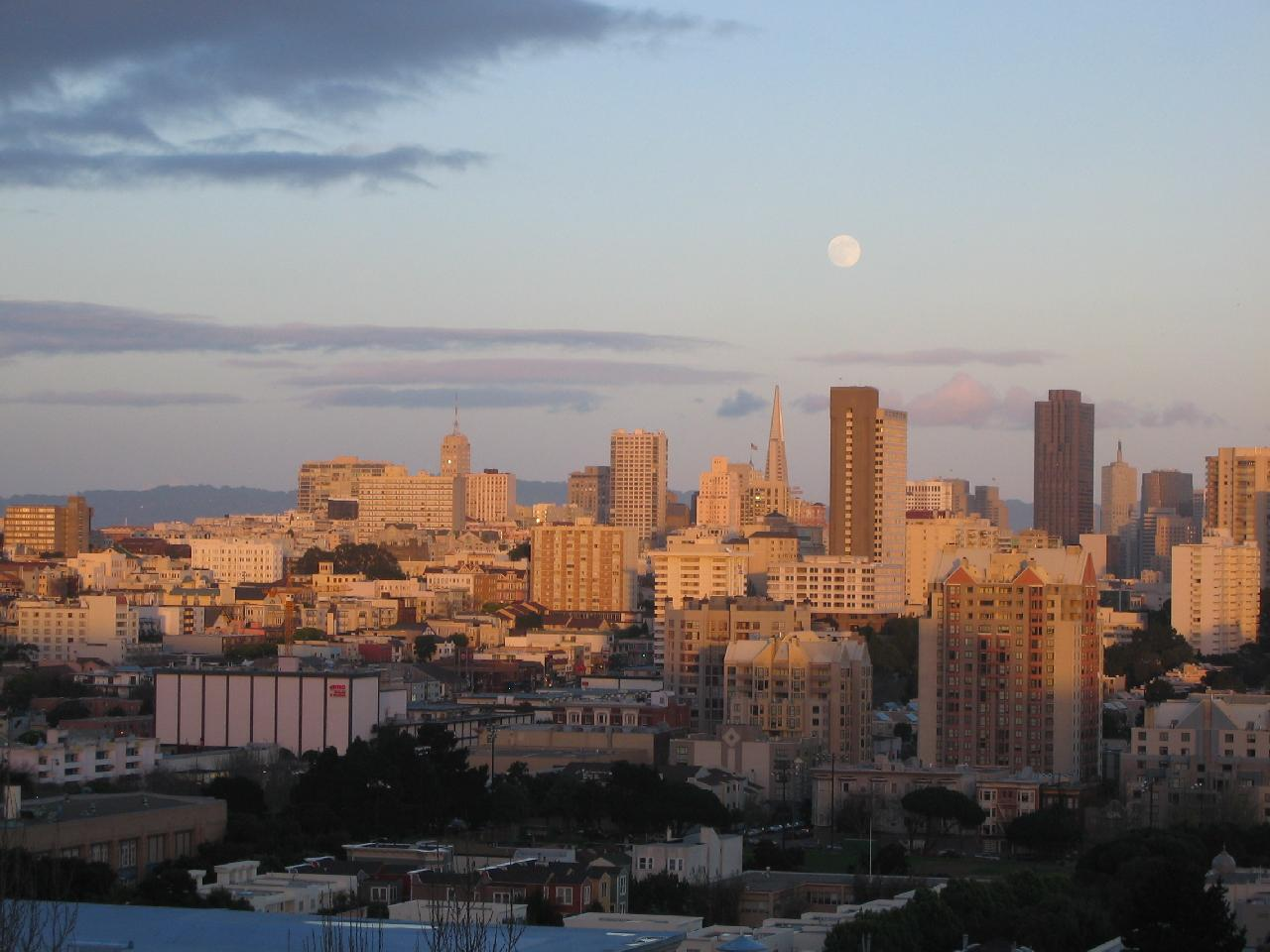
A view from Baker Street in Anza Vista looking East towards downtown

Anza Vista is a neighborhood in the Western Addition district of San Francisco, California. It is named after Juan Bautista de Anza, the first Spanish explorer to reach San Francisco.

== History ==
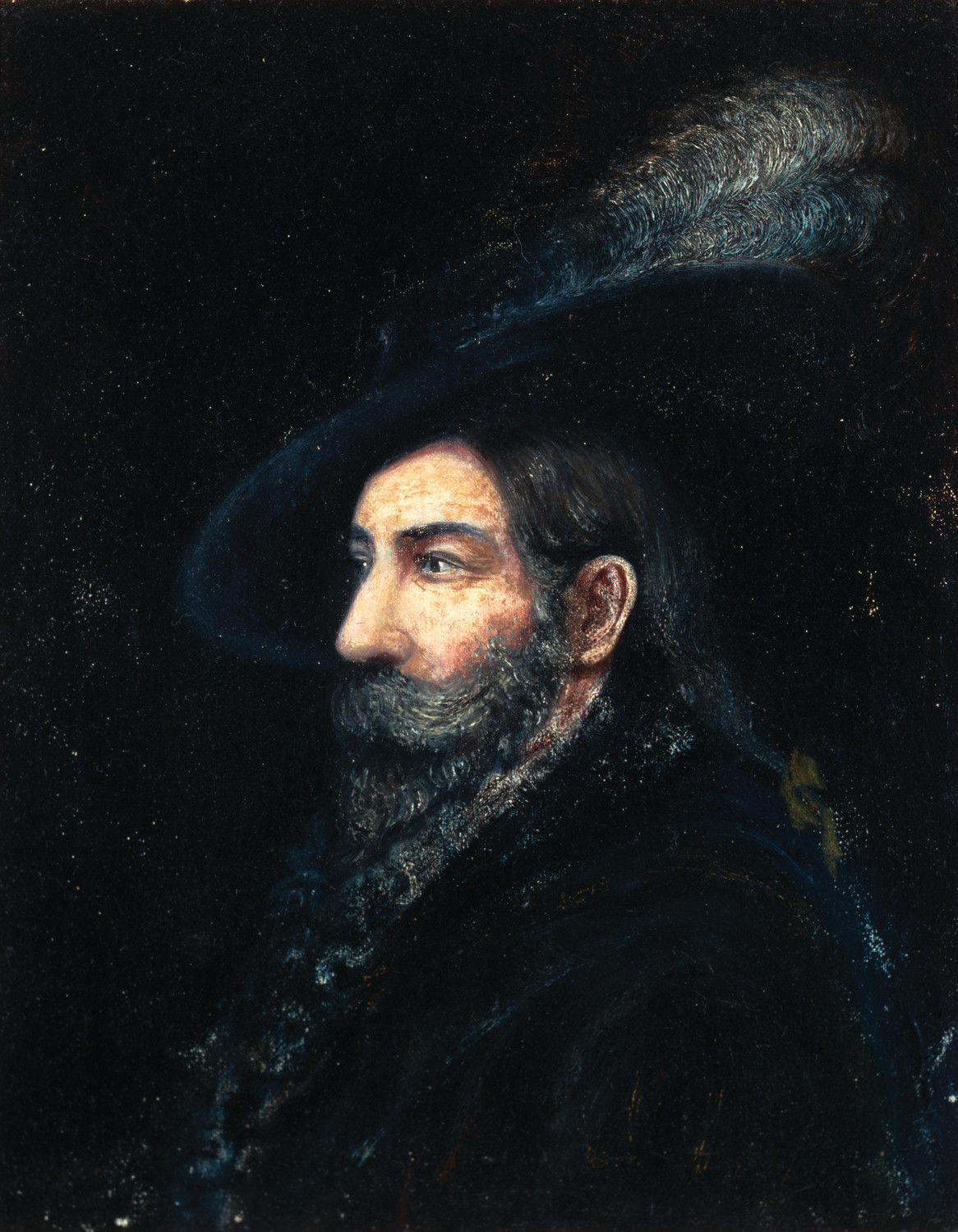
Anza Vista is named after Juan Bautista de Anza.

It sits atop the former location of the San Francisco Calvary Cemetery. Graves in this cemetery, along with all graves in San Francisco, were moved in the 1930s and 1940s to Colma after burials in San Francisco were banned in 1902 at all but two cemeteries to increase available real estate.

== Geography ==
Anza Vista is located between Geary Boulevard to the north, Turk Street to the south, Masonic Avenue to the west and Divisadero Street to the east. Some of the surrounding areas between The Presidio, Golden Gate Park, the Panhandle, and the Western Addition may sometimes be referred to as part of the Anza Vista neighborhood.

== Economy ==
A Target-anchored shopping center, The City Center, is located on Geary Boulevard and Masonic Avenue in the northwestern corner of the neighborhood.

Anza Vista is also the location of a Kaiser Permanente hospital on Geary Boulevard at St. Joseph's Avenue, and the Raoul Wallenberg Traditional High School on Nido Avenue.
