= Killing of Michelle Go =

2022 homicide in New York City, U.S.

- Undated photo of Go
- Date: January 15, 2022; 4 years ago
- Location: New York City, New York, U.S.
- Type: Homicide by pushing
- Motive: Psychosis
- Target: Michelle Alyssa Go, aged 40
- Accused: Martial Simon (deemed unfit to stand trial)
- Charges: Second-degree murder

Michelle Go
- Chinese: 高慧民
Transcriptions
Standard Mandarin
- Hanyu Pinyin: Gāo Huìmín
Yue: Cantonese
- Jyutping: Gōu Waimàhn

Michelle Alyssa Go (December 29, 1981 – January 15, 2022) was a 40-year-old Chinese-American woman who was pushed into the path of an oncoming New York City Subway train at the Times Square–42nd Street station, resulting in her death. The suspect, Martial Simon, was subsequently arrested and charged with second-degree murder.

== Biography ==
Michelle Go was born to Justin and Marjorie Go on December 29, 1981, in Berkeley, California. She was their first child. Their second daughter Marissa died in infancy. Go grew up in Fremont, California, with her parents and her brother Jefferey. Circa 1994, she attended American High School in Fremont, where she was a member of the Honor Society as well as a cheerleader. She graduated in 1998. She studied economics at University of California, Los Angeles, graduating with a degree in economics in 2002. She first worked at Ferguson Plumbing Supply in Pasadena, California, as a customer service and sales representative.

In 2010, she obtained a Master of Business Administration from the New York University Stern School of Business. She worked at Barclays Capital, before joining financial firm Deloitte, where she worked in mergers and acquisitions.

Go was known for her volunteer work. She had worked with the New York Junior League (NYJL) for over a decade, helping many low-income New Yorkers. The NYJL released a statement after her death.

== Death ==
On January 15, 2022, Go left her apartment on the Upper West Side of New York City and was waiting for an R train at Times Square–42nd Street station. According to police, at about 9:30 a.m. Go was pushed from behind onto the tracks into the path of the oncoming R train. The perpetrator was identified as 61-year-old Martial Simon. Go was pronounced dead at the scene. Simon fled the scene but later surrendered and admitted guilt.

=== Legal proceedings ===
Simon, a former taxi driver originally from Haiti, had been previously convicted of attempted robbery in 1999 and 2019 and had a warrant out for violating his parole. Shortly before the incident, he had allegedly been harassing other commuters. Another woman later told investigators that she had also been approached by Simon and that she felt threatened by him, so she walked away from him. Simon turned himself in to police shortly after the incident, and has been charged with second-degree murder.

According to the police, Simon has a history of mental illness, having been diagnosed with schizophrenia in 2002. Attorney H. Mitchell Schuman of New York County Defender Services said that, instead of understanding the complex issue of a city “[w]ith so many unhoused people with unaddressed mental illness walking the streets of our city, it would be a shame if Mr. Simon was sacrificed at the altar of vengeful public opinion instead of seeking a deeper understanding of these complex issues now facing our society." On April 19, 2022, Simon was deemed unfit to stand trial and indefinitely committed to a locked psychiatric facility. On April 30, 2024, Simon was deemed mentally fit to stand trial.

== Reaction and concern ==
Go's death received attention due to its unprovoked malice. Vigils, organized in the San Francisco Bay Area and New York City, were attended by hundreds of mourners. The case inflamed concerns over the homelessness and mental illness crises and elevated fears of soaring rates of violent hate crime, with residents calling for better security and social policies. Since the killing occurred during the rise of hate crimes against East Asians in wake of the COVID-19 pandemic, Go's parents and the press speculated about whether she was targeted due to her race, though investigators did not consider the act a hate crime. Journalists highlighted the killing of Go as an example of the lack of safety of women, particularly those belonging to minorities, experienced in the city, typically, alongside the murder of Christina Yuna Lee that occurred the same month, as both victims were women of East Asian descent killed by homeless men.

Following Go's death, the Metropolitan Transportation Authority (MTA) announced in February 2022 that it would install platform screen doors at three stations as part of a pilot program. The stations included the 7 and <7> trains' platform at Times Square, as well as the E platform at Sutphin Boulevard–Archer Avenue–JFK Airport, and Third Avenue. Even before Go's death, there had been calls to install platform screen doors at several stations, but the MTA had not done so. The pilot program at Times Square does not include the platform where Go was killed.

In May 2024, four U.S. representatives introduced the Michelle Go Act, which would allow Medicaid funds to be used to pay for stays at a wider range of psychiatric facilities.

== See also ==
- 2021 Atlanta spa shootings
- 2022 New York City Subway attack — A mass shooting that occurred three months later
- Interminority racism in the United States
- Kendra Webdale
- Killing of Vicha Ratanapakdee — Thai-American man pushed to his death in San Francisco in 2021
- Killing of Yao Pan Ma — Chinese-American man kicked to death in East Harlem in 2021
