= Stop Asian Hate =

Movement against violence targeting Asian Americans

- Part of 2020–2023 United States racial unrest and Asian American activism
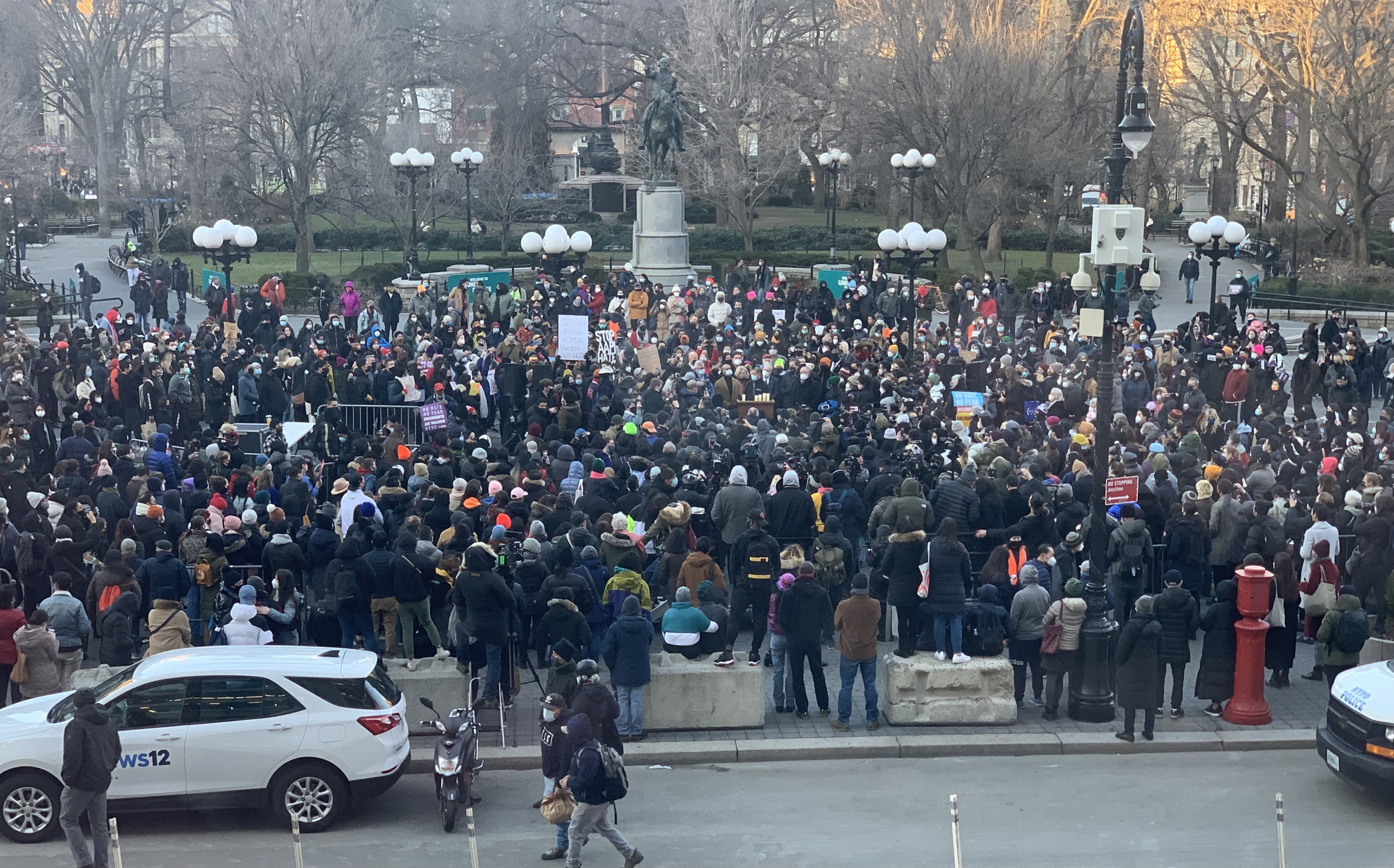
- A rally held in New York City on March 19, 2021
- Date: March 13, 2021 – 2022 (1 year, 6 months, 3 weeks and 1 day)
- Location: United States
- Caused by: Killing of Vicha Ratanapakdee; 2021 Atlanta spa shootings; Xenophobia and racism related to the COVID-19 pandemic
- Goals: End hate crimes against Asians, Asian Americans
- Methods: Protests; Vigils

Stop Asian Hate was a slogan and name of a series of demonstrations, protests, and rallies against violence targeting Asians, Asian Americans, and others of Asian descent during the COVID-19 pandemic. It began in the United States in 2021 in response to racial discrimination against Asian Americans relating to the COVID-19 pandemic.

Many rallies occurred in the wake of a series of shootings that occurred at three Atlanta spas in which eight people were killed, six of whom were women of Asian descent. However, the movement first began to gain traction after the killing of Vicha Ratanapakdee nearly two months earlier.

== Background ==
The COVID-19 pandemic, which was first reported in the city of Wuhan, in the Hubei province of China, has led to a perceived increase in racism against Asians and Asian Americans. According to the Center for the Study of Hate and Extremism at California State University, San Bernardino, and Stop AAPI Hate, there has been an increase in crimes against Asians since 2019. For instance, the Center for the Study of Hate and Extremism reported that hate crimes against Asians increased by 150% in 2020, and Stop AAPI Hate received 3,795 discriminatory incident reports in the first year of the pandemic. Research from the Center for the Study of Hate and Extremism further found that anti-Asian hate crimes rose by 339% in 2021, when compared to 2020, while police in San Francisco reported a 567% increase in anti-Asian hate crimes that year.

A Pew Research study found that 58% of Asian Americans believed that racist views had increased towards them during the pandemic. Along with this, 45% of Asian American adults say they have experienced at least one of five specific offensive incidents since the start of the COVID-19 pandemic. A study by the New York University College of Arts & Science found that there was no overall increase of Anti-Asian sentiment among the American population; instead, it suggested that "already prejudiced persons" had felt authorized by the pandemic to act openly on their prejudices. Media coverage died down when it became apparent most anti-Asian violence was being committed by black Americans.

On March 16, 2021, a mass shooting occurred at three spas in the Atlanta metropolitan area. Although the shooter has not been charged with a hate crime, a significant number of commentators have characterized it as such, as of the eight people killed, six were women of Asian descent, and the shootings also took place at businesses with a high percentage of staff members of Asian descent. According to police, the shooter said he committed those murders because of a conflict between his sex addiction and religious beliefs.

== Internal debates ==
The movement was accompanied by disagreements over policing and the portrayal of perpetrators of anti-Asian violence. A 2026 The Guardian retrospective described ideological divisions within the Asian activist community, with younger reform-minded activists favoring non-carceral, community-based interventions while older business and political leaders supported tougher law-enforcement measures. It also reported unwarranted criticism among progressive organizers that Stop Asian Hate perpetuated anti-blackness, including through the selective highlighting of black perpetrators of street violence against Asian elders. In a 2022 NPR report on the movement, Red Canary Song organizer Esther Kao said calls for increased policing were driving a "wedge" between Asian American and black and brown communities, while civil rights activist Amanda Nguyen criticized what she described as "cherry-picking the perpetrators" in coverage of anti-Asian violence.

== List of rallies ==
=== United States ===
==== Alabama ====
- Athens: Dozens gathered at Lincoln Bridgeforth Park for a rally on March 28, 2021.
- Birmingham: Over a hundred people attended a candlelight vigil at Linn Park on March 21, 2021.

==== Arizona ====
- Chandler: More than 200 people gathered for a vigil on March 21, 2021, in Chandler.
- Mesa: A large group held a march against violence on March 27, 2021.

==== Arkansas ====
- Bentonville: Several dozen attended a vigil on March 27, 2021.

==== California ====
- Berkeley: Around 1,200 people held a march in West Berkeley on March 28, 2021.
- Carlsbad: Hundreds attended a rally on March 21, 2021, in Carlsbad.
- Diamond Bar: A rally was held on March 21, 2021. During the rally, a man drove his car at a group of people crossing the street, nearly hitting them, while yelling racial slurs and "Go back to China". In May 2022, a man was indicted on federal charges in connection with the incident.
- Los Angeles: On March 27, 2021, a solidarity march was held in Koreatown.
- Pacifica: About 90 people marched from Pacifica Community Center to Rockaway Beach on April 3, 2021.
- Sacramento: About 100 were present at a rally on March 27, 2021.
- San Diego: A rally was held at the Waterfront Park on March 19, 2021. Many young students spoke there.
- San Francisco: More than 1,500 people rallied in San Francisco on March 27, 2021.
- San Jose: More than 1,000 protesters gathered at San Jose City Hall.
- San Rafael: On March 26, 2021, around 200 people held a rally at San Rafael City Plaza.

==== Colorado ====
- Denver: On March 20, 2021, more than a hundred people gathered in Little Saigon for a rally.

==== Connecticut ====
- New Haven: A rally was held on March 25, 2021, outside an Asian restaurant. Connecticut Attorney General William Tong spoke at the event.
- West Hartford: On March 19, 2021, a student-led protest with hundreds of demonstrators gathered in front of West Hartford City Hall.
- Westport: A rally was held in Westport on March 27, 2021. State Senator Tony Hwang spoke at the event.

==== District of Columbia ====
- Washington, D.C.: Hundreds rallied at McPherson Square on March 21, 2021.

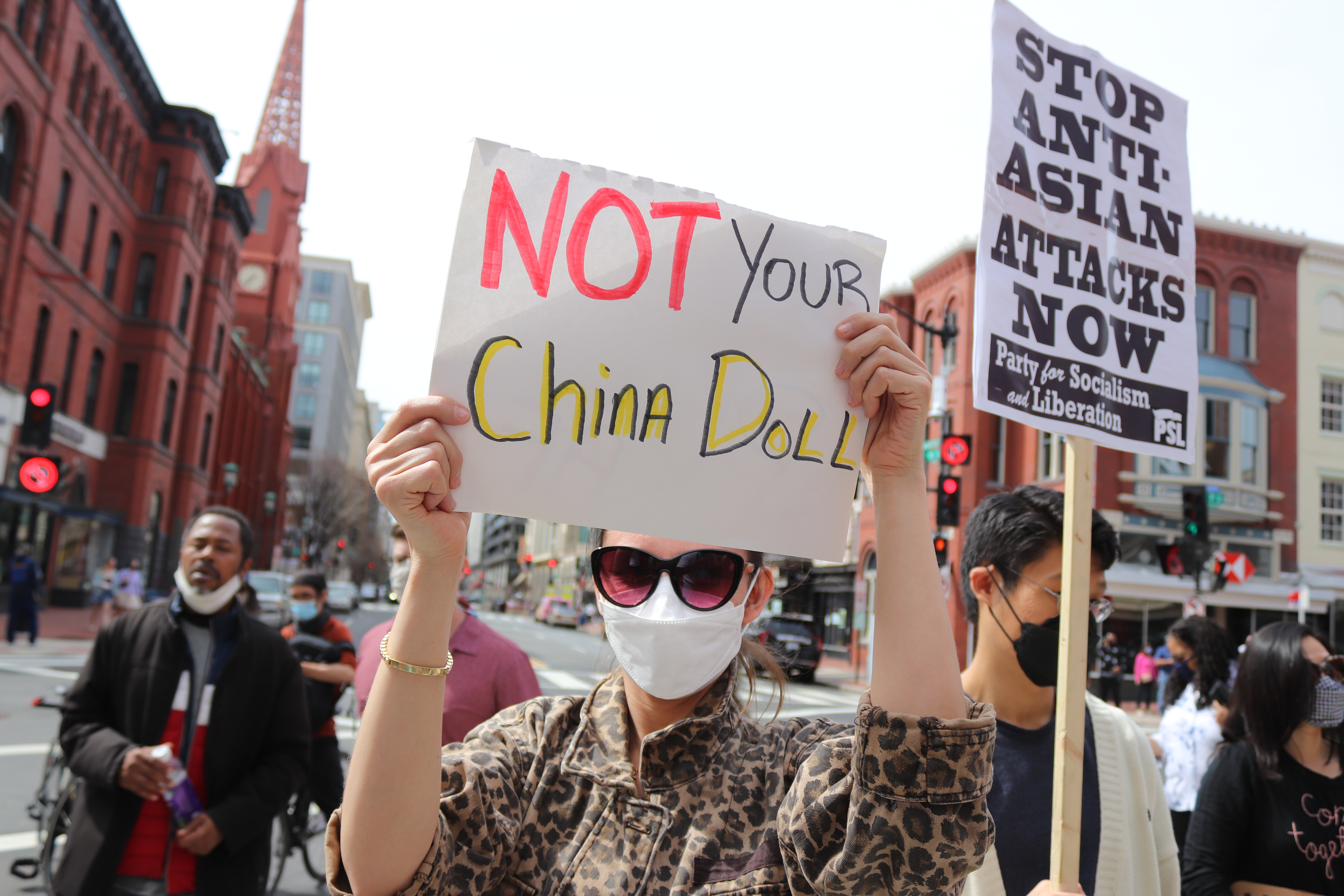
An A.N.S.W.E.R. protest in Washington, D.C. on March 27

==== Florida ====
- Gainesville: About 200 protesters gathered at Bo Diddley Park on March 27, 2021.
- Miami: A 5 kilometer run at South Beach in honor of the Atlanta shooting victims was held on March 26, 2021.
- Tallahassee: About 100 people held a rally at the Florida State Capitol.

==== Georgia ====
- Atlanta: Hundreds of demonstrators gathered outside the Georgia State Capitol in Atlanta on March 20, 2021. Atlanta had been the site of several spa shootings earlier in the week.
- Doraville: A rally was held at a parking lot in Doraville, part of the Buford Highway, on March 28, 2021.

==== Hawaii ====
- Honolulu: A Stop Asian Hate rally was held at the Hawaii State Capitol.

==== Idaho ====
- Boise: A vigil was held on March 23, 2021, at the Anne Frank Human Rights Memorial for the victims of the Atlanta shooting.

==== Illinois ====
- Chicago: Hundreds marched from Grant Park to Chicago's Chinatown on March 27, 2021.

==== Indiana ====
- Fort Wayne: About 30 people protested on March 20, 2021.
- Indianapolis: Around a hundred people gathered at Monument Circle on March 27, 2021, for a rally.

==== Iowa ====
- Iowa City: On March 28, 2021, over a hundred people held a rally in downtown Iowa City.

==== Kansas ====
- Overland Park: Dozens gathered for a rally on March 27, 2021.

==== Kentucky ====
- Lexington: Around 400 people gathered on the University of Kentucky campus on March 24, 2021, to support Asian Americans.

==== Maine ====
- Portland: About 200 marched to Portland City Hall at a demonstration on March 27, 2021.

==== Maryland ====
- Columbia: Hundreds rallied at Columbia Lakefront on March 24, 2021.

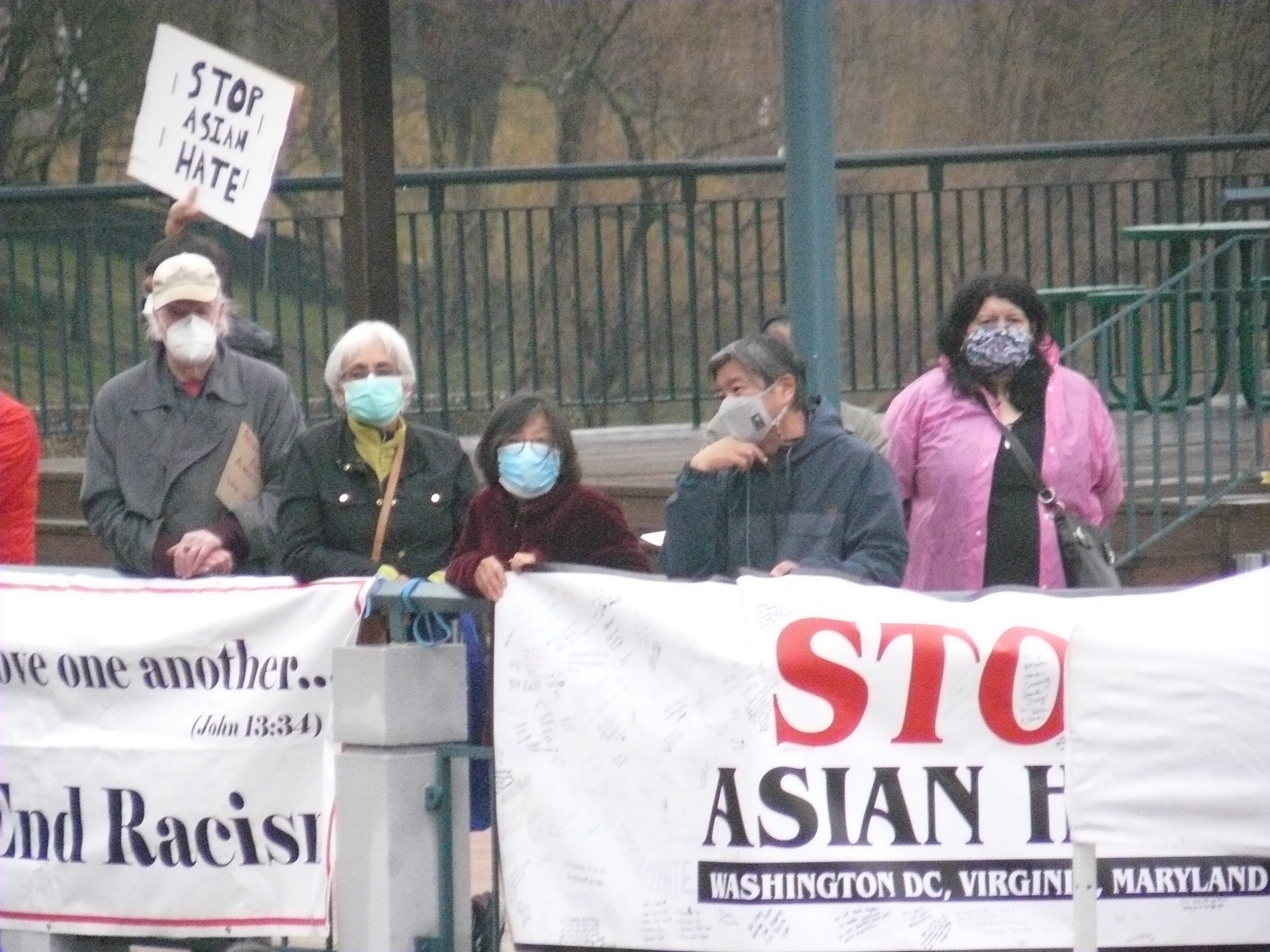
Protesters holding signs at the Columbia Lakefront in Columbia, Maryland, on March 24, 2021

- Gaithersburg: A vigil and press conference was held at the Chinese Culture and Community Center on March 21.
- Silver Spring: A march was held in support on March 26 in Silver Spring.

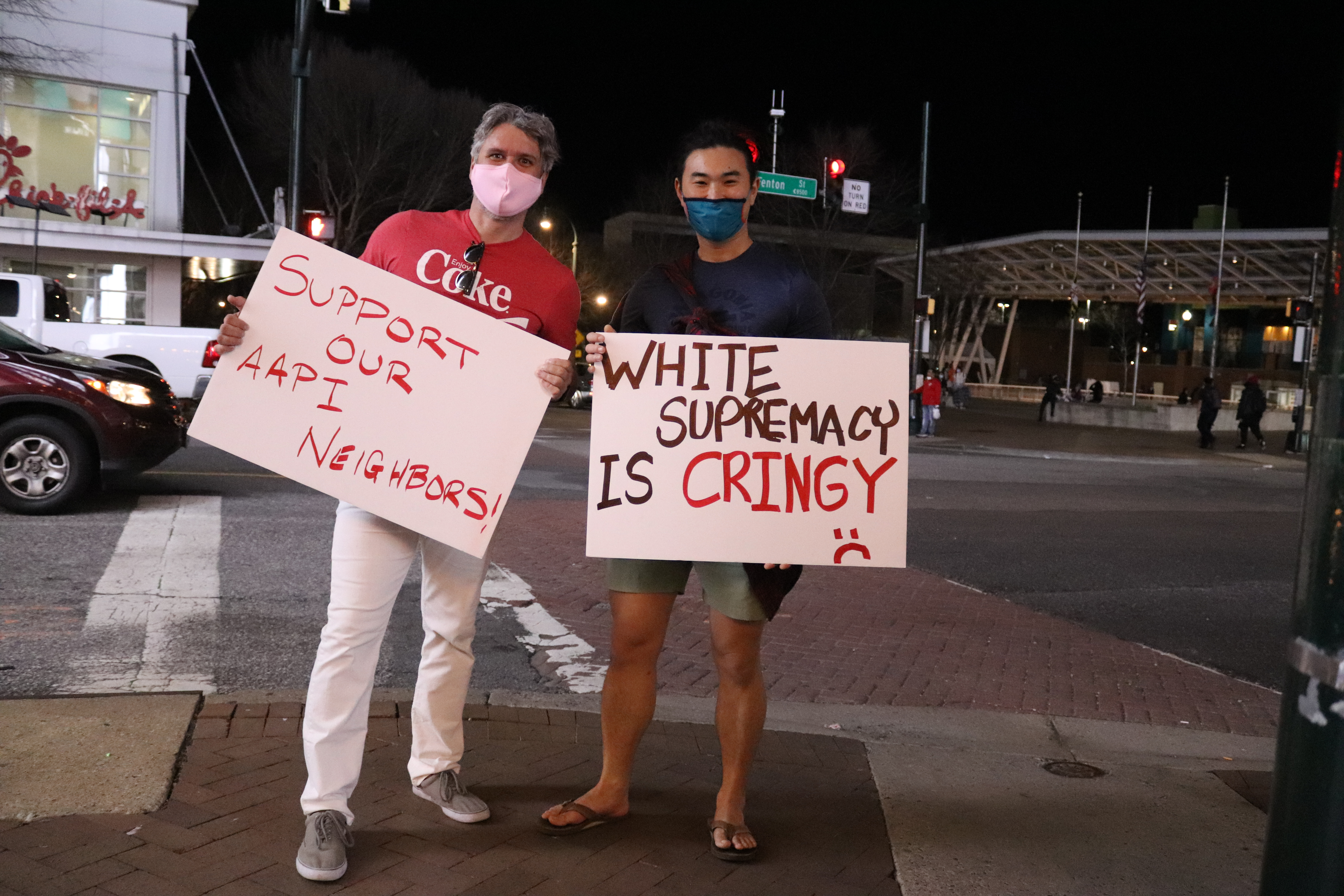
Protestors in Silver Spring, Maryland, on March 26, 2021

==== Massachusetts ====
- Boston: A rally on March 13, 2021, organized by student Ryan Doan-Nguyen was held at Boston Common and included a march through the streets of Boston's Chinatown and a subsequent conclusion at the Massachusetts State House. The rally garnered hundreds of attendees.
- Boston: A rally was held along the route of the Boston Marathon on March 27, 2021. The rally used the route that included multiple communities along a 26.2-mile course between Hopkinton, Ashland, Framingham, Natick, Wellesley, Newton, Brookline, and Boston at Boston Common.
- Lowell: A demonstration was held in the Cambodiatown neighborhood on March 17.
- Worcester: City Hall officials held a ceremony in support of the Asian-American community.

==== Michigan ====
- Detroit: Hundreds gathered at two rallies in Detroit on March 27, 2021.

==== Minnesota ====
- Saint Paul: Hundreds of people rallied at the Minnesota State Capitol on March 28, 2021.

==== Missouri ====
- Kansas City: A vigil with 100 people gathered at Mulberry Street on March 28, 2021.
- St. Louis: About 100 people gathered for a vigil on March 20, 2021.

==== Nebraska ====
- Omaha: A rally was held at Lakeside Hills Park on March 27, 2021.

==== Nevada ====
- Las Vegas/Spring Valley: A line of cars drove from the Las Vegas Strip to the Las Vegas Chinatown.
- Reno: About 50 people protested on March 27, 2021.

==== New Hampshire ====
- Concord: Hundreds including Latha Mangipudi and the mayors of Concord and Somersworth gathered at the New Hampshire State Capitol on March 21, 2021.
- Manchester: A large crowd gathered for a rally on March 21, 2021.
- Portsmouth: A crowd gathered for a rally on March 23, 2021.

==== New Jersey ====
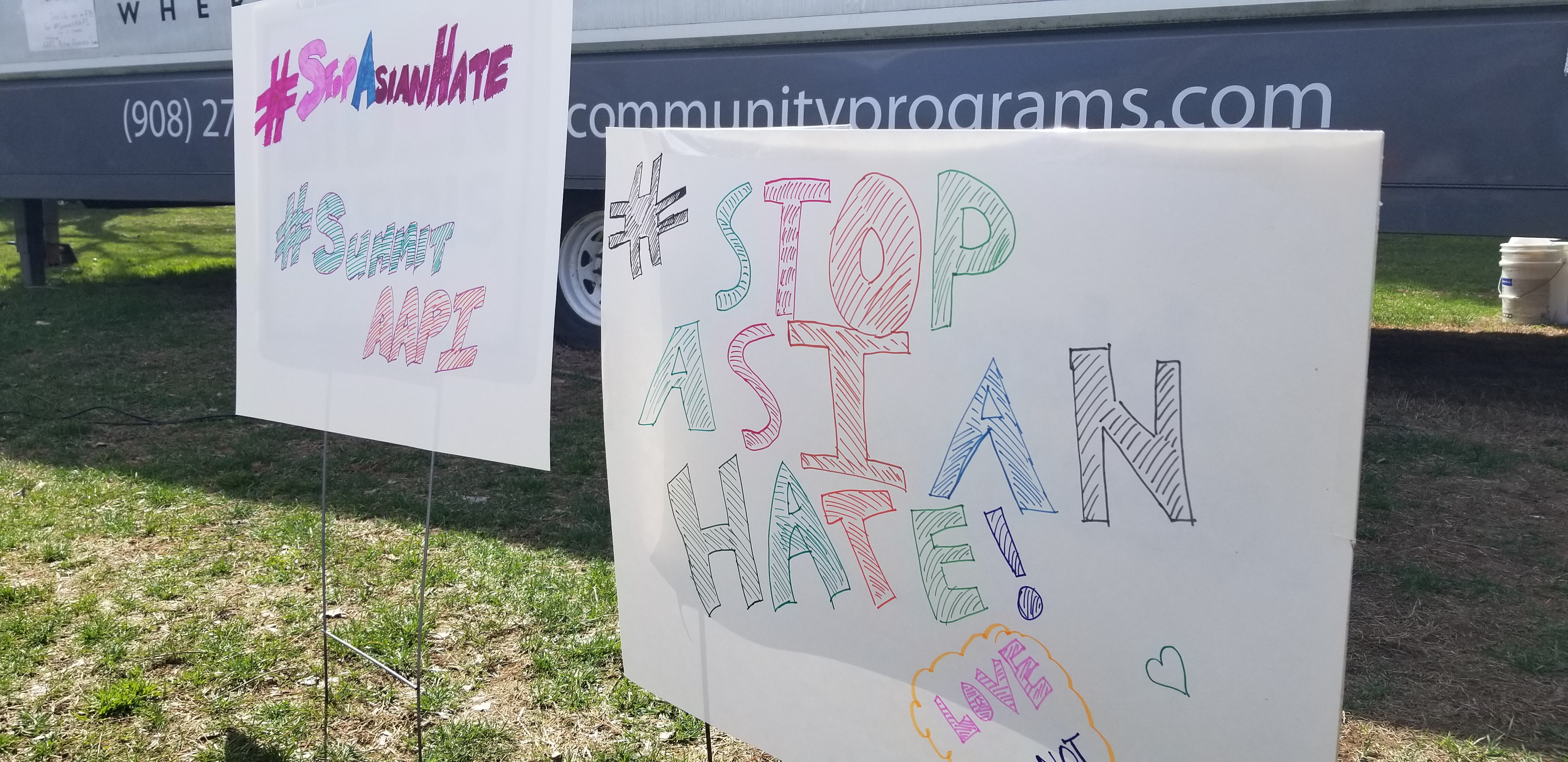
Banners in Summit, New Jersey, on March 27, 2021

- Atlantic City: About 100 protesters rallied on March 26, 2021.
- Fort Lee: Around 700 protesters gathered on March 27, 2021.
- Leonia: Over 400 people gathered for a rally and vigil on March 26, 2021.
- Millburn: About 100 people gathered for a vigil on March 21, 2021.
- Princeton: More than 500 people gathered at Hinds Plaza in Princeton on March 27, 2021.
- Summit: On March 21, 2021, more than 400 people, including the mayor and the police chief, rallied in Summit.
- Tenafly: About 800 protesters rallied on March 21, 2021.

==== New Mexico ====
- Albuquerque: About 100 people rallied in Civic Plaza on March 28, 2021.

==== New York ====
- Albany: A rally was held on March 22, 2021.
- Buffalo: Over 100 people rallied at Niagara Square on March 28, 2021.
- Hauppauge: Hundreds rallied outside the H. Lee Dennison Building in Hauppauge.
- New York City: A demonstration was held in Columbus Park, in Manhattan's Chinatown, in March.
- Scarsdale: A vigil was held on March 27, 2021.
- Syracuse: A vigil was held on March 21, 2021.

==== North Carolina ====
- Charlotte: About 100 gathered in Marshall Park on March 21, 2021, for a rally.
- Cornelius: About 60 people rallied on March 26, 2021.

==== North Dakota ====
- Fargo: Around 80 protesters marched on March 26, 2021.

==== Ohio ====
- Cincinnati: A rally was held on March 19, 2021.
- Cleveland: On March 28, 2021, a march was held to honor victims on anti-Asian violence.
- Columbus: Rallies were held in front of the Ohio State Capitol on March 20, 2021, and March 27, 2021.
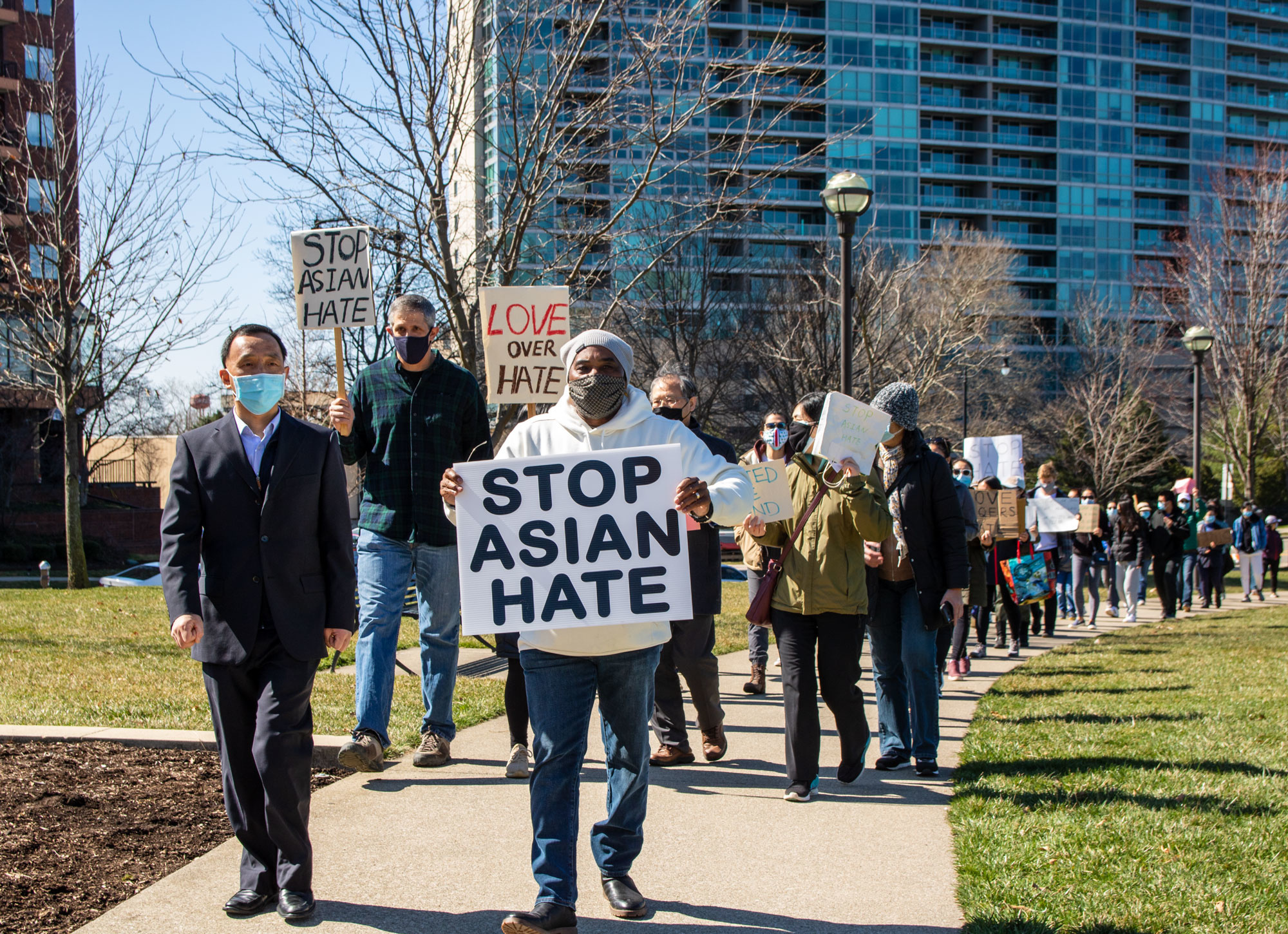
  A Columbus, Ohio, protest on March 20, 2021
- Dublin: A rally was held at Bridge Park in Dublin on March 27, 2021.
- Yellow Springs: A small group held a protest on March 27, 2021.

==== Oklahoma ====
- Oklahoma City: A vigil was held for the Atlanta shooting victims.
- Tulsa: A rally was held on March 26, 2021.

==== Oregon ====
- Portland: About 1000 people gathered for a rally on March 26, 2021.

==== Pennsylvania ====
- Lancaster: About 40 protesters gathered at Penn Square on March 27, 2021.
- Philadelphia: Hundreds rallied in Chinatown on March 28, 2021.
- Pittsburgh: More than a hundred people rallied in the Oakland region of Pittsburgh on March 24, 2021.
- State College: A small vigil was held at Penn State Old Main on March 23, 2021.

==== Rhode Island ====
- Providence: A few hundred rallied on April 3, 2021, at the Rhode Island State House.
- South Kingstown: Youth organized a rally with about 35 in attendance on April 3, 2021, in South Kingstown.

==== South Carolina ====
- Columbia: A few dozen rallied on March 27, 2021, at the South Carolina State House.

==== Tennessee ====
- Knoxville and Memphis: A small vigil was held on March 19, 2021.
- Nashville: About 100 protested in rally on March 19, 2021, at Public Square.

==== Texas ====
- Dallas: Hundreds attended a rally on March 27, 2021.
- Houston: Hundreds gathered for a vigil at Discovery Green on March 20, 2021.
- Plano: Hundreds attended a rally on March 27, 2021.
- San Antonio: A small vigil was held on March 19, 2021.

==== Utah ====
- Salt Lake City: More than 100 people attended a rally at International Peace Gardens on March 27, 2021.

==== Vermont ====
- Burlington: 30 people rallied against anti-Asian violence on March 20, 2021.

==== Virginia ====
- Newport News: A rally was held on March 27, 2021.
- Richmond: A rally held in the Short Pump area on March 23, 2021.
- Staunton: A march was held in downtown on March 27, 2021.

==== Washington ====
- Seattle: A rally was held at the Seattle Center on March 27, 2021.
- Sequim: Around 30 people gathered in downtown Sequim to support Asian Americans on March 31, 2021.
- Spokane: About 150 people attended a rally on March 20, 2021.

==== Wisconsin ====
- Madison: Several hundred people marched through downtown Madison on March 18, 2021.
- Milwaukee: On March 18, 2021, a rally was held outside Milwaukee City Hall.

=== Internationally ===
==== Canada ====
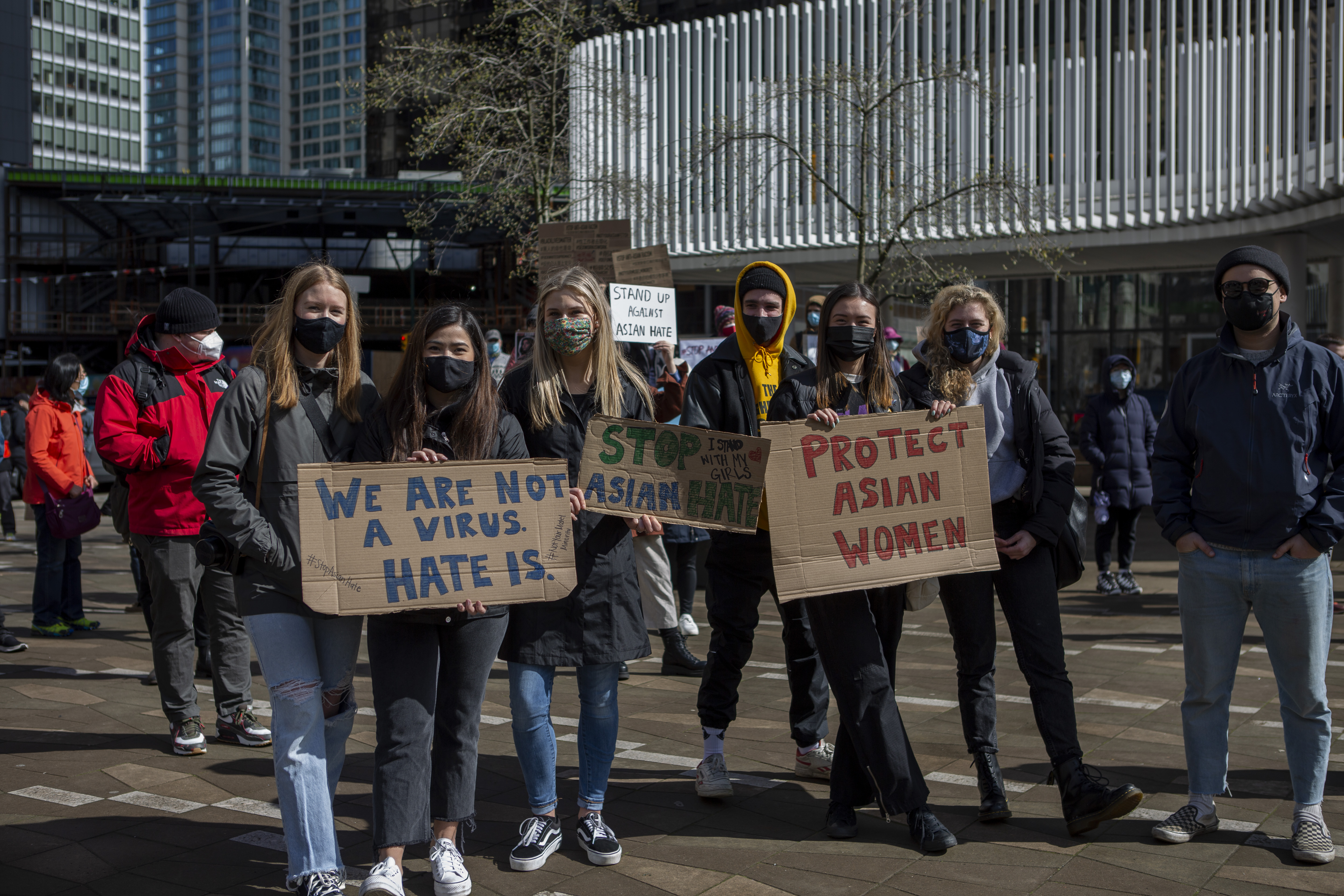
Rally in Vancouver on March 28, 2021

- Calgary: About 100 people gathered on March 28, 2021.
- Edmonton: Dozens held small protest rally on March 27, 2021.
- London, Ontario: About 100 people gathered on March 26.
- Montreal: Thousands of people marched against anti-Asian racism on March 21, 2021, ending at Sun Yat-sen Park.
- Ottawa: A small vigil was held at Minto Park.
- Richmond, British Columbia: A rally was held on May 23, 2021. During the rally a man by the name of Peter Hanssens was filmed yelling slurs and racist insults at rally-goers.
- Toronto: Thousands of people held a rally at Nathan Phillips Square on March 28.
- Vancouver: About 500 people held a rally outside Vancouver Art Gallery on March 28, 2021.
- Winnipeg: About 100 supporters rallied on March 27, 2021.

==== Netherlands ====
- Amsterdam: About 500 people gathered at Museumplein in Amsterdam to protest on April 10, 2021.

==== Taiwan ====
- Taipei: About 80 people gathered outside Taipei City Hall to protest on March 16, 2021.

== See also ==
- Stop AAPI Hate
- Antifa (United States)
- Anti-Racist Action
- Black Lives Matter
- Idle No More
- Anti-Chinese sentiment in the United States
- Anti-Filipino sentiment
- Anti-Indian sentiment
- Anti-Japanese sentiment in the United States
- Anti-Korean sentiment
- Anti-Vietnamese sentiment
- Asian American activism
- Asian immigration to the United States
- Lynching of Asian Americans
- Model minority
- Stereotypes of East Asians in the United States
- Stereotypes of South Asians in the United States
- Xenophobia and racism related to the COVID-19 pandemic
- Yellow Peril
- Chinese Exclusion Act
- History of Asian Americans
- History of opium in China
- Interminority racism in the United States
- BTS speaks out against anti-Asian hate in White House press briefing - ABC News
