= Stop AAPI Hate =

American nonprofit advocacy organization

- Formation: 2020; 6 years ago
- Founder: Manjusha P. Kulkarni; Cynthia Choi; Russell Jeung
- Location: San Francisco, California, US
- Website: stopaapihate.org

Stop AAPI Hate is an American nonprofit organization that runs the Stop AAPI Hate Reporting Center, which tracks self-reported incidents of hate and discrimination against Asian Americans and Pacific Islanders (AAPI) living in the United States, and the 501(c)(4) political advocacy organization Stop AAPI Hate Action. The organization was formed in 2020 in response to the racist attacks on the Asian American community as a result of the COVID-19 pandemic. The organization’s approach centered on four strategies:

1. Data and Research
2. Policy and Advocacy
3. Community Care
4. Strategic Communications

== History ==
Stop AAPI Hate was founded by a consortium of three groups: AAPI Equity Alliance (formerly A3PCON, the Asian Pacific Policy and Planning Council), Chinese for Affirmative Action (CAA), and the Asian American Studies Department (AAS) at the San Francisco State University, under the leadership of Manjusha P. Kulkarni, Cynthia Choi, and Russell Jeung. The consortium began its action in January 2020 as a response to the impact of the COVID-19 pandemic on Asian Americans, specifically news accounts of incidents of racially motivated violence. The group takes a grassroots approach to gathering data and providing these data to the general public and other advocacy groups.

The group began its focus on incidents occurring in California. Their researchers initially analyzed data from the end of January 2020 though the end of February 2020 from news sources reporting on xenophobia and COVID-19. The group then approached the governor of California and the state's Attorney General's Office requesting that state agencies respond to the increasing threat of discrimination. Although the governor and others in government decried the racism, they did not form a reporting center. Stop AAPI Hate subsequently formed a non-governmental community-based reporting system called the Stop AAPI Hate Reporting Center.

The group operates a website which allows users to report an incident. The website also is a clearinghouse for reports and press releases with data generated from the reporting.

On May 28, 2026, the group announced the launch of Stop AAPI Hate Action a 501(c)(4) organization dedicated to strengthening long-term AAPI political power and civic engagement, alongside the existing Stop AAPI Hate 501(c)(3) organization.

== Impact ==
On February 23, 2021, the California legislature enacted the AB 85 law which includes funding of $1.4 million specifically to support Stop AAPI Hate's website, analysis and research.

On October 7, 2023, California Governor Gavin Newsom signed Senate Bill (SB) 434 Public Transit for All: Improving Safety & Increasing Ridership into law that requires California's 10 largest transit agencies to collect voluntary survey data to better understand riders' experiences with street harassment. The bill was authored by Senator Dave Min (D-Irvine) and sponsored by Stop AAPI Hate.

Time magazine has named Kulkarni, Choi, and Jeung among the 100 most influential people of 2021, for they "have locked arms with other BIPOC organizations to find restorative justice measures so that civil rights—for all vulnerable groups—receive the protection they deserve." Manjusha P. Kulkarni received in 2025 a Carnegie Corporation of New York Great Immigrant Award.

== See also ==
- Black Lives Matter
- Idle No More
- Asian American activism
- The Asian American Foundation (TAAF)
