= Vicci Wong =

American activist (born 1951)

Victoria Wong
- Born: 1951 (age 74–75)
- Other name: Vicci Wong
- Known for: AAPA activist, coining the tern Asian American

Academic background
- Education: University of California, Berkeley

Vicci Wong, born Victoria Wong is a Chinese American activist and one of the six founding members of the Asian American Political Alliance (AAPA), which played a key role in launching the Asian American movement (AAM) in the late 1960s and coining the term Asian-American. Wong is widely recognized for her early activism in labor organizing, racial justice, and pan-Asian political organizing.

== Early life and education ==
Victoria "Vicci" Wong was born to Chinese American parents in 1951 and raised in Salinas, California, an agriculturally centered community with a dense minority population. She began her activism and had to support her family after her father was wrongfully incarcerated at the age of twelve. Growing up in a working-class community, she labored in agricultural fields and quickly became involved in the labor rights movement. Wong co-founded a local chapter of the National Farm Workers Association, an early support network for farm laborers' rights, and also helped organize a junior chapter of the Student Nonviolent Coordinating Committee (SNCC) in Monterey County. In addition, she was active in organizing anti draft protests near Fort Ord, a US Army base in the region.

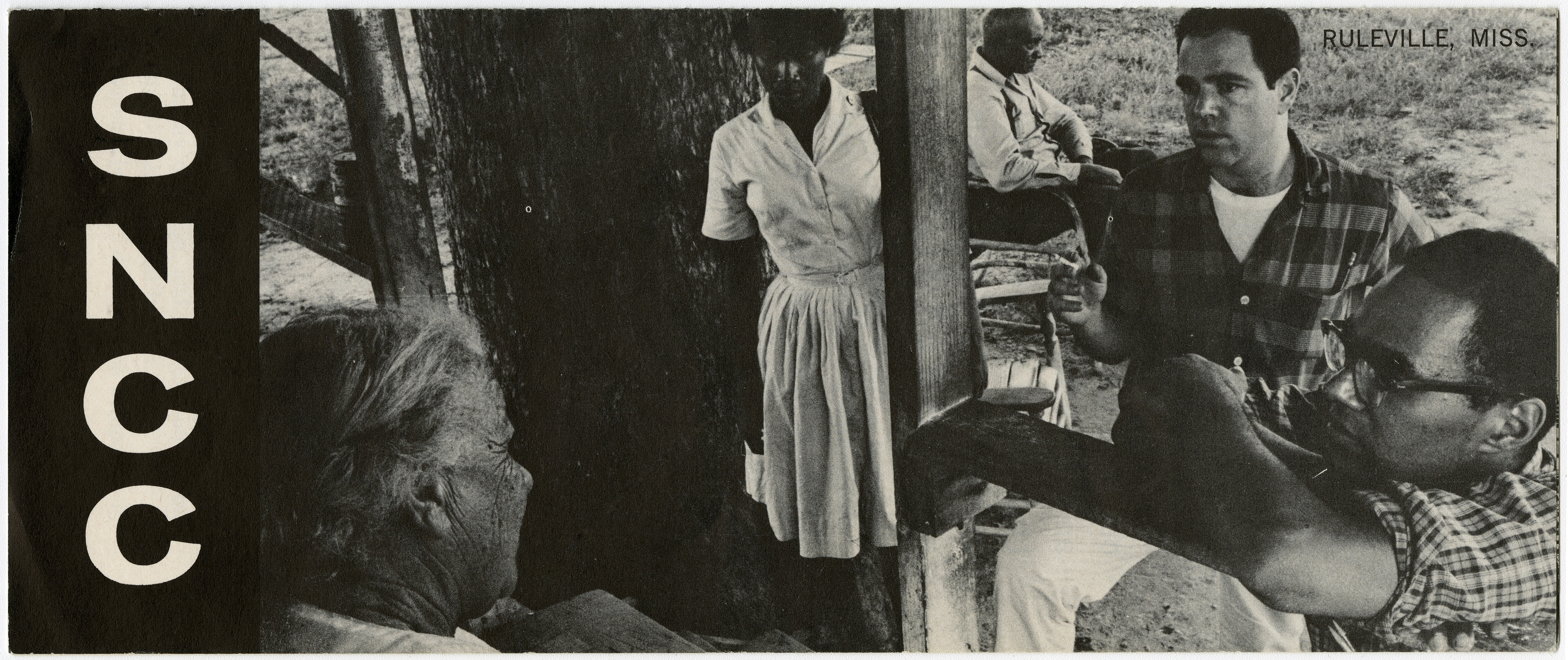
Brochure for the Student Nonviolent Coordinating Committee, 1963

In May 1968, as an undergraduate student at the University of California, Berkeley, Wong attended a pivotal Asian American activist meeting called by Yuji Ichioka and Emma Gee. Held in Berkeley, California, the gathering marked a turning point in Asian American political organizing. It brought together Japanese and Chinese Americans and quickly expanded to include Filipino and Korean Americans under a new coalition: Asian America. At a time when different Asian ethnic groups often operated in separate community spheres, this meeting laid the groundwork for pan-Asian unity against racism and imperialism.

Wong and her best friend, Lillian Fabros, were invited to the meeting by Emma Gee, who contacted them through names obtained from antiwar petitions. They began attending regular AAPA meetings at the Ichioka–Gee apartment, where they met other key figures like Floyd Huen, Jean Quan, Yuji Ichioka, and Richard Aoki. The group's commitment to coalition politics and radical activism deeply influenced Wong, who would become one of AAPA's most dynamic leaders.

Women made up an estimated 40 percent of AAPA's membership, and Vicci Wong quickly emerged as one of its leading voices. Alongside figures like Emma Gee, Penny Nakatsu, and Nikki Arai, Wong took on key leadership responsibilities from the beginning. Her fiery presence and bold advocacy earned her recognition and respect—though often through the lens of being a "strong woman" in a male-dominated movement. Male peers described her as fiery by nature, underscoring the gendered expectations women faced to assert influence within activist spaces.

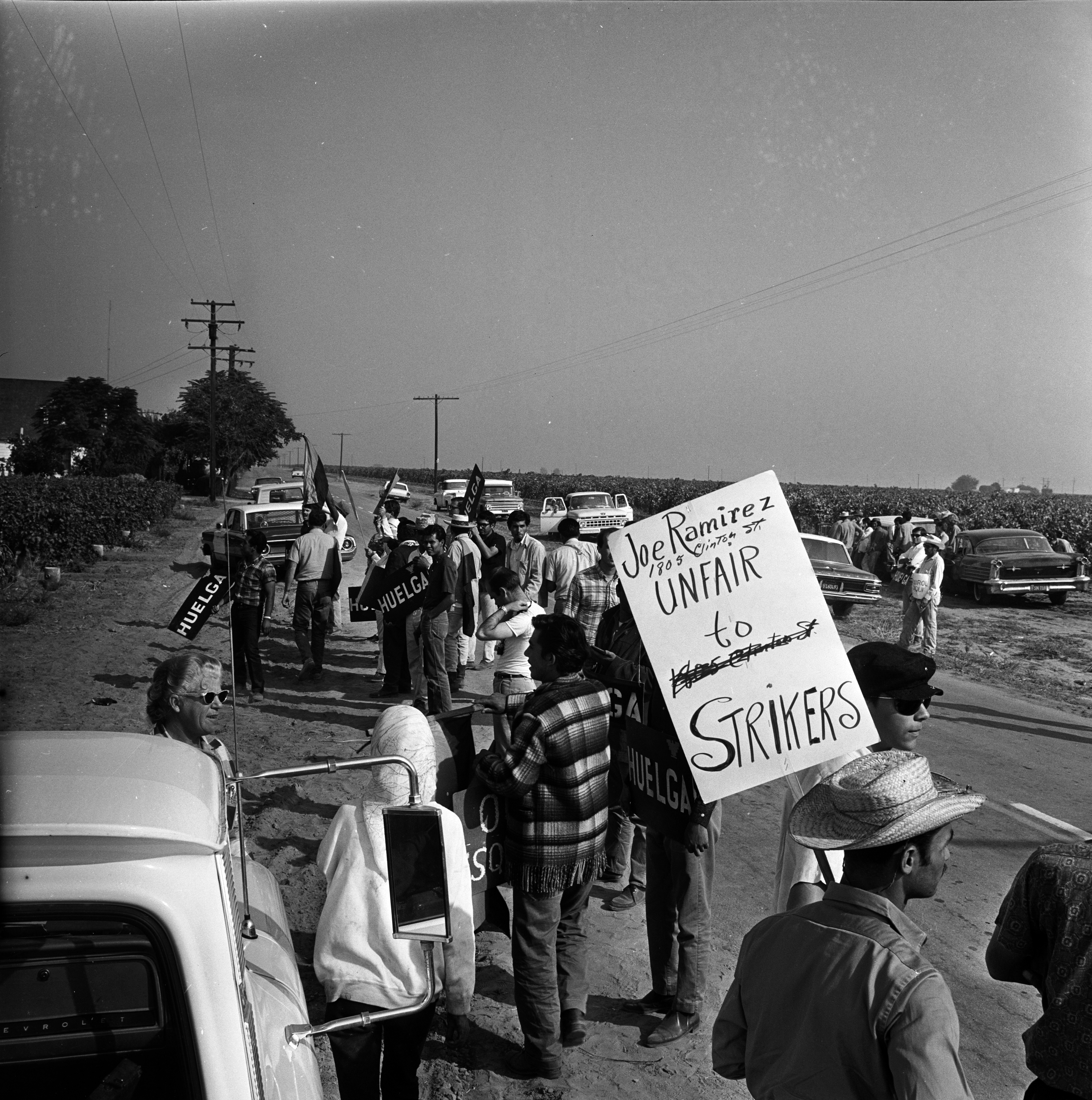
Members of the United Farm Workers on strike in Delano, California

Despite these dynamics, Wong emphasized that AAPA did not suffer from overt male chauvinism, and she remained a vocal advocate for radicalized gender analysis in the Asian American movement. Her activism also extended into broader Third World and cross-racial alliances. Alongside Fabros, Wong participated in solidarity visits to Delano, California, where they witnessed the hazardous conditions endured by Filipino and Mexican farm workers—conditions that underscored the intersection of race, class, and labor exploitation.

Wong's early activism laid a foundation not only for her own lifelong involvement in progressive causes, but also for the broader Asian American Movement. Her work exemplified the emergence of pan-Asian, feminist, and anti-imperialist organizing during a critical era of US social movements.

== Activism ==
=== Asian American Political Alliance (AAPA) ===
Wong's initial involvement in Asian American Political Alliance (AAPA) came about in May 1968 when she would be invited to its first meeting by Emma Gee and Yuji Ichioka at their apartment on Hearst Avenue, Berkeley, California. Along with Vicci Wong, three other activists were invited and the meeting would be considered AAPA's founding meeting. The formation of AAPA was significant as it led to the birth of the term Asian American, the common term to describe Asians at that time was Oriental which broadly and inaccurately described Asians as a monolithic group. "Asian American" was coined with the intent to curate a political identity that aimed to unify the diverse Asian ethnic backgrounds. Through unifying Asian Americans, it was more empowering to be united under one umbrella for activism and resistance.

AAPA's core value and emergence was marked by its time period within United States history. During the time of AAPA's creation the civil rights movement and global anti-imperialist as well as anti colonial struggle were reaching its peak. With the Vietnam War raging on, it was evident that the government was sending people of color (POC) to fight wars and spread imperialism without much care for their rights in the homeland. From its inception, AAPA swore to position itself in solidarity with groups such as the Black Panther Party and the United Farm Workers. The organization publicly denounced and criticized the US government for its involvement in Southeast Asia especially the input of Henry Kissinger, the then Secretary of State, who was a main contributor in organizing Operation Menu and several other bombing operations across Laos, Vietnam, and Cambodia. This action by Vicci Wong & AAPA aligned Asian Americans with the broader struggle of Third World Liberation movements.

=== Anti-Vietnam War ===
Along with her fellow AAPA members, fellow Wong would try to empower the Asian American community to be more politicized and participate in activism work, actively confronting racism and imperialism on a global scale. As part of their activism work, AAPA created the "AAPA Newsletters" that were published and spread throughout the campus and eventually the nation. One of their key editors and contributors would be Wong. These newsletters provided updates about the war in Vietnam and they also proved to be a useful tool to create discourse and circulate ideas within other college campuses and communities. In the political climate of that time that was divided between Black and white, AAPA's purpose was to give Asian Americans a platform for their own activism instead of being observers of the events around them. Not long after other colleges began forming their own AAPA chapters laying the groundwork for Asian American activism in the future.

Most notably, AAPA would begin to exhibit their anti-imperialism and Third World solidarity by campaigning to repeal the McCarran Internal Security Act. With the act's vague language, it allowed for emergency deportation and detention of individuals within minority groups under the guise of protecting America from communism. The act was reminiscent of the mass internment of Japanese Americans during WWII, and it served as a reminder that Asian Americans are also subjected to discrimination. To strengthen their Third World solidarity they would also begin to collaborate with the Black Panther Party and become involved with the Occupation of Alcatraz by Native Americans.

=== Montreal Conference ===
In November 1968, four AAPA members would be invited to attend the Hemispheric Conference to End the War in Vietnam including Wong, in Montreal, Canada. The event was a conference that hosted 1500 delegates from 25 different countries that was centered around U.S. imperialism and their intervention in the Vietnam War, its purpose was to build solidarity against the war in Vietnam. Alongside AAPA, was the BPP's delegate Chairman Bobby Seale whom took a prominent role within the conference to speak out against anti-imperialism as a whole instead of the conference's anti-war stance. While his radical speech was met with opposition, AAPA members stood in solidarity with their his message and it allowed Wong to realize her fight in AAM. Through attending the conference, Wong felt that for once Asian American activists were seen as players on an international stage instead of being observers, they became the subject matters who others sought to seek guidance from. This shift bolstered AAPA to become a forefront of global anti-imperialism and it allowed for international solidarity to become a center of AAPA's core beliefs, which in turn became a crucial pillar for Asian American activism.

=== Third World Liberation Front Strikes ===
Amongst the events that took place during Wong’s involvement in AAPA was her leadership in the Third World Liberation Front (TWLF) student strikes at both San Francisco State University and UC Berkeley from 1968 to 1969. The TWLF, a coalition that included the AAPA, Black Student Union, Mexican American Student Confederation, Native American Student Alliance, and others, organized what became the longest student strikes in US history.

When the Afro-American Student of UC Berkeley, demanded the creation of the Black Studies Department, the Chancellor of UC Berkeley, Haynes, rejected their proposal. As a result, in solidarity with the AASU, AAPA would join the TWLF strikes. The student-led coalitions composed of Chicanos, African Americans, Native Americans, and Asian Americans, demanded the creation of a “Third World College” that would actively reflect their experiences and history of struggle within their institutions' curricula. Among the Asian American groups were students from Taiwan, Hong Kong, and Central Valley and the four “core” groups of Asians were the Filipinos, Koreans, Japanese and Chinese. Through these protests Wong oversaw the solidarity between these student groups in the form of chants, marches, and overall commitment. Examples of solidarity included collaborations with AASU in creating chants and dances every morning. In addition, efforts by Chancellor Haynes of UC Berkeley to quell the protests included the immediate cancellation of mass rallies on campus, and anyone who partake in these rallies would be suspended from the UC. Nevertheless, Wong described how AAPA implemented the "serpentine march", which they adopted from Vietnam's guerrilla warfare tactics, to retaliate against this unjust rule. The "serpentine march" made it so that protestors would break up into smaller, adept groups to circumvent against the "mass rallies" criteria that was mentioned.

Wong's efforts during the TWLF involved recruiting members on campus and in other local communities like Chinatown. She described AAPA's form of organization as a rhizomatic leadership, with equality all throughout. As the protests raged on, the National Guard would be called and the students would face continuing pressure to stop their strike. The struggle continued through teargas and mace, where the students would wear protective garments to shield themselves from chemical weapons. The campus transformed to a battleground for freedom, where AAPA was at the forefront reflecting their courage to liberate their own communities and forge forward despite obstacles. Over time, their continued persistence garnered support from staff and faculty who took notice of their resilience and Wong saw the shift in narratives around the TWLF. On March 21, 1969 in the face of injustice, the TWLF stood their ground and they were able to succeed in making the administration bend their knee to listen to the students proposals.

The students demand originally called for the establishment of a “Third World College” program reflecting the effects of imperialism and colonization alongside the course of resistance it fueled with anti-colonialism and anti-imperialism efforts. However, institutional pushback led to the compromise term of Ethnic Studies and the demands of the strike was met. The TWLF included the creation of autonomous Ethnic Studies departments, the recruitment of more faculty and students of color, and community-relevant curriculum reform.

== Post AAPA ==
Wong's life after the founding of AAPA is still rooted in protecting her community and taking care of the Asian American community. Many members of AAPA moved from organizing on campus to organizing events, protests, strikes, and other community-building events within their own communities. As AAPA was founded in a college environment, the shift to the broader community was discovered once leaders, like Wong, recognized the different ways people contribute to helping out their community. Wong and others wanted to have a reciprocal relationship with the Asian community and middle-class workers, especially garment and restaurant workers, emphasizing the benefit of having a mutual relationship with community members.

A key part of Wong's life after AAPA was correcting the record about AAPA's origins and the Asian American involvement in social justice issues, as well as the origins of this movement. One issue she points out is the creation of Asian American Studies. In a 2018 interview as a part of the UC Berkeley Asian American Political Alliance Oral History Project', she mentions how the Asian American movement became too broad and didn't account for the nationalities coming into the United States. The movement didn't highlight the role the US government played in creating the Asian American movement and why so many Cambodian, Laotian, and Vietnamese immigrants were moving to the United States during the founding of the Asian American movement. In addition, she disagreed with the idea that AAPA was a spontaneous development without any roots or a student activist group. To her, this distortion not only disrespected the sacrifices and potentially life-ending risks early activists made, but also continues to misguide new generations of students and scholars as to what was the origins of this pivotal movement. Wong actively participates in efforts, like the UC Berkeley Asian American Political Alliance Oral History Project, and continues to give interviews. By documenting and publicizing the real history of the AAPI movement, as well as identifying archival photographs and sharing first-hand accounts of the movement's early days, Wong is ensuring to reveal the true origins of AAPA, Third World Strike, and the continued solidarity between the Asian American movement and civil rights movement in conjunction with the Black Panther Party.

The formation of AAPA marked a shift in Asian American activism, going from just Berkeley, California, to statewide and then nationwide in New York. Beyond AAPA and championing the Asian American community, she was involved in other movements and showed her support to other causes, such as the anti-war movement, peace movement, and nonviolent approaches to civil rights activism. While these were in conjunction with the formation of AAPA, she was very vocal about her causes and showed support beyond the Asian American movement. She was involved in the underground music scene in San Francisco during the 1980s and was the front person of a punk rock band, Repeat Offenders. Throughout her activism during the formation of AAPA and post AAPA, Wong leaves behind a true account of how the Asian American movement went beyond Berkeley and how the genesis of being based in Berkeley, CA, and surrounded by other activists and community members created a mutually beneficial relationship to everyone involved.

== Broader contributions and creative work ==
Outside of formal activism, Wong also expressed her politics through music. In the 1980s, she became the lead singer of the punk band Repeat Offenders in San Francisco’s underground music scene. Her participation in punk culture further reflected her resistance to mainstream norms and her ongoing commitment to artistic and political subversion. She was also known to be a singer outside the band context.

Wong's career included ongoing community organizing and cultural work that emphasized solidarity across racial and class lines. Though not always documented in mainstream sources, her continued involvement in grassroots movements helped sustain the momentum of 1960s radicalism into future decades.

== Legacy ==
Vicci Wong’s legacy is rooted in the development of Asian American identity, the founding of Ethnic Studies, and the preservation of activist history. As a founding member of the Asian American Political Alliance (AAPA), Wong helped coin the term “Asian American” to create a shared political identity that transcended national origin and united diverse Asian ethnic groups under a common cause. Her involvement in the AAPA positioned her at the center of a pivotal shift in how Asian Americans organized politically in the United States.

Following her participation in the 1968–1969 Third World Liberation Front (TWLF) student strikes at San Francisco State College and UC Berkeley, Wong continued to support anti-imperialist and civil rights causes. She participated in the Montreal Conference in November 1968, an anti-war event that mobilized activists from across the Western Hemisphere during the height of the Vietnam War. Wong also supported the broader Peace movement and took part in nonviolent civil rights activism alongside her work with AAPA.

Her political practice extended beyond campus activism. Wong emphasized reciprocal relationships between student activists and working-class Asian American communities, including garment and restaurant workers. After the founding of AAPA, many members—including Wong—shifted their focus toward community-based organizing, continuing the work of coalition-building in local contexts. Wong lived in the AAPA house, a communal living space that reflected the group’s values of mutual support and sustained political engagement beyond the university setting.

Wong has been an outspoken critic of historical revisionism surrounding the Asian American movement. She rejected depictions of AAPA as a spontaneous or apolitical development, arguing that such narratives disregard the intentionality and risk involved in the group’s formation. In a 2018 interview for the UC Berkeley Asian American Political Alliance Oral History Project, Wong expressed concern that the broadening of the Asian American label over time had obscured the historical role of U.S. imperialism in shaping refugee migration from Cambodia, Laos, and Vietnam. She emphasized that understanding these political origins is crucial to grasping the full scope of Asian American activism. Through oral history interviews, archival identification, and public speaking, Wong has contributed to preserving the early history of AAPA and the Asian American movement. Her work has underscored the movement’s deep connections to the Black Panther Party and broader Third World solidarity networks. Scholars such as Diane C. Fujino have noted Wong’s significance in helping reframe the origins of Asian American Studies as rooted in radical political action and multiracial alliances. Outside of political organizing, Wong was active in the underground music scene in San Francisco during the 1980s. She was the lead singer of the punk rock band Repeat Offenders and continued to identify as a singer throughout her life. Her participation in punk music reflected her ongoing resistance to mainstream cultural norms and her belief in creative expression as a form of political engagement.

As the daughter of Chinese immigrants, Wong's life embodies the intersections of migration, community-based activism, and cultural resistance. Her legacy continues through her contributions to the documentation of activist history, the language of Asian American identity, and the institutionalization of Ethnic Studies.
