= Emma Gee =

Chinese American activist and writer

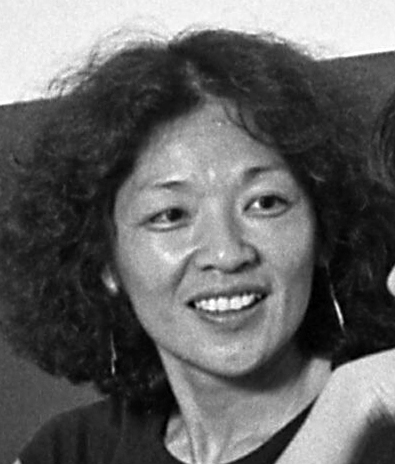
- Gee in 1980
- Born: 1939
- Died: April 15, 2023 (aged 83–84)
- Education: Columbia University University of California, Berkeley - M.A.
- Occupations: Scholar, Activist, Lecturer, Writer
- Known for: Co-originator of the term Asian American; Co-founder of the Asian American Political Alliance
- Spouse: Yuji Ichioka

Emma Gee (1939 – April 15, 2023) was an American activist, scholar and writer, best known for helping to coin the term "Asian American" and co-founding the Asian American Political Alliance (AAPA) with her husband, Yuji Ichioka.

After establishing the first-ever AAPA chapter in Berkeley, California, Gee was influential in guiding the organization through social advocacy, notably by supporting the Third World Liberation Strikes of 1968 and helping to extend AAPA beyond the San Francisco Bay Area. Gee is widely credited with collaborating with fellow AAPA activists, including Vicci Wong, Lilian Fabros, and Penny Nakatsu, to ensure that women activists held leadership roles as part of the organization's broader goal of inclusivity.

Gee later entered academia as a lecturer at UC Berkeley and UCLA, where she taught some of the first Asian American studies courses at both institutions, including the first-ever course focused on Asian women. She is also known for her writing efforts, notably editing and contributing to Asian Women (1971) and Counterpoint: Perspectives on Asian America (1976), the latter in collaboration with the Pacific Asian American Women Writers West (PAAWWW).

== Personal life ==
By 1963, Gee was a student at Columbia University where she met Yuji Ichioka, a graduate student pursuing a master's degree in Chinese history. Gee would later recall that the two of them first met at a shared lecture, where she referred to him as a “good-looking guy” who “had this look of disdain” as a renowned professor was delivering a lecture in a full hall. She replied that she decided on the spot, “I’ve got to meet this guy.”

Citing dissatisfaction with Columbia's academic program, Emma Gee and Ichioka relocated to the University of California, Berkeley, where they completed their graduate studies. Gee and Ichioka's date of marriage is unclear from public records, but from Ichioka's 2002 eulogy in the Los Angeles Times, it was reported that the couple had been married for over 25 years, indicating they wed by the late 1970s.

According to colleagues, Gee was “a powerhouse in her own right” and made significant contributions to scholarship and activism. they also credited her with having a significant impact on issues affecting women, immigrants, workers, communities of color, and the broader public.

== Activism ==
=== Originating the term "Asian American" ===
While completing their PhD programs at the University of California, Berkeley in May 1968, Gee and Ichioka established the Asian American Political Alliance (AAPA) in Berkeley, California. Upon the founding of AAPA, the two formulated the term "Asian American," resulting in its first known written use. Gee and Ichioka would later specify that the term "Asian American" and AAPA itself were intended to provide cohesion and consolidation between "'all of us Americans of Asian descent'" during the intersectional civil rights movements of the 1960s, not dissimilar from the origin of the terms African-American or Latin American. The term Asian American replaced the previously used term "Oriental," which had a discriminatory history as a derogatory and archaic label often used to denigrate immigrants and ethnic-descendants of the eastern hemisphere in contrast to the western hemisphere (particularly western Europe and the United States) with the term "Occidental." A common consensus which emerged around the new term was its emphasis on marginalized Asian-descent communities' shared histories and identities through labor and social integration struggles as "Americans," and not as perceived "foreigners," an umbrella label bearing ample stigma.

=== Role in the emergence of AAPA ===
The Asian American Political Alliance is credited as one of the earliest recorded Asian American pan-ethnic alliances, bringing together Chinese, Korean, Japanese, and Filipino American students among others. While developing its structure and logistics, Gee and Ichioka drew influence from simultaneous social movements including the anti-Vietnam War movement, the UFW unionization, the Black Power Movement, and the American Indian Movement.

Prior to AAPA's formation, Gee and Ichioka had circulated petitions to support the Peace and Freedom Party (PFP) in 1967 as part of the anti-Vietnam War student movements across the nation. However, the couple had observed that many PFP student activists of Asian descent were participating on an individual basis, and not as a collective front, in contrast to other ethnic coalitions such as the Black Panther Party (BPP) which were experiencing higher volumes of visibility. Seeing an opening to establish their own PFP-aligned caucus due to their shared feelings of marginalization from both leadership and participation in simultaneous social movements (such as the Free Huey protests in the summer of 1968 with the BPP), Gee and Ichioka presented AAPA as the consolidated front of Asian American mobilization which they felt deprived of in the PFP.

Gee and Ichioka's triplex apartment at 2005 Hearst Avenue residence in Berkeley was the site of the first AAPA meeting in May 1968, which contained six credited founding members in attendance. In addition to Gee and Ichioka, there was Richard Aoki, a militant activist with the BPP and a fellow graduate colleague of Ichioka's; Floyd Huen, president of the Chinese Student Club at UC Berkeley; Victor Ichioka, Yuji Ichioka's younger brother; and Vicci Wong, a UC Berkeley undergraduate organizer with the SNCC and UFW in Salinas. Wong would later recall that some of AAPA's early participants and members, including herself, were individually contacted by Gee and Ichioka based on their traditionally-Asian surnames from local student rosters at UC Berkeley and San Francisco State University (SF State, formerly San Francisco State College), as well as PFP petitions which had been circulated by the pair.

AAPA's early foundations under its six founding members included expanding its operations into San Francisco, with AAPA establishing resource centers such as the Chinese Draft Counseling Center in the city's Chinatown neighborhood, which provided Chinese-language materials for resisting the army draft during the Vietnam War. AAPA's second notable chapter formed at SF State in September 1968 from the work of Penny Nakatsu and Masayo Suzuki, the former of whom was present at the Gee-Ichioka residence soon after the early meetings to observe the potential of the organization, and who took considerable influence from Gee. As 1969 approached, AAPA chapters began spreading to Mills College, UC Santa Cruz, UC Davis, and even as far as the University of Southern California, Columbia University, Dartmouth College, and the University of British Columbia.

After the formation of AAPA, Gee, alongside fellow members including Wong and Nakatsu, took on prominent leading roles as liaisons between chapters and community connections; it is estimated that women made up nearly forty percent of AAPA's early membership, a notable difference compared to other social organizations of the time. In addition, many male members additionally viewed Gee and her peers as "strong women," even though questions were raised about the gendered dynamics conveyed in such a distinction that would distinguish women in AAPA from male members. A key example of these gendered double-standards that Gee in particular faced in AAPA's early months came from perceptions of her role in the group by one of her fellow founders, Richard Aoki. Aoki reportedly saw Gee as a "gracious host," but did not directly acknowledge her role alongside Ichioka as a co-founder of the group who had known and worked with Ichioka, Aoki's friend and fellow graduate student, earlier than Aoki himself had.

When Gee and Ichioka relocated to New York in August 1968, Wong took over a large part of the Berkeley AAPA chapter operations in place of the couple. AAPA's reach at this point had grown far beyond the initial chapter in Berkeley under Gee and Ichioka, with Wong receiving calls and communications from scholars and community members across the United States and even from the Asian continent itself, and even receiving a visit from a Dartmouth professor who co-opted the AAPA program into a chapter back in Hanover, New Hampshire.

=== Influence on the Asian American Movement (AAM) ===
As AAPA gained ground, the founding members including Gee played critical roles in helping kickstart the Third World Liberation Front (TWLF), which was a significant catalyst behind the 1968-1969 Third World Strikes at SFSU and later UC Berkeley that ultimately succeeded in establishing the first ever Ethnic Studies and Asian Studies centers at an American public university. The TWLF coalition consisted of a collaboration between AAPA (its founding Berkeley chapter as well as the second chapter started at SFSU), the Philippine American Collegiate Endeavor (PACE), the Intercollegiate Chinese for Social Action, and Black, Latinx, and Native American student unions. After the success of the strikes, the Berkeley AAPA chapter began to struggle with membership retention, and sought to redirect their efforts towards strengthening Asian American Studies (AAS) and community project works, with the San Francisco chapter following suit. Without the TWLF and the strikes as a guiding motive and with changes in AAPA leadership, the organization's campus chapters across the United States declined in scale by 1970.

AAPA, while short-lived as an organization, caused the emergence of the Asian-American Movement (AAM) by the fall of 1968. Gee had relocated to New York by the end of the summer of 1968 before the AAPA foundations grew into the AAM, but her influence on the latter movement remained apparent after AAPA's 1970 disbanding. Gee and Ichioka's initial usage of the term "Asian American" was to combat racism and imperialism facing communities of Asian descent living in the United States by proliferating an umbrella term to connect a diverse array of individuals and diasporas. After AAPA and as the later twentieth century ensued, the term became used more as a racial categorization than as a political coalition term that it was originally perceived as. However, within discourses related to social movements, the term "Asian American" has maintained its connection to civil rights and grassroots activism, in a similar sense to Gee and Ichioka's original term definition.

Gee's domestic partnership and later marriage to Ichioka was seen by many as an example of an barrier-breaking pan-Asian union pushing against traditional segregation of Asian ethnic groups, with Gee being of Chinese descent and Ichioka of Japanese descent. As the couple recruited for AAPA, their relationship to each other and later other initial AAPA participants including Lilian Fabros (of Filipino descent), Vicci Wong (of Chinese descent), and Richard Aoki (of Japanese descent) further emphasized the initial AAPA goal of pan-Asian ethnic unity, particularly with Gee and Ichioka's emphasis on inclusive recruitment methods.

== Editorial and educational work ==
Gee was a consistent advocate of Asian American literature, particularly through her editorial and writing efforts in the field of education. She played a key role in editing the academic compilation, Asian Women (1971) and the book Counterpoint: Perspectives on Asian America (1976). In addition to her editorial work, Gee also engaged in translation work, notably publishing a translation of Poems of Angel Island in the Amerasia Journal. Beyond her publications, she also taught at UC Berkeley.

=== Asian Women (1971) ===
In the winter of 1971, UC Berkeley offered the first Asian American women's course ever – a proseminar titled Asian Studies 170. Confronted with issues of sexism and lack of representation in the "white middle-class women's liberation movement," members of this course sought to create a venue for their experiences and perspectives. The result was an extensive collection of personal narratives about identity, published in Asian Women (1971).

The book was organized into several sections: an introduction, Part I: Herstory, Part II: Reflections, Part III: Third World Woman, Part IV: Politics of Womanhood, and a bibliography and acknowledgements. Gee not only contributed to this collection as an editor but also as a writer. Under Part I: Herstory, Gee authored a piece titled "Issei: The First Women," which was later reprinted as "Issei Women". This work was Gee's personal exploration of what Lowell Chun-Hoon described in a review as "the agonies of Issei womanhood".

Gee highlighted the harsh conditions faced by new immigrants. She noted how mothers were often only given three days of postnatal rest before returning to fieldwork, and how many women had to serve as their own midwives. She also examined the harmful stereotypes Issei women endured in American society and the cultural dissonance between their countries of origin and the United States. For example, while many Americans interpreted silence as weakness, for Issei women, Gee claimed quietness and modesty were expressions of strength.

The book was reviewed shortly after its publication by Lowell Chun-Hoon in the Amerasia Journal. Chun-Hoon wrote, "While Asian Women lacks a uniform intellectual consistency of depth and detail, it possesses a candor and emotional sincerity that make it an invaluable addition to the literature of Asian American expression". Though some readers may not have found the collection intellectually rigorous, it was widely recognized as a vital anthology of Asian American women's perspectives and experiences, contributing emotional resonance and diversity to Asian American literature. Chun-Hoon also praised editors Gee and Jeanne Quan for the anthology's "...clean and unpretentious style of writing".

=== Counterpoint: Perspectives on Asian America (1976) ===
Following the example of African Americans, Asian Americans in the 1960s began reflecting on their experiences in the United States in an effort to reaffirm their ethnic identity. Counterpoint: Perspectives on Asian America (1976) was an anthology published by the UCLA Asian American Studies Center that described how Japanese, Korean, Indian, and Chinese immigrant communities fought in the United States in leftist and nationalist. The authors focused on the emergence of specific Asian immigrant politics in the United States based on the international affairs in the home countries of the immigrants and the profound discrimination Asian immigrants were experiencing in their everyday lives in the United States during the time of Asian exclusion. This anthology served as one of the first textbooks in Asian American studies and remains a foundational work in the field.

The book opens with a preface and is divided into three parts: Critical perspectives, Contemporary issues, and Literature. Part I, Critical Perspectives, includes bibliographical essays and book reviews that critiqued traditional analyses of past works while suggesting new directions for future studies. Part II, Contemporary Issues, addresses the major concerns of the Asian American community during the 1960s and 1970s, including topics such as immigration, education, media, and various other pertinent social issues. Finally Part III, Literature, explores the creative output of Asian American writers, highlighting how their work conveyed the social realities of Asian America. The book concludes with two appendices; one providing statistical highlights from the 1970s census and the other bibliographical sources.

Compiled by Asian American writers, Counterpoint examines key issues from the perspective of various Asian American communities, each with its own distinct experience of identity in the United States. Gee played multiple roles in the creation of this book, including editing, writing the preface, contributing her earlier piece "Issei Women" (included under Part II: Land, Labor, and Capital), and authoring the introduction to the section on recent immigration and critical perspectives.

In the preface and introductions, Gee contextualized the rise of the field of Asian American studies amid the political and social upheavals of the 1960s and 1970s. She argued that the Civil Rights movement, anti-war protests, and growing ethnic consciousness across racial and cultural groups revealed deep contradictions in the American narrative of democracy. Gee personally emphasized that all academic inquiries begin with questions that carry embedded assumptions. Drawing on the work of Susanne K. Langer, Gee argued that the way questions are formulated defines the framework within which facts are interpreted, thereby influencing which answers are considered valid. Her work in the preface and introduction of the anthology helped present Asian Americans as active historical agents rather than passive subjects. Gee highlighted what she saw as the biased lens in which Asian Americans had historically been studied, and advocated for a critical reassessment of Asian American history and experience.

Gee's writing throughout the book also acknowledged the collaborative nature of the work, thanking community members, contributors, and staff at the UCLA Asian American Studies Center for their support. The anthology was both a product and reflection of a broader movement to reclaim and redefine Asian American identity through storytelling and scholarship, something Gee dedicated her life to with her translations, editing, and writing.

In a review of Counterpoint, architect and historian Philip P. Choy wrote, "It is evident by the selection of essays that the Asian American experience is diverse and vibrant with life, in contrast to the common depiction of Asians as continually licking their wounds of rejection and totally preoccupied with the problems of assimilation."

=== Poems of Angel Island (1982) ===
Alongside her editorial work, Gee also pursued translation. In 1982, following the year Gee spent in Japan and China studying the changing lives of women, her translation of the Poems of Angel Island was published in the Amerasia Journal. Established in 1971, Amerasia Journal is a leading publication in Asian American studies, and Gee served on its advisory board.

The Poems of Angel Island refer to writings carved into the wooden walls of the Chinese barracks at Angel Island, located in the San Francisco Bay Area. From 1910 to 1940, Angel Island functioned as an immigration detention station for people entering or reentering the United States from the Pacific Coast, or those awaiting deportation. While detained, Cantonese immigrants– held in racially segregated quarters– inscribed poems into the barracks' walls, most of which were left unsigned.

Originally written in Chinese, many of these poems were translated into English by Gee, making them accessible to a wider audience. The verses express the fear, disillusionment, and isolation felt by detainees, capturing the emotional toll of the immigration experience. Gee's work on this project reflected her ongoing intersectional interests in immigration, gender, and Asian American literature.

=== Pacific Asian American Women Writers West (PAAWWW) ===
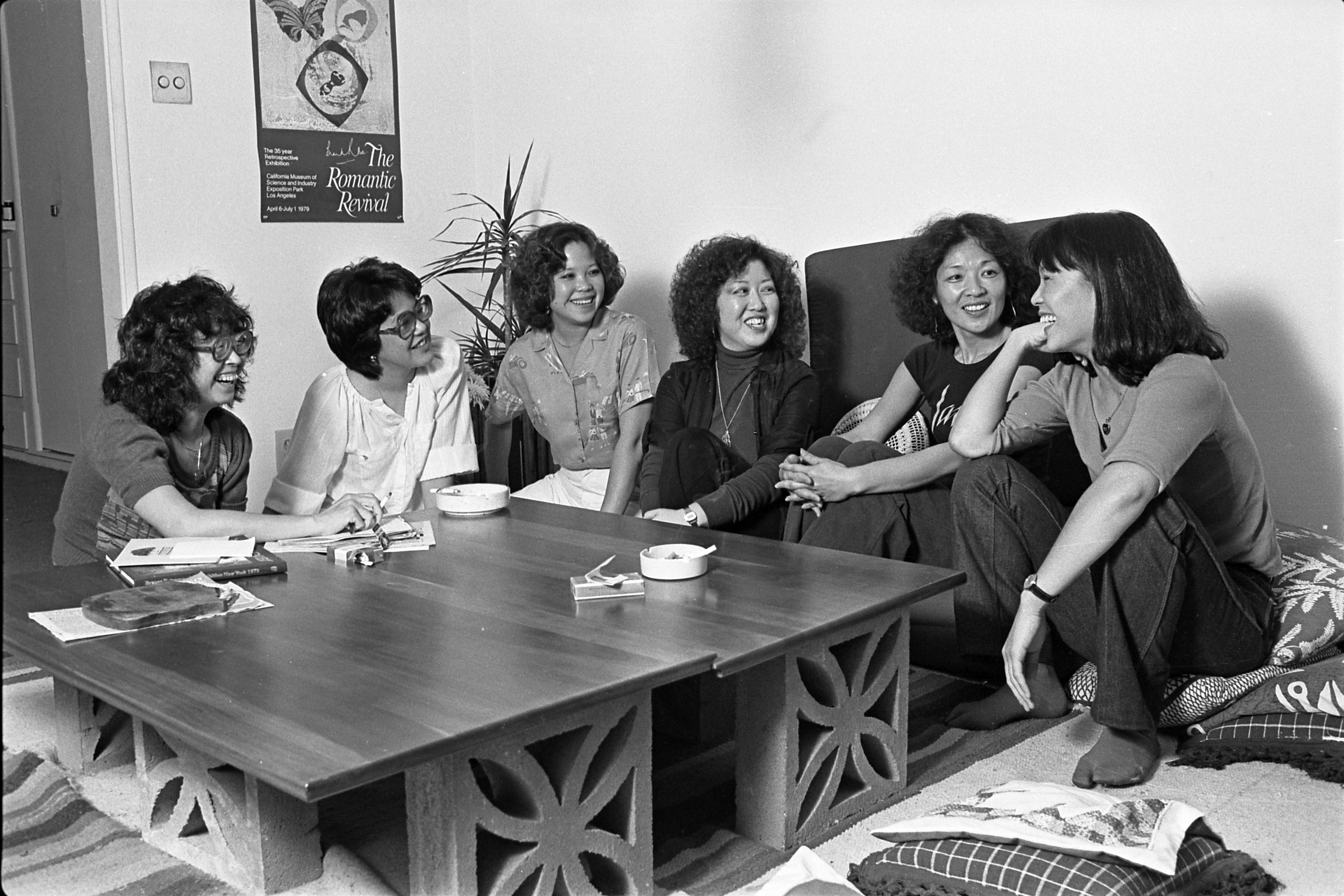
Gee, second from right, alongside five other members of the Pacific Asian American Women Writers' West (PAAWWW) at a general meeting in July 1980. Photo by Gary Friedman for the Los Angeles Times.

Throughout her life, Gee was deeply involved in promoting and nurturing Asian American literature and writing. In addition to her engagement with pan-Asian issues through the Asian American Political Alliance (AAPA), she played a critical role in advancing the presence of Asian Americans in the literary field. During the 1970s and 1980s, collectives of female writers and artists began to organize cultural and literary groups. One of these groups was the Pacific Asian American Women Writers West, which is also known as PAAWWW (pronounced "pow"), or PAAWW–West, which was founded in 1978. Gee was among the earliest members of this collective, and would later become a chair on the PAAWWW board of directors. Gee, and PAAWWW as a collective, aimed to foster the artistic development of women writers of color and to preserve and promote Pacific Asian American literature, history, and art.

What began as informal gatherings quickly solidified into a collective that, by 1980, included notable members such as Momoko Iko, Joyce Nako, Karen Saito, Miya Iwataki, Diane Takei, and Gee herself. The women in PAAWWW not only sought a platform for their own voices, but also aimed to reshape the portrayal of Pacific Asian Americans in mainstream media. Gee, already a major advocate for Asian American writing–as evident by her prior editorial work– encouraged her fellow writers to share their poetry and prose with their communities. Readings and presentations began at the Amerasia Bookstore, and the legacy of Gee's vision has continued today, with PAAWWW members still being invited to panels and literary events. Furthermore, Gee used her position in PAAWWW to collaborate with other Asian American writing collectives like the Amerasia Journal, on which she was a member of the advisory board.

Beyond her literary advocacy, Gee was active in supporting other marginalized communities. Her specific passion for uplifting writers of color remained central to her, as demonstrated by her participation in PAAWWW readings alongside celebrated female poets like Wanda Coleman.

== Later work and honors ==
Gee and her husband, Yuji Ichioka, carried on their efforts to increase Asian American representation in higher education after the Asian American Political Alliance was disbanded in 1969. The Asian American Studies Center, one of the first academic institutions in the US devoted to the study of Asian American experiences, was founded at UCLA thanks in part to their leadership.

In 2004, UCLA's Asian American Studies Center established the "Yuji Ichioka and Emma Gee Endowment for Social Justice and Immigration Studies" to honor Ichioka and Gee's contributions to the advancement of Asian Americans. The endowment supports research-related activities that celebrate their contributions. One of the first recipients of support from the endowment was Grace Lee Boggs, a Chinese American author, social activist, philosopher, and feminist, whom Gee met early in the 1963 March on Washington. The endowment also provided key support for a student- and community-based forum regarding the 30th anniversary of the freeing of Chol Soo Lee, a Korean American immigrant who was wrongfully convicted of murder.

In 2014, Gee came to a UCLA celebration of the completion of this fund, in which she was honored as one of the veterans of the center with decades of faithful service for the completion of the Yuji Ichioka and Emma Gee Endowment in Social Justice and Immigration Studies with a celebration May 17 at Senshin Buddhist Temple in Los Angeles.

In 2018, to commemorate the fiftieth anniversary of the formation of AAPA in May 1968, the Berkeley Historical Plaque Project designated the former residence of Emma Gee and Yuji Ichioka at 2005 Hearst Avenue—a site that had served as AAPA's headquarters—as a city historical landmark. Gee was not personally in attendance, but fellow AAPA co-founders Vicci Wong and Floyd Huen—along with his wife, former Oakland mayor Jean Quan, who became involved in AAPA shortly after its formation—were among the roughly three dozen attendees at the dedication. They paid tribute to Gee's role in energizing the group from its very first meeting and beyond. An online digital version of the plaque credits Gee by name, alongside the other five original AAPA members from the historic founding meeting in May 1968, describing the event as an "iconic evening."

In 2020, the four ethnic studies centers, American Indian Studies Center, Asian American Studies Center, Bunche Center for African American Studies, and Chicano Studies Research Center, by themselves forming the institute of UCLA, were celebrating their 50th anniversary.

The same year she was mentioned in TIME magazine because she contributed to the creation of the term "Asian American" in 1968.

Gee died on April 15, 2023, at the age of 84.

== Impact ==
=== Model Minority Myth ===
As the term "Asian American" was being created by Gee and Yuji Ichioka, simultaneously, the concept of there being a "model minority" among American people of color was gaining traction among Americans, namely white, Conservative thinkers, in efforts to paint Black Americans as lazy and unsuccessful within academic and professional spaces, contrastingly stereotyped Asian Americans as ambitious, well-mannered, and high-achieving. By creating and using the term "Asian American," people of Asian descent were able to utilize a label that empowered them without centering other racial prejudices, as well as dispelling harmful stereotypes to Asian Americans.

Gee's enduring impact on the development of Asian American Studies as an academic discipline and her larger dedication to social justice, education, and community empowerment are both reflected in the endowment.

=== Concept of Intersectionality ===
Throughout her career Intersectionality served as a core tenant of her beliefs. As a female Asian American advocate, academic, and mentor, Gee demonstrated the importance of intersectionality within the Asian American activist space, especially during a time when women's voices were often sidelined. Indirectly, Gee helped lay the groundwork for Asian American women to create spaces for their own activism. While Asian American activism started gaining traction throughout the country, the Asian American activist groups and Black American activist groups increasingly worked together in solidarity to advocate for their mutual equal rights. These groups' cooperation and allyship would lay the groundwork for the concept of intersectionality.

=== Role in feminism ===
Gee made significant contributions to the feminist movement by increasing the reach of feminist activism towards the experiences of women of color, particularly Asian American women. During the 1970s, mainstream feminism particularly reflected the perspectives of middle-class white women while often overlooking the unique struggles that came with minority women. Gee’s work recognizes this gap by creating spaces where Asian American voices could be heard and represented within the feminist sphere and broader U.S social discourse. In her edited collection Counterpoint: Perspectives on Asian America (1976), she collected many articles highlighting the struggles and experiences of women. Through this collection and other works like Shopping Bag, a monologue exploring the struggles of an elderly Chinese immigrant woman, Gee introduced minority perspectives that have previously received limited attention and feminist circles. Her efforts helped expand the scope of feminism to embrace the experiences of women, regardless of their racial or cultural background.

== Works ==
- Gee, Emma, ed. (1971). Asian Women. Berkeley, CA: University of California Press.
- Gee, Emma, ed. (1976). Counterpoint: Perspectives on Asian America. Los Angeles, CA: Asian American Studies Center.
