= UCLA Asian American Studies Center =

The University of California, Los Angeles Asian American Studies Center (AASC) is an organization that educates students and the general public about the history of Asian American and Pacific Islanders and their experiences. The AASC is one of the leading and groundbreaking organizations to have substantial and credible resources for their research. Located in Campbell Hall, the AASC quickly became a center for resource-gathering and scholarship for the Asian American movement. Asian American student organizations at CSULA, Occidental, USC, and other colleges soon followed. It was a vital hub and training ground for young activists, a place where they could earn a salary while doing community work.

== History ==
The AASC was founded in 1969 by student activists, community advocates, alumni, and faculty allies as a result of the Asian American Movement and the strikes by the Third World Liberation Front (TWLF). The Asian American movement which was most active during the 1960s through the 1970s was a sociopolitical movement for racial justice and protested against racism and US neo-imperialism. The movement demanded reformations in institutions such as colleges and universities and sought out social services such as healthcare, food, and housing for underrepresented Asian Americans. The TWLF was a coalition of the Black Students Union, the Latin American Students Organization, the Intercollegiate Chinese for Social Action, the Philippine American Collegiate Endeavor, American Indian Student Organization, Mexican American Student Confederation and the Asian American Political Alliance that formed in San Francisco State University and at the University of California, Berkeley in 1968–1969. Students of color protested against the university’s administrations for ethnic studies and open admissions in response to the Eurocentric education and lack of diversity within the disciplines and teachers. On November 6, 1968, African American, Asian American, Chicano, Latino, and Native American students initiated and sustained the San Francisco State Strike which became the longest student strike in US history and lasted for 167 days. On January 22, 1969, the UC Berkeley Third World Strikes began which continued the fight for student of colors to gain ethnic studies into their college education.

== Organization ==
The AASC serves the UCLA campus and students and faculty in the social sciences, the humanities department, and the professional schools. The center also serves the wider audiences in the state, nation, and internationally by bridging professionals, scholars, and leaders around the world to the UCLA community. The AASC is one of four ethnic studies centers established at UCLA in 1969 that are now part of the Institute of American Cultures (IAC) [iac site], which reports to the Office of the Chancellor at UCLA. The AASC works to initiate and advance innovative research, events that will promote awareness, diversity, advocacy, and discussion of issues related to race and ethnicity, fellowships and research grant programs, scholarships and civic engagement.

== Academics ==
The AASC’s formal Interdepartmental Degree Program was officially re-established as a Department of Asian American Studies at UCLA in 2004, during the thirty-fifth anniversary of the AASC. The Executive Board of the Academic Senate at UCLA voted in favor of departmentalization with the Chancellor’s approval.^{1} A community reception was held in the Los Angeles Chinatown to celebrate the new UCLA Department of Asian American Studies, where community members and leaders, such as California Assembly members Judy Chu and George Nakano, shared stories about how UCLA Asian American Studies had affected their lives.

Part of UCLA’s College of Letters and Science the undergraduate program in the Department offers a Bachelor of Arts degree for Asian American Studies. The graduate program of the Department offers a Master of Arts degree.

== Facilities ==
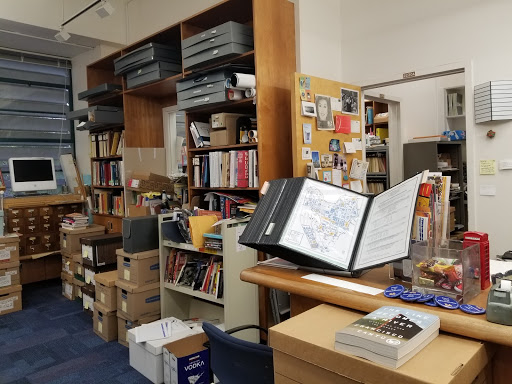
Inside the AASC Library/Reading Room

UCLA Asian American Studies Library/Reading Room (RR/L)

- The RR/L provides any student on campus with information on Asian American Studies. It is open at specific times during each quarter of the academic year. The RR/L tries to help the students and curriculum in two different ways: 1) developing and maintaining current information and research and 2) developing additional information to different resources.

== Publications ==
The AASC also produces publications through UCLA AASC Press, including Amerasia Journal, AAPI Nexus Journal, and CrossCurrents. AAPI Nexus is a national journal that focuses on policies, practices and community research and draws information from professional schools, applied social science scholars, practitioners and public policy advocates to support Asian American Studies’ mission to serve AAPI communities and provide practical research. The Center Press has published Amerasia Journal since 1971 and the founding publisher of Amerasia Journal was Don T. Nakanishi. Amerasia Journal played a crucial role in “establishing Asian American Studies as a relevant field of scholarship, teaching, community service, and public discourse.” CrossCurrents is the annual newsmagazine for AASC that covers the highlights of Asian American Studies and AASC’s community

== Alumni ==
- Jeff Chang (MA)
- York Chang
- John Delloro (MA)
- Alice Hom
- Florante Ibanez (MA)
- Scott Kurishige
- Emily Lawsin
- Dawn Mabalon (MA)
- Randall Park (MA)
- Jennifer F. Tseng (MA)
- Ali Wong (BA)
- Kristina Wong

== See also ==
- UCLA Chicano Studies Research Center
