= Alan Nishio =

American civil rights activist (1945–2023)

- Born: August 9, 1945; Los Angeles, US
- Died: December 27, 2023 (aged 78); Los Angeles, US
- Occupations: Professor, Activist
- Years active: 1968-2023
- Known for: Founding of Los Angeles AAPA Chapter, Professor at CSULB, CWRIC hearings speaker

Alan Takeshi Nishio (August 9, 1945 – December 27, 2023) was an American civil rights activist, educator and community leader. He was a prominent figure in the Japanese American redress movement, being a founding member of the National Coalition for Redress/Reparations (NCRR), and played a significant role in the development of Asian American studies in higher education. Born during World War II, in a Californian concentration camp, Nishio dedicated much of his life to the cause of securing redress for the mass incarceration of Japanese Americans during the war and promoting awareness of the issue. Additionally, Nishio worked as an administrator and educator in higher education, primarily at California State University, Long Beach (CSULB) and also worked to develop community organization to help serve Japanese Americans in Los Angeles.

== Early life and education ==
Alan Nishio was born on August 9, 1945—the day of the atomic bombings of Hiroshima and Nagasaki—in the Manzanar concentration camp in California, where his parents were imprisoned during World War II. The camp closed shortly after his birth, in November. After his parents left Manzanar, Nishio grew up in Los Angeles, around the Mar Vista neighborhood.

Nishio began as a math major at University of California, Los Angeles. At his sister's urging, he transferred to UC Berkeley, where involvement in the Free Speech Movement prompted him to change course and major in political science. Nishio earned a Bachelor of Arts in political science from the University of California, Berkeley, in 1966. After his time at UC Berkeley, he earned a Master of Arts in public administration from the University of Southern California (USC) in 1968.

Starting in 1968, Nishio worked to obtain a doctorate in public policy at USC which he did not finish. He also completed a certificate program in Asian studies at Sophia University in Tokyo in 1972.

== Family ==
Alan Nishio's parents were both Kibei, Japanese Americans born in the United States who spent part of their youth in Japan. His father, Kiyoshi Nishio (born circa 1911 in Whittier, California), returned to Japan around age four, living there until his mid-teens before returning to graduate from Gardena High School. He worked in his father's grocery store in Los Angeles before opening his own shop in the late 1930s. Following his marriage to Mitsui Tsujimura in approximately 1935 and their incarceration at Manzanar, he later worked as a gardener. Nishio's mother, Mitsui (Tsujimura) Nishio, was born in Seattle in 1917 and similarly returned to Japan in early childhood. She completed high school in Hiroshima before marrying and moving to California in the mid-1930s. During and after their time in Manzanar, she helped support the family—initially through the family grocery store, then by taking in laundry and later working in manufacturing. Alan's older sister was born in late November 1941, just weeks before Pearl Harbor, causing the family to hastily sell their business and pack their belongings.

== Career ==
While a student at the University of Southern California, Nishio served as the acting director of the UCLA Asian American Studies Center (AASC) during its founding in 1969. Nishio, and the other founders, formed the AASC in response to the Asian American Movement and the rise of the Third World Liberation Front (TWLF) to help serve the UCLA student body through education, spreading awareness, and promoting discussion on the topic of Asian Americans and Pacific Islanders. The AASC was founded alongside three other ethnic studies centers in 1969, forming the Institute of American Cultures (IAC) at UCLA in 1969. During the same time, Nishio also worked as the assistant director at the USC Center for Social Action.

Nishio then began a career at California State University, Long Beach (CSULB) starting in 1972 where he served as a professor and lecturer in the Department of Asian and Asian American Studies and as the Vice President for Student Services until his retirement in 2006. At CSULB, Nishio taught seminars in Asian American studies and advised students of the Asian American Student Association. As Associate Vice President for Student Services at CSULB, he supported low-income, underserved, and first-generation students of color. Concurrently, Nishio also served on the Little Tokyo Service Center Board of Directors from 1984 to 2022, serving as board president for twelve of those years.

In his later years, Nishio served as an advisor to Kizuna, an organization founded in growing young Japanese American leaders, and a charter member of the Japanese American National Museum. Nishio was also involved in the Manzanar Committee—an organization that raises awareness of the mass incarceration of people with Japanese ancestry in the United States during World War II—where he was a keynote speaker in 2020. Nishio served on the board of the Japanese American Cultural and Community Center and advised youth leadership initiatives including Kizuna and the California Japanese American Community Leadership Council.

== Activism ==
Nishio first began his political activism at UC Berkeley, where he participated in the Free Speech Movement. According to Nishio, this experience led him to change his undergraduate trajectory from mathematics to political science. At UC Berkeley Nishio learned the nature of his birthplace, Manzanar, as a concentration camp. In 1968, Nishio founded the Los Angeles chapter of the Asian American Political Alliance during his time as a doctoral student at USC. The Los Angeles Chapter of AAPA was involved and supported many movements, such as the strike to establish an ethnic studies program at San Francisco State, and sponsoring the first strike in Southern California in opposition of Title II of the Internal Security Act of 1950.

Nishio was a leader and co-founder of the Little Tokyo People's Rights Organization (LTPRO), a community organization advocating for residents and small businesses affected by the redevelopment of the Little Tokyo district in Los Angeles. LTPRO, during Nishio's tenure, fought to ensure affordable housing to senior citizens and challenged evictions caused by ongoing gentrification of the Little Tokyo community, including a plan to expand the LA Civic Center towards Little Tokyo in the 1970s. From the efforts of Nishio and organizations like LTPRO, Little Tokyo remains as one of the last remaining Japantowns in the United States. While serving as president on the board of directors of LTPRO, Nishio also brought the organization into the redress and reparations movement, starting one of the first efforts for Japanese American redress.

Nishio was deeply involved in the Japanese American redress and reparations movement. Believing that a community focused organization was needed to address Japanese American redress, Nishio co-founded the National Coalition for Redress/Reparations (NCRR) in 1980, now known as Nikkei for Civil Rights and Redress. As Southern California co-chair from 1980 to 1990, he played a role in organizing grassroots efforts to seek a formal apology and monetary reparations from the U.S. government for the incarceration of Japanese Americans during the war.

=== Role in the Commission on Wartime Relocation and Internment of Civilians (CWRIC) Hearings ===
In 1981, Alan Nishio participated in the Los Angeles hearings of the Commission on Wartime Relocation and Internment of Civilians representing the Gardena Committee for Redress and Reparations. As a co-founder of the National Coalition for Redress/Reparations, he was instrumental in organizing community testimonies that highlighted the injustices faced by Japanese Americans during World War II. This inclusivity led to over 150 testimonies, many from Nisei who had never spoken publicly about their wartime experiences. The emotional impact of these testimonies galvanized the community and underscored the necessity of redress. As noted in a retrospective article, "This issue sent shock waves throughout the community; and unleashed a dormant strength and power and determination within Japanese Americans to fight for and win redress and reparations. The turning point in the struggle, and one which had the deepest impact on many of us, took place during the CWRIC Hearings in 1981 where 750 survivors, mostly Nisei, stood up and testified!"

Nishio continued in the fight for redress and attended the 1987 NCRR Washington D.C. lobbying trip, culminating in the eventual signing of The Civil Liberties Act of 1988.

=== Motivation ===
As a student at the UC Berkeley during the height of the Free Speech Movement and the civil rights era, he heard Kwame Ture speak about the importance of organizing within one's own community, introducing him to the possibilities of grassroots community organizing. The turbulent climate and exposure to social justice movements—including protests against the Vietnam War—inspired a life-long commitment to activism. Nishio was deeply influenced by the Vietnam War protests writing, "I saw how incredibly racist the war was and how unjust the war was....these are Asians that are being killed by us for defending their land and their beliefs." After graduating, Nishio briefly considered joining the Peace Corps or pursuing theological study, influenced by Christian existentialist thinkers like Paul Tillich and Reinhold Niebuhr. Ultimately, he entered a graduate program in public administration at the USC, where he navigated a difficult period balancing studies with taking over his late father's gardening business. During the late 1960s, he immersed himself in multiracial organizing efforts in Los Angeles through the Center for Social Action, collaborating with groups such as the Black Panther Party, La Raza, etc.

== Honors and recognition ==
In 2016, Nishio was awarded the Order of the Rising Sun, Gold Rays with Rosette by the Government of Japan, recognizing his contributions to promoting mutual understanding and friendly relations between Japan and the United States. His leadership roles in organizations such as the Little Tokyo Service Center and the California Japanese American Community Leadership Council were highlighted as significant achievements.

In 2017, Nishio received the Sue Kunitomi Embrey Legacy Award from the Manzanar Committee.

In 2019, Nishio received the Nisei Week Inspiration Award, honoring his decades of service to the Japanese American community and his role in mentoring future leaders.

The Japanese American Citizens League (JACL) awarded Nishio the President's Lifetime Achievement Award at the JACL National Convention in June 2023.

In 2024, Nishio was posthumously honored among fifteen Asian American and Pacific Islander community leaders by the California State Legislature during Asian American and Pacific Islander Heritage Month.

== Publications ==
Nishio contributed to several publications that documented the struggles and achievements of the Japanese American community:

- Nishio, Alan. "The Oriental as a Middleman Minority." Gidra I 2 (1969): 3.
- Nishio, Alan. "Personal Reflections on the Asian National Movements." East Wind, Spring/Summer (1982): 36–38.
- NCRR: The Grassroots Struggle for Japanese American Redress and Reparations (2018) - This comprehensive account details the history and impact of the NCRR's campaign for redress. (Chapter 8: Getting Involved and Volunteer Power).

== Death and legacy ==
Nishio died due to cancer he was battling for 17 years on December 27, 2023. He is survived by Yvonne Wong Nishio, his wife.

Owing to his involvement in countless organizations, after his death Nishio was recognized with obituaries and memorials by:

- CSULB Asian and Asian American Studies
- Japanese American National Museum
- Little Tokyo Service Center
- Manzanar Committee
- Nichi Bei News
- Pacific Citizen
- Rafu Shimpo
- UCLA AASC
- U.S.-Japan Council
- USC Price School
