= Gidra (newspaper) =

- Type: Monthly newspaper
- Founded: April 1969
- Ceased publication: April 1974
- Language: English
- Headquarters: UCLA, Crenshaw
- Circulation: 4,000 Monthly
- Free online archives: http://ddr.densho.org/ddr/densho/297/

Gidra: The Monthly of the Asian American Experience, the self-proclaimed "voice of the Asian American movement," was a revolutionary monthly newspaper-magazine that ran from 1969 to 1974. It was started by a group of Asian American students at the University of California, Los Angeles as a platform to discuss Asian American interests on campus and later expanded to address the entire Los Angeles Asian American community. Sixty issues of Gidra were published during its primary run, as well as a 1990 anniversary issue and five issues between 2000 and 2001.

Gidra covered mainly issues affecting the Asian American community, including the anti-war movement; ethnic studies at universities; and the struggles of colonized people in Asia, Africa, and the Caribbean. Also crucial to the newspaper was art, mostly illustrations and poetry. Highly politicized, Gidra took stances that were anti-war, anti-imperialist, and anti-capitalist. One of the first newspapers of its kind in the Asian American community, it inspired the creation of other leftist publications and organizations. Espousing a Third Worldist ideology, Gidra encouraged solidarity with and had ties to paralleling social justice movements in the United States and decolonization movements abroad.

The entire collection of Gidra is available to download from the Densho Digital Repository.

Gidra was rebooted in 2019 with the permission of original members who contribute to the new www.Gidramedia.com.

== History ==
=== 1969-1970 ===
Gidra was conceptualized in February 1969 by a group of students at the University of California, Los Angeles in response to anti-Asian sentiment at the university and in greater Los Angeles. A year earlier, the Third World Liberation Front's 1968 strike had occurred at San Francisco State University. The strikers' demands against what they saw as an oppressive and racist administration led to the nation's first Ethnic Studies program. The aftermath of the strike brought about what historian Haivan Hoang called an "uncertainty" about the university's place, purpose, and future given movements for social justice sweeping the United States and growing discontent among university students of color. Hoang argued that it was in and because of this atmosphere that Gidra was created. Gidra was also created alongside the rise of radical third world grassroots student coalitions, in addition to the Black Power movement and Civil Rights Movement. After being denied official recognition by the university, the students started publishing Gidra independently, using the university's Asian American Studies Center as its headquarters.

The newspaper's name comes from the three-headed dragon King Ghidorah (キングギドラ Kingu Gidora) from the Japanese Godzilla movie franchise. The paper's mascot is a caterpillar with slanted eyes and a straw hat holding a sword-like pen. The "humble caterpillar" was chosen to be a reminder of guerrilla fighters in Vietnam, "Asian warriors who fought for their people and their pride without fear of death."

Gidra's founders were Dinora Gil, Laura Ho, Tracy Okida, Colin Watanabe, and Mike Murase. All were third-generation Asian American students at UCLA and had been involved with organizations like Oriental Concern or the UCLA Asian American Studies Center prior to founding the publication. As many as 250 people in total worked on the newspaper over the course of its original five year run. Though Gidra was created for the broader Asian American community, 78% of its staff in the first year was Japanese American.

Gidra practiced a non-hierarchical editorial organization and collective decision making. However, the paper was largely led by a core group of students.

The first issue of Gidra was published in April 1969, with the following mission statement:

Truth is not always pretty, not in this world. We try hard to keep from hearing about the feelings, concerns, and problems of fellow human beings when it disturbs us, when it makes us feel uneasy. And too often it is position and power that determine who is heard. This is why GIDRA was created. GIDRA is dedicated to truth. The honest expression of feeling or opinion, be it profound or profane, innocuous or insulting, from wretched or well-off—that is GIDRA. GIDRA is TRUTH.

An editorial in July of the same year elaborated:

Gidra was created to stimulate and inspire members of the Asian American community to vocalize their feelings and thoughts. Many, perhaps Asian Americans included, have come to the conclusion that Asian Americans don't have feelings or thoughts. But we feel that the very existence of a publication like Gidra belies the stereotype of the Asian American as a taciturn, unfeeling, and unresponsive individual.

Gidra's first issue discussed: the rise of "Third World" organizations on college campuses following the 1968 San Francisco strike; prostitution by Asian American women, the firing of Japanese American coroner Thomas Noguchi of Los Angeles County on allegedly racist grounds; and "yellow power" as "a call to reject our [Asian Americans'] past and present condition of powerlessness." On the last point, Gidra writer Larry Kubota clarified: "When we attain a position of power in society, we can have more control of our lives and begin to determine our own destiny." Subsequent issues included a broader range of topics affecting the Asian American community.

=== 1970-1974 ===
Gidra later relocated from UCLA to offices in the Crenshaw neighborhood of Los Angeles, California. With this move came a shift in the paper's focus from the university to the greater Los Angeles Asian American community. Co-founder Murase wrote, "During the first year, Gidra gradually changed its focus from the campus to the community, from Asian identity to Asian unity, and from 'what happened' to 'what can we do.'"

A number of historians have described Gidra's two stages of journalism. Hoang wrote, "These shifts in Gidra's conceptualization of the Asian American movement reflect the writers' emergent construction of an Asian American ethos, a subject position defined not only by racial otherness but also by social responsibility and third world nationalisms." Historian William Wei wrote, "The first was devoted to learning the technical skills required to publish a newspaper, to defining what kind of paper it wanted to be, and, consequently, to defining what it meant to be Asian American and involved in the Asian American Movement; the second was devoted to covering the antiwar movement, counterculture lifestyles, and radical politics." Gidra's widened focus was also brought on in part by the UCLA strike and "police riot" against U.S. militarism in Cambodia in May 1970, along with the Kent State and Jackson State shootings.

Another reason for the new orientation was to respond to criticisms that the paper was too subjective and cynical about the U.S. legacy of imperialism and racism. Gidra began including illustrations, comics, and less explicitly political articles about Asian culture around this time. Murase explained, "We [at Gidra] tried to extend the role Gidra plays in the ongoing revolution both through collective policy decisions and our personal interactions. Therefore there is much more freedom than consistency in our pages. As we continue to generate alternatives, make choices, and learn from the past, our practice will inevitably be more free than consistent."

In addition, Gidra faced bureaucratic divisions stemming from an inequality of power among staff that arose from the paper's nonhierarchical organization. In the absence of paid salaries, new staff came and left frequently. In 1971, Gidra established a system of rotating monthly coordinators responsible for each month's publication, and in 1972 the staff of Gidra began a study group called the Westside Collective, having three parts:

1. The Objective Conditions—Racism, Sexism, Capitalism, Imperialism...and alienation, inequality and irrationality ...which engenders avarice, individualism, intolerance, irresponsibility, negative self-image, and pessimism. We wanted to study Asian American and Third World histories, the War, the institutions in our society, the state of the Movement, etc.
2. The Goals—Humanism, Socialism...? The examples of the Vietnamese, the People's Republic. ...collectivity, self-respect, self-reliance, self-determination, self-discipline, self-defense.
3. How to Get from One to the Other. Step by step....

As part of the study group, staff started living together in what was dubbed the "Gidra House." Part of the purpose of this study group was to reflect on Gidra's relevance in the evolving Asian American Movement. The staff of Gidra ultimately came to the conclusion that Gidra in its then-current form was no longer as necessary.

The last issue of Gidra was published in April 1974, five years after its first publication. Among the issue's eighty pages was an article titled "Toward Barefoot Journalism" by Mike Murase that expressed uncertainty about Gidra's future and gave reasons for the paper's dissolution. Murase wrote, "There is a shared feeling, a premonition if you will, that now is somehow a good time to sum up our experiences. We want to go on, continue publishing, but we need now to see how far we have come, so that we may be clear about where we are headed and how we will get there." Murase also cited problems with staffing and editorial organization, personal and publication-related financial struggles, and the feeling among staff that the process of assembling the paper "had become mechanical, individualized, and alienating." In his last article, Murase wrote,

As we continue to struggle, what needs resembling now is the richness and vitality of this total experience called Gidra, which is much more than a newspaper. It has been an experience in sharing—in giving and receiving—in a sisterly and brotherly atmosphere. It has meant a chance to actively work for something we really believe in. It has meant a chance to express ourselves in a variety of ways. It has been a lesson in humility and perseverance. It has meant working with people who care about people, and genuinely feeling the strength that can only come out of collective experiences. But, what a struggle!

The staff of Gidra left open the possibility of continuing Gidra in the future or possibly creating a new publication more suited to the Movement. Staffers continued meeting after Gidra's final issue, and most stayed actively involved in the field.

Over its five-year lifespan, Gidra's press release averaged approximately 4,000 copies per month with 900-1300 subscribers mostly in the Los Angeles area, largely college students. However, readership was likely higher due to copies being circulated and viewed by multiple people.

== Content ==
Gidra covered a wide range of issues affecting the Asian American community, including those having to do with racism within the university and greater Los Angeles; U.S. imperialism and militarism in the midst of the Vietnam War; and Asian American, African American, Native American, and Latino social justice movements and "third world" organizations. However, the breadth of topics was much larger. Articles were "a mix of news, rhetoric, advertisements, cartoons, drawings, poems, dramatic pieces, and short fiction."

Gidra drew inspiration from radical organizations, like the Third World Liberation Front and the Black Panthers, and ideologies, like Black Power and Yellow Power. Gidra also drew from the works of prominent revolutionaries like Frantz Fanon, Mao Zedong, Che Guevara, Martin Luther King Jr., and Malcolm X. Because its staff was mostly Japanese American, issues that affected Japanese Americans like the incarceration of Japanese Americans during World War II, camp pilgrimages, and the redevelopment of Little Tokyo, were often discussed. However, Gidra was largely critical of Japan itself, especially in the context of U.S.-Japan relations, militarism, and imperialism.

In 1971, Gidra began to publish in-depth topic specific issues, one focused on Asian American women and another on youth through a "street-perspective." The January 1971 "Women's issue" read, "We are Third World, Asian sisters uniting in the struggle for liberation. Amerikan society has reduced women to economic and psychological servitude, and third world women and men to racist and dehumanizing stereotypes. We, as Asian women have united to [...] struggle with our brothers against male chauvinism and join in constructing new definitions for self-determination in the revolutionary society."

As part of the paper's content shift in the early 1970s, Gidra began expanding its scope to include ethnic food recipes, articles on how to sew and garden, and even an article on how to fix a toilet. Gidra also published articles about effective protest and activism. Staff member Jeff Furumura wrote, "It's all part of building self-reliance, and in the process, creating our own alternatives. By breaking down those mystical exaggerations concerning who is able to fix this, who is qualified to operate that, we learn to do a lot of those things ourselves."

Also crucial to the newspaper were art, photography, and poetry. Gidra illustrator David Monkawa wrote, "We want to free our minds at the same time you free yours by developing them through looking at comics, movies, books and television with a critical eye; that is, asking ourselves 'how' the thing we're viewing is supposed to be judged." Cartoons were often imbued with humor and critiques of society. Writer and activist Karen Ishizuka observed how "With the capacity to spar swiftly and deftly with serious issues, [political cartoons] can strike at the heart of social issues with exaggerated caricature, stinging reversals, and droll but profound impropriety."

== Reception ==
=== 1969-1974 ===
Over its five-year run, Gidra garnered both praise and criticism within prominent Asian American circles. According to Rocky Chin, "If there is an 'Asian-American Movement' publication, it is Gidra, the most widely circulated Asian American newspaper-magazine in the country." Wimp Hiroto of the Los Angeles-based Japanese American community newspaper Crossroads praised Gidra's mission. Kats Kunitsugu of the Kashu Mainichi gave Gidra mixed reviews, while Gidra and the prominent Japanese American newspaper Rafu Shimpo had publicized disagreements over coverage of controversial topics affecting the Asian American community, most notably the dismissal of Los Angeles County Coroner Thomas Noguchi.

Among those outside of the Movement, Gidra garnered more criticism. In the final edition of Gidra, Murase described letters Gidra received from the greater Los Angeles community, including one from a "Chinese woman in Los Angeles [who] called Gidra 'atrocious,' and intimated that the quality of the newspaper can only improve when 'some of you staff members (who are) SDS members and gangsters depart.'" Another letter read, "I don't know what is wrong with you poor minority groups. As a while mother Im awfully proud of it. [...] it must be awful to be what you are, that you have to go so low that you have ot use nasty words to express your selfs your naughty nasty thilthy little people and I pity your kind. [sic]"

As Gidra's focus and contents shifted in the early 1970s, Gidra received criticisms for being both too radical in politicized antiwar articles and too "white hippie counterculture" in cultural and how-to articles. However, Wei argues that the latter criticisms were "unwarranted." He writes, "From the beginning, the paper had encouraged the development of a distinctive Asian American culture and an understanding of the complex relations among people in the Movement."

=== Present ===
Today, many historians and scholars agree on Gidra's significance. Ethnic studies scholar Daryl Maeda called Gidra "the premiere movement periodical." Likewise, Hoang wrote, "Whether composition scholars were aware of the periodical, Gidra and publications like it left a legacy for later racial minority students, a legacy in which writing would be seen as a vehicle to cultivating racial and political awareness." Hoang argued that the publication of Gidra inspired the publication of many other revolutionary student-run publications at universities mostly in California in the 1990s and 2000s. In the 20th anniversary issue, Nelson Nagai credited Gidra with inspiring the formation of the Asian American youth organization Yellow Seed, writing, "Gidra was our window into Asian America. Through Gidra we found out that there were other groups around America that were trying to define Asian America and what part Asian Americans had in the civil rights movement and the anti-war, anti-imperialist movement." In addition, Gidra is credited for inspiring the founding of another radical Asian American newspaper Rodan, which was also named after a Godzilla character. In the end, Wei wrote that the reason for Gidra's end was its success, as it inspired the creation of other revolutionary periodicals and organizations that competed for resources, readers, and staff.

Of Gidra's continuing legacy, historian Brian Niiya wrote that "the 247 people who worked on the original Gidra over its life represented some of the best and brightest of the Sansei generation, and many have gone on to distinguished careers in law, academia, medicine, and other fields, while many continue to remain active in fighting on behalf of Asian American communities today." Writer and activist Karen Ishizuka wrote, "Gidra was as irreverent as it was earnest and as thought-provoking as it was reflexive."
