= Gidra =

Gidra may refer to:

- Nickname for Serbian actor Dragomir Bojanić (1933–1993)
- Nickname for Serbian martial artist Miodrag Stojanović (1950–2001)
- Gidra (newspaper) (1969-1974), Asian-American monthly
- Gidra (river), river in Slovakia
- Gidra language, another name for the Wipi language
