= Don Nakanishi =

- Born: August 14, 1949; Boyle Heights, Los Angeles
- Died: March 21, 2016
- Education: Bachelor's degree in political science from Yale University PhD in political science from Harvard University
- Alma mater: Yale University
- Notable work: National Asian Pacific American Political Almanac

Don Nakanishi (August 14, 1949 – March 21, 2016) was a professor and director of the Asian American Studies Center at the University of California, Los Angeles. Nakanishi is known for establishing Asian American Studies as a "viable and relevant field of scholarship."

He was the pioneer of Asian American studies in the United States and was influential in expanding the influence of Asian-American descent.

== Early life ==
Nakanishi was born on August 14, 1949, to two Japanese immigrants in the Boyle Heights neighborhood of Los Angeles, California. He attended a Japanese school up until the 11th grade and was "very involved in the Japanese-American community;" however due to his multicultural surroundings, he was exposed to many other ways of life. Nakanishi was a bright student and at his high school graduation he was elected boy mayor of Los Angeles. This level of academic and social achievement, permitted Nakanishi to be accepted into Yale University at the age of 16. He was a member of the most diverse class in Yale's history at the time, being one of twenty one minority students.

== Collegiate life ==
As one of the few minority students at Yale, life proved difficult for a young Nakanishi. Even though World War II had been over for 20 years, there was still a great deal of ill will towards those of Japanese descent because of the war and, specifically, the bombings at Pearl Harbor. As a result, Nakanishi was alienated by many of his classmates. This sense of alienation came to a head when, on December 7th (the anniversary of the bombings at Pearl Harbor) of his first year, a group of students trooped into his dorm room and "bombed" him with water balloons. One student even went so far as to memorize Franklin D. Roosevelt's declaration of war speech and recited it to Nakanishi. Soon after this event, Nakanishi started Yale's Asian American Student Association and co-founded the Amerasia Journal, which is now the preeminent journal of Asian American studies. Don Nakanishi received his bachelor's degree in political science from Yale in 1971 and received his PhD in political science from Harvard University in 1978.

== Tenure battle ==
After teaching at UCLA for a number of years, Nakanishi applied for and was denied tenure by UCLA officials in 1987. Nakanishi believed this decision was a result of overt racial discrimination due to his extensive contributions in his field and took his case to court. Many UCLA students protested the school's decision and the ensuing legal battle also drew the attention of the media. The legal battle lasted several years and resulted in Nakanishi receiving his tenured position in 1989. Don Nakanishi was the first Asian American to be granted tenure by a highly accredited university. He set the precedent for others to follow in his footsteps.

== Scholarship ==
Nakanishi co-founded the Amerasia Journal, and wrote more than 100 books, articles, and papers that focused on different social issues that plague society as a whole, not only minorities. Some of his scholarly works are his compilation of a National Pacific Asian American Political Almanac, in which he listed all of the Asian Americans that were involved in American politics, and his book "Asian American Politics: Law, Participation, and Policy," which helped to advance the fields of Asian American political and educational research.

== Nakanishi Prize ==
A tradition since 2006 during Yale College Class Day, the Nakanishi Prize is "awarded to two graduating seniors who have provided exemplary leadership in enhancing race and/or ethnic relations at Yale College during their undergraduate career while maintaining high standards of academic achievement."
