= Yuji Ichioka =

American historian and civil rights activist (1936–2002)

- Born: June 23, 1936; San Francisco, California, U.S.
- Died: September 1, 2002 (aged 66)
- Occupation: Historian of Asian American Studies
- Known for: Coining the term Asian American with Emma Gee; Co-founding the Asian American Political Alliance
- Spouse: Emma Gee

Academic background
- Education: UCLA, UC Berkeley

Academic work
- Discipline: Asian American Studies
- Institutions: UCLA

Yuji Ichioka (Japanese: 市岡 雄二, June 23, 1936 – September 1, 2002) was a Japanese American historian and civil rights activist who was a pioneer in the field of Asian American Studies and a leading figure in the Asian American movement. Alongside his wife Emma Gee, he is credited for coining the term "Asian American" and founding the Asian American Political Alliance to help unify different Asian ethnic groups under one shared identity.

== Early life and education ==
Yuji Ichioka was born in 1936 in San Francisco, California. As a child, he and his family were interned at Utah's Topaz War Relocation Center following the 1942 signing of Executive Order 9066, which ordered the internment of Japanese-Americans in the U.S. After release, Ichioka's family moved to Berkeley in search of a new start. Ichioka finished grade school there, graduating from Berkeley High School in 1954.

After three years of U.S. military service in Europe, Ichioka enrolled in UCLA. In 1962, he graduated with a B.A. in history. The following year, Ichioka enrolled in Columbia University's graduate program studying Chinese history, where he met Emma Gee. However, he quickly dropped out due to his dissatisfaction with academia and instead became a youth parole worker at a social service agency in New York. In 1966, he took an extended trip to Japan and became interested in the migration of Japanese Issei (first generation Japanese immigrants) to the U.S. Upon return to the U.S., Ichioka enrolled in a graduate program at UC Berkeley, where he received an M.A. in East Asian Studies two years later.

== Asian American Political Alliance (AAPA) ==
During his time at Berkeley, Ichioka noticed that Asian Americans had little political visibility despite their consistent attendance at political demonstrations. He hypothesized that Asian American advocacy lacked efficacy due to the absence of a common identity or "banner" that the group could band together behind. Therefore, in a time when many social movements like the Black Power Movement, American Indian Movement, and anti-war movement had begun to make great strides, Ichioka founded the Asian American Political Alliance (AAPA) with his partner Emma Gee to unite Asian Americans under one shared identity. In doing so, Ichioka and Gee were also the first to coin the term "Asian American" and use it to mobilize people of Asian descent on a national level, replacing the outdated labels of "Oriental" or "Asiatic" that were previously used to refer to people of Asian ancestry.

The AAPA's focus on pan-Asian unity and political activism set it apart from other Asian cultural groups. By searching for students with Asian surnames on the directories of on-campus political groups, Ichioka and Gee were able to bring together activists from many Asian ethnic groups. Together, the group took progressive stances on many political issues, including protesting the U.S.' involvement in the Vietnam war and supporting anti-colonialist political movements in third-world countries. The AAPA inspired the formation of similar pan-Asian organizations across the country, starting from the West Coast and eventually spreading to the east.

== Career ==
Ichioka is considered a pioneering scholar in the field of Asian Studies. His scholarship not only highlighted the external struggles faced by the Issei community – with his seminal work The Issei: The World of the First Generation Japanese Immigrants including the first in-depth analysis of the Ozawa v. United States case – but also explored lesser known internal struggles faced within the Issei community, such as entanglements between Issei prostitutes and patriarchal community leaders or between railroad workers and co-ethnic labor contractors. Through his work, Ichioka disrupted the stereotype that Asians were politically "docile" by documenting the strikes and demonstrations organized by Asian-Americans against exploitative employers and discriminatory laws. Furthermore, Ichioka studied Issei experience in relation to transnational politics and government, illuminating the complicated relationship between Issei and the Japanese government as well as the influence that U.S.-Japan diplomacy had on national race/immigration politics.

Ichioka's scholarly contributions to the field of Asian studies were widely recognized. He was awarded the 1989 U.S. History Book Award of the National Association for Asian American studies for The Issei: The World of the First Generation Japanese Immigrants. His subsequent research was documented in the two books A Buried Past and A Buried Past II. At his death, Ichioka left behind a nearly-completed manuscript of his second book, Before Internment: Essays in Prewar Japanese American History, which was later edited and posthumously published by Eiichiro Azuma and Gordon Chang. Before Internment focused on Japanese-American experience in the 1930s, exploring sensitive topics like Japanese-American loyalty amongst others that had previously been considered taboo.

Throughout his scholarship, Ichioka placed great emphasis on centering primary sources. He made significant contributions to the collection of Issei primary sources for the Japanese American Research Project by recovering letters, diaries, and newspapers related to early Issei experience in the U.S. As a scholar, Ichioka made efforts to understand migrant experience from a holistic and transnational lens, aiming to identify how broader forces of history like war, racism, nationalism, and imperialism influenced Issei perspectives, decisions, and behaviors. His dedication to preserving authentic immigrant experiences through his work reflects his belief that they are central to our understanding of history:

"Our ignorance of the history of Japanese immigrants and their descendants is due not to a lack of historical sources, but to the failure of past and present researchers to study existing Japanese-language sources."

Ichioka was known not only for his work, but also his mentorship and willingness to share archive resources/materials. To this day, many Asian Studies scholars rely on his work on these archives due to a lack of Japanese language proficiency.

Ichioka's role as a trailblazer in the field of Asian studies also extends into the classroom. In 1969, Ichioka taught the first Asian American Studies course at UCLA, and he was named associate director of the university's newly formed Asian American Studies Center (AASC). Ichioka later served as a senior research associate at the AASC and worked as an adjunct professor of history at UCLA up until his death.

== Legacy ==
Ichioka died due to cancer on September 1, 2002. He was survived by Gee, his wife of over 25 years.

The Yuji Ichioka and Emma Gee Endowment in Social Justice and Immigration Studies was established in their name at the UCLA Asian American Studies Center.

== Selected publications ==
- Yuji Ichioka. (1988). The Issei: The World of the First Generation Japanese Immigrant, 1885-1924. Free Press. ISBN 978-0-02-932435-6.
- Ichioka, Y. (1990). "Japanese Immigrant Nationalism: The Issei and the Sino-Japanese War, 1937-1941". California History. 69 (3): 260–275, 310–311. doi:10.2307/25591553. JSTOR 25591553.
- "Beyond National Boundaries: The Complexity of Japanese-American History". Amerasia Journal. 23 (2). 1997.
- Compiled by Yuji Ichioka, Eiichiro Azuma. (1989). A Buried Past II: A Sequel to the Annotated Bibliography of the Japanese American Research Project Collection. Univ of California La Asian Amer. ISBN 978-0-934052-29-0.
- Yuji Ichioka. Ed. by Gordon H. Chang ... (2006). Before Internment Essays in Prewar Japanese American History. Stanford University Press. ISBN 978-0-8047-5147-6.
