= Asian American Political Alliance =

1960s American political organization

- Abbreviation: AAPA
- Formation: May 1968
- Founders: Yuji Ichioka; Emma Gee
- Dissolved: 1969
- Type: Student and community activist organization
- Key people: Yuji Ichioka; Emma Gee; Alan Nishio; Richard Aoki; Penny Nakatsu
- Affiliations: TWLF

The Asian American Political Alliance (AAPA) was a political organization started at University of California, Berkeley in 1968 that aimed to unite all Asian Americans under one identity to push for political and social action. The two main chapters were at UC Berkeley, and San Francisco State College, both of which became heavily involved in the larger Asian American movement throughout the 1960s, including at the Third World Liberation Front strikes at SF State and at UC Berkeley. The AAPA identified as an anti-imperialistic, Third World political organization that fought for self-determination and liberation for Asian Americans. They expressed solidarity and support for other people of color throughout the US and throughout the world, particularly in colonized or recently decolonized countries. The AAPA's participation in the Third World Liberation Front strikes at SF State and UC Berkeley resulted in the creation of a School of Ethnic Studies at SF State and an Ethnic Studies department at UC Berkeley. The AAPA was also involved in movements such as the Black Power Movement and the anti-Vietnam War movement. Although both main chapters were short-lived and disbanded in 1969, the AAPA played a large role in the Asian American movement and was influential in encouraging other Asian Americans to get involved in political action.

== Origins ==
The AAPA was created in May 1968 at UC Berkeley by Yuji Ichioka and Emma Gee. Ichioka and Gee had noticed that most of the Asian Americans who were taking part in student protests were only participating as individuals rather than as a coalition. Because of this, they wanted to create an organization to unite all Asian Americans under one group to fight for social and political change. To do this, they looked through the roster of the Peace and Freedom Party and invited everyone with Asian surnames to discuss the idea for a potential group at a meeting. The first meeting was held in Ichioka and Gee's apartment, where they decided to form the Asian American Political Alliance. Many of the original founding members from this first meeting had prior political experience through anti-war movements, United Farm Workers, the Black Panther Party, or the civil rights movement. Although most of them were students at UC Berkeley, they did not want AAPA to be a student organization; rather, they aimed to create a wide-reaching, community grassroots organization. They purposefully chose the words "Political" and "Alliance" as part of their name in order to show that they were a political organization aimed towards Third World liberation, not a social or cultural club. The words "Asian American" were used to signify that this group was created as a multi-ethnic group to unite all Asians. This was the first use of the term "Asian American" instead of terms like "Oriental" that were used before.

In Los Angeles, Alan Nishio founded another chapter or AAPA, which advocated for numerous issues, including the student protests for ethnic studies at SFSU, and the strike in opposition to Title II of the Internal Security Act of 1950.

The AAPA drew Asian Americans from a multitude of ethnic and socioeconomic backgrounds, including Chinese, Filipino, and Japanese Americans, as well as from a range of immigration generations. Additionally, the AAPA drew political activists, community workers, and students from other social organizations at UC Berkeley, such as the Chinese Students Club and the Nisei Students Club. Floyd Huen, a member of the Berkeley AAPA, wrote that the AAPA "raised the political and social level of the debate; it consciously considered the formation of a 'yellow caucus' within the nascent Peace and Freedom Party...[it] represented the earnings of a racially common group of American youth were who tired of being labeled 'oriental and 'meek and passive' and who wanted self-define like other groups."

== Ideology ==
The AAPA sought to build a multi-ethnic Asian American political movement and create alliances with other people of color. It advocated for self-determination for Asian Americans and all people of color, supported all oppressed people around the world, and declared solidarity with colonized and decolonized nations around the world. The AAPA was heavily influenced by the Black Power movement, the anti-Vietnam War movement, and the Third World Liberation Movement. In fact, members often met to read political writings, including Mao Zedong, Franz Fanon, and the Black Panther Party Newspaper, in order to provide context for the activism they were involved in. The AAPA showed support for Third World movements by praising the Bandung Conference as a past example of solidarity and opposing American imperialism, such as the Vietnam War, which they believed was a war waged by the US in the interests of corporations. Additionally, the AAPA argued strongly against the model minority myth because they believed that it purposefully separated Asian Americans and other racialized groups by inaccurately portraying Asian Americans as docile, obedient, and successful. Instead, the AAPA rejected assimilation into whiteness and tried to build relationships with other people of color.

On July 28, 1968, Richard Aoki gave a speech at an AAPA rally at UC Berkeley, where he described the AAPA's ideology in depth.

"We Asian-Americans believe that American society has been, and still is, fundamentally a racist society, and that historically we have accommodated ourselves to this society in order to survive...We Asian-Americans support all non-white liberation movements and believe that all minorities in order to be truly liberated must have complete control over the political, economic, and social institutions within their respective communities. We unconditionally, support the struggles of the Afro-American people, the Chicanos, and the American Indians to attain freedom, justice, and equality… We are unconditionally against the war in Vietnam… In conclusion, I would like to add that the Asian American Political Alliance is not just another Sunday social club. We are an action-oriented group, and we will not just restrict our activities to merely ethnic issues, but to all issues that are of fundamental importance pertaining to the building of a new and a better world."

In 1969, the AAPA published a newspaper, "AAPA Perspectives", which further detailed its core values, beliefs, and goals.

"[The AAPA] is a people's alliance to effect social and political changes. We believe that the American society is historically racist and one which has systematically employed social discrimination and economic imperialism, both domestically and internationally, exploiting all non-white people in the process of building up their affluent society...The goal of AAPA is political education and advancement of the movement among Asian people, so that they may make all decisions that affect their own lives."

== Activities ==
AAPA was involved in many political movements, including the Third World Liberation Front Strikes at both SF State College and UC Berkeley, the Free Huey movement, the anti-Vietnam War movement, and the I-Hotel movement. Some of the AAPA's everyday activities included holding meetings to raise political consciousness and focus on political action. The AAPA also took part in activities surrounding WWII internment camps. Floyd Huen, a member of the Berkeley AAPA, wrote that Yuji Ichioka "educated all of us about the trauma and danger of the internment of his community during the war, first raising the campaign to repeal the McCarran Act." Some of the other actions the AAPA was involved in include participating in Chinatown forums and the MASC boycott at UC Berkeley. The AAPA was also a member of the Asian Association and the Asian Coalition. Furthermore, it supported the United Farm Workers strike in 1970 by sending members to Delano, California to investigate issues faced by Chicano and Filipino farmworkers, where they found that the workers faced racial discrimination, poverty, and inadequate healthcare.

=== SF State ===
In the summer of 1968, Penny Nakatsu and two other Japanese American women founded the San Francisco State College AAPA after they met at a Berkeley AAPA meeting and agreed that SF State College needed a chapter of its own. The SF State AAPA had a large Japanese American membership, with many 3rd generation Japanese Americans, or Sansei. Many of the SF State AAPA's activities and ideologies were similar to or influenced by the Berkeley AAPA, and they often met with Berkeley AAPA members to study works by Mao Zedong and Black Power leaders.

The SF State AAPA joined the SF State Third World Liberation Front in summer of 1968 along with many other student groups of color, including the BSU (Black Student Union), MASC (Mexican American Students Confederation), PACE (Philippine-American Collegiate Endeavor), and ICSA (Intercollegiate Chinese for Social Action). Together, they fought for a School of Ethnic Studies within SF State to provide an education relevant to their communities. In addition, they fought for self-determination, open admissions for minority students, and more minority faculty.

The AAPA organized a public, community protest against S.I. Hayakawa, the SF State president at the time, in order to express Japanese Americans' disapproval of him and distance the Japanese community from him. They also held community forums within the Japanese American community to build support for the student strike by showing how the strike would positively affect the Japanese American community.

The Third World Liberation Front (TWLF) strike at SF State became the longest student strike in history. Eventually, they were successful in challenging school officials and getting the first School of Ethnic Studies, including a department for Asian American Studies. Furthermore, the AAPA's participation in it showed the potential of Asian American activism. According to scholar Karen Umemoto, this strike "marked a 'shedding of silence' and an affirmation of identity" for Asian American students.

=== UC Berkeley ===
On January 11, 1969, the UC Berkeley AAPA, along with the Berkeley Chinese Students Club and Nisei Students Club, organized a symposium titled "The Asian Experience in America/Yellow Identity" in order to discuss Asian identity, talk about Asian American studies, and garner support for the TWLF strike. This symposium brought together college students from all over California, who came together to write a resolution to fully support the SF State strike and express Asian American solidarity with other people of color. After the SF State strike, the Berkeley AAPA helped to form the Berkeley Third World Liberation Front along with the Afro-American Student Union, the Mexican American Students Confederation, and the Native American Student Union. They participated in the TWLF strike at Berkeley in 1969, which helped lead to the establishment of an Ethnic Studies department, which contained a division for Asian American studies. In addition, they negotiated with the university administration to establish an experimental course in Asian/American Studies in winter of 1969, which contained topics such as the Vietnam War, imperialism and colonialism in Asia, and Asian American history, and contemporary Asian American issues.

=== Free Huey movement ===
The AAPA coordinated events and demonstrations with the Black Panther Party and the Red Guards calling for justice for the Black Panther Party. It had especially close ties with the Black Panther Party because one of AAPA's prominent members, Richard Aoki, was a member of both the Black Panther Party and the AAPA. In particular, the AAPA supported the Free Huey movement, which aimed to get Huey Newton, the co-founder of the Black Panther Party, released from jail on the charges of killing a police officer. AAPA used posters with "Free Huey" written in multiple languages, including English, Mandarin Chinese, Japanese, and Tagalog. Even though most AAPA members spoke English, they chose to also use other Asian languages to demonstrate that Asian Americans stood in solidarity with Newton because they were also people of color. Furthermore, the presence of many different Asian languages illustrated how the AAPA tried to unite multiple Asian ethnicities together. The support for the Free Huey movement emphasized the AAPA's anti-assimilation ideology and support for other racialized groups. Eventually the charges were overturned and Newton was released on August 5, 1970.

=== Anti-Vietnam War movement ===
The AAPA was strongly against the Vietnam War. In 1969, the AAPA stated that it opposed the Vietnam War not because American soldiers were being killed, but because it recognized that the Vietnamese people were struggling for self-determination and independence against U.S. imperialism. The AAPA made their opposition to the Vietnam War an integral tenet of its ideology, and declared that it opposed the imperialistic policies of the U.S. and instead supported the demands of the Vietnamese National Liberation Front.

=== Legacy and ongoing impact ===
AAPA’s actions laid the foundation for the awakening of Asian American political consciousness. It introduced the term “Asian American” into the national political discourse for the first time, uniting ethnically diverse Asian groups under a common cause. This "Asian" centered political identity completely changed the stereotype of Asians as passive, dispersed, and depoliticized, and became the ideological core of the subsequent Asian American Movement.

The AAPA’s efforts shaped how Asian Americans later operated, setting a precedent for political organizing and community leadership. The AAPA not only created a new space of identity through language, but also set a model for how political organizations should operate through concrete actions such as repealing Title II of the McCarran Act (Emergency Detention Act) and its extensive involvement in civil rights issues contributed to later movements focused on racial justice, anti-imperialism, and solidarity building with other marginalized groups such as African American, Mexican and Native American students to participate in the Third World Liberation Front's strike movement.

The AAPA’s role in the civil rights struggle influenced its members and inspired future generations of activists. The coalition-building strategies employed by the AAPA proved crucial to the subsequent success of campaigns, including the struggles of the Filipino farmworkers’ movement and the university’s ethnic studies program.

The AAPA was a major influence in inspiring both its own members and other Asian Americans across the United States to participate in political organizing and fight for social change. After it disbanded, its members continued to participate in many Asian American organizations and causes. For example, some members decided to establish the Asian Community Center, which participated in the protests to save International Hotel.

In addition, the AAPA inspired organizations like Triple A and I Wor Kuen. The SF State AAPA's activism helped contribute to the founding of the School of Ethnic Studies at SF State, which encouraged other colleges to follow suit soon after. Furthermore, other AAPAs were created at many universities and locations across the US, by people who were inspired by the UC Berkeley and SF State AAPAs, including at Yale University, Columbia University, and UCLA, and in places such as New York and Hawaii.

== Disappearance ==
The UC Berkeley chapter of AAPA disbanded in 1969 after the successful Third World Liberation Front strike at UC Berkeley. The SF State AAPA also decided in 1969 after the TWLF strike at SF State to disband. On November 10, 2018, past and present members of AAPA (reformed in 2018 as AAPA 3.0) at UC Berkeley commemorated the 50th anniversary of its founding at 2005 Hearst Ave., its former meeting place, with a placement of a plaque.

Flyer announcing the formation of AAPA at UCLA in 1969 (Side 1)

Flyer announcing the formation of AAPA at UCLA in 1969 (Side 2)
