= Intercollegiate Chinese for Social Action =

- Formation: 1967; 59 years ago
- Headquarters: Chinatown, San Francisco

The Intercollegiate Chinese for Social Action (ICSA) was a student organization formed in 1967 at San Francisco State College (now San Francisco State University). The group organized various community-oriented events and service projects, particularly in the Chinatown community in San Francisco. In 1968, the ICSA joined the Third World Liberation Front (TWLF), a coalition of different student groups advocating for campus reform at SFSU. The ICSA also actively protested traditional Chinese leadership, in particular the Six Companies in San Francisco.

== Background ==
The ICSA was formed in 1967, composed mainly of middle-class, US-born, Chinese American students. The majority were second-generation, had immigrant parents, and were first-generation college students. Most of their parents worked lower-paying jobs in restaurants, small local businesses, or clothing factories, but were still able to provide comfortable, middle-class life-styles for their children. Through an active recruitment program, the ICSA reached out to and recruited students from San Francisco Chinatown to expand its membership.

== Community outreach programs ==
The ICSA started out as a community service oriented organization. They founded the Community Internship Program, where students at San Francisco State College were recruited to volunteer for local San Francisco Chinatown organizations, such as the War on Poverty office, a federal government program. Members of the ICSA also engaged in academic tutoring and taught English to first-generation students and families in Chinatown. Later, through funding from the San Francisco State College’s Associated Student Government, the ICSA set up a youth center in San Francisco Chinatown.

== Third World Liberation Front Strikes ==
The Third World Liberation Front (TWLF) was a coalition of various minority student organizations at SFSC that pressed for campus reform. Specifically, they criticized the lack of ethnic studies and the lack of diversity at the college. The ICSA was originally introduced to the TWLF when an ICSA member accidentally walked into a TWLF protest. He was later approached by members of the Black Student Union, who were impressed with his perceived militancy and asked him to join the TWLF.

The ICSA was at first reluctant to join both because of the TWLF's perceived radicalism and because they did not view it as directly contributing to their goals and mission. The ICSA had two main concerns. First, they thought did not think that the TWLF would benefit Chinese people directly. This was later resolved when they realized that the TWLF had similar goals of increasing minority representation in colleges through "counseling, tutoring service, and special admission." The second concern that they had was that joining the TWLF would shift away resources from working with the Chinatown community. The decision as to whether to join the TWLF split the organizations into two factions. Eventually, there was a leadership change. Mason Wong was elected chair of the organization, and the ICSA officially joined the TWLF in Spring 1968.

Along with this leadership change came a radicalization of the organization. An example of this ideological shift was the founding of the Free University for Chinatown Kids, Unincorporated (FUCKU) initiative in November 1968, which was located in the ICSA youth center in Chinatown. This intentionally provocatively-named initiative was designed to bring together college and Chinatown kids. FUCKU organized speakers and discussions on the history of Chinese Americans. However, FUCKU failed at creating a new political ideology, in part because it focused on oppression in the Chinatown community specifically, instead of oppression as a larger institutional and social phenomenon. Instead, FUCKU was a meeting place for many Chinatown youth, in particular many youth in the Wah Ching, a group of under-employed Hong Kong immigrant youth.

Through the San Francisco State Strike Student Brochure, the ICSA issued a statement on its position on both the SFSC curriculum and on the state of Chinatown. They argued that the existing curriculum on the Chinese language was inadequate in addressing the challenges faced by the Chinese community. It stated:

S. F. State has a Chinese language department that isolates the “Chinese Experience” as a cultural phenomenon in language that 83% of the Chinese in the U. S. don’t speak. Realistically, we can expect that a Chinese woman living in the ghetto, who speaks Cantonese, cannot explain to the scholar that she is dying of tuberculosis because she speaks a “street language” while the scholar mutters a classical poetry in Mandarin. S. F. State does not teach Cantonese.

The ICSA also stated that “Chinatown is a ghetto” that was overpopulated, disease-ridden, and neglected by the city. In accord with the TWLF’s push for ethnic studies, the ICSA advocated for Chinese-American studies, stating that “there are no adequate courses in any department of school at S. F. State that even begin to deal with the problems of the Chinese people in their exclusionary and racist environment [in the United States].”

The organization also worked to create a new Chinese-American identity and to disrupt the traditional Chinese social order. They rejected traditional Chinese values and sought to create a new ethos to replace Confucian Protestant ideals of hard work and humility. The ICSA helped many members formulate a new identity and role within their communities. However, the ICSA did not completely reject more traditional Chinese ideals. For example, during the strike, members read Sun Tzu’s “The Art of War”, which contributed to the radicalization of the organization.

== Disputes with Chinatown Leadership ==
The ICSA rejected the traditional Chinatown leadership and establishment and pushed back against the landlords and power brokers in San Francisco Chinatown, in particular the Six Companies, who often were hostile towards youth groups and programs. The ICSA argued that the social order had to be disrupted in Chinatown to shift the power back to the working class.

The ICSA pushed back against the Chinatown establishment through a number of events and coalitions. On August 17, 1968, the ICSA organized an all-day convocation at the Cumberland Presbyterian Church followed by a march down the main street in Chinatown to voice their concern towards “education, employment, health, housing, youth, senior citizens, and immigration.” They purposefully marched during peak tourist hours to raise awareness of the issues affecting Chinatown. The event was denounced by the Chinatown Six Companies, but the event did not become violent.

Through the Concerned Chinese for Action and Change (CCAC), the ICSA pushed for material and institutional change in Chinatown, such as the establishment of a senior center and a youth center, and an investigation of the Chinatown-North Beach Equal Opportunity Commission office, who they viewed as not serving the needs of low-income residents.

The antagonism between the ICSA and the San Francisco Chinatown establishment also lead to a lawsuit. Foo Hum, a member of the Six Companies, denied that Chinatown had severe social and economic issues, and opening criticized the ICSA as “Communist activities." In response, the ISCA filed a slander suit for $110,000 in damages. Hum refused to settle out of court.
