= Amerasia Journal =

- Discipline: Asian American studies
- Language: English
- Edited by: David K. Yoo

Publication details
- History: 1971-present
- Publisher: Taylor & Francis on behalf of the Asian American Studies Center, University of California, Los Angeles (United States)
- Frequency: Triannually

Standard abbreviations
- ISO 4: Amerasia J.

Indexing
- CODEN: AMEJEZ
- ISSN: 0044-7471 (print); 1075-1300 (web)
- LCCN: 73642728
- OCLC no.: 746947524

Links
- Journal homepage; Journal page at publisher's website; Online access; Online archive

Amerasia Journal is a triannual peer-reviewed academic journal established in 1971 that covers Pacific Islander and Asian American studies. The journal regularly publishes special issues addressing particular themes.

== History ==
The Amerasia journal was established by editor-in-chief Lowell Chun-Hoon, publisher Don Nakanishi, and members of the Yale University Asian American Students Association. Chun-Hoon and Nakanishi were both seniors and members of Yale's Class of 1971, and the first issue was released in March of that same year. The journal was moved to the Asian American Studies Center at the University of California, Los Angeles, in July 1971, when Chun-Hoon became a staff member at the center. The journal was a joint publication of the center and the Yale Asian American Students Association until 1973, when it became solely owned by the center. The current editor-in-chief is David K. Yoo.

According to founding publisher Don T. Nakanishi, the journal "has benefited from and reflected a wide array of profound social changes that have occurred among Asian Americans and Pacific Islanders—be it their unprecedented growth and diversification, or their ever-increasing levels of access, representation, and achievement in American society's institutions and sectors that had long excluded, marginalized, or demonized them."
