= Black Student Union =

Organization of Black college students

- Abbreviation: BSU
- Predecessor: Negro Student Association
- Formation: March 1966
- Founders: Jerry Varnado; James Garrett
- Type: Student activist organization
- Purpose: Advocacy for Black students Black Power activism Demand for Black Studies and increased minority representation
- Affiliations: TWLF (1968–1969)

In higher education in the United States, a Black Student Union (BSU) is an organization of Black students, generally with a focus on protest. Historically functioning as a Black counterpart to the largely white organization Students for a Democratic Society, Black Student Unions advocated for changes on college campuses during the Black Power movement. According to Ibram X. Kendi, the existence of the academic field of Black studies is a direct result of advocacy by Black Student Unions.

== Background ==
In the 1960s, the passage of the Civil Rights Act of 1964 required a census of all postsecondary education institutions in the United States. The census identified students by race or ethnicity, revealing the low number of Black students attending predominantly white colleges and universities, and stated that federal funding would be withheld from educational institutions that did not meet the Act's equal opportunity requirements. The subsequent Higher Education Act of 1965 expanded the availability of financial aid to students seeking higher education, benefiting Black students more than any other group. Affirmative action programs at the campus level additionally increased Black enrollment at many colleges. African American college enrollment doubled between 1964 and 1970, with the greatest proportion of the increase occurring at predominantly white colleges and universities.

The admission of greater numbers of Black students by predominantly white colleges and universities did not equate to social acceptance of those Black students. Racial hostility toward Black students was common on college campuses, with white students and professors challenging their intellectual abilities and their right to attend college. In response, many Black students organized demonstrations to protest discriminatory policies at their schools, and worked to build academic and social support systems for themselves and other Black students at predominantly white colleges and universities.

This alienating environment, combined with the rise of the Black Power movement, influenced the creation of Black Student Unions on the campuses of predominantly white colleges and universities.

== History ==
The first Black Student Union began at San Francisco State College in March 1966, three months before Stokely Carmichael popularized the slogan "Black Power" and seven months before the Black Panther Party was founded. Initially founded in 1963 as the Negro Student Association, the group was transformed after the arrival of a former Freedom Rider named James Garrett, and the SF State Black Student Union became the inspiration for more than 1,000 other Black Student Unions (under various different names) across the United States. During the winter of 1968–1969, the organization led a student strike during which more than half of the 18,000 students at the college skipped classes to hold daily demonstrations. Over the next year, a Black Student Union presence was established at every California State University campus.

The concept spread north to the University of Washington, where a Black Student Union was founded in 1967. A BSU protest campaign successfully led to racial reforms within the university, and the group's broader organizing led to the formation of another BSU at Washington State University.

A Black Student Union was officially formed at Mills College in May 1968, claiming to be "first Black Student Union at a women's college in the West" and announcing an intent to "disrupt the activities of the college" unless the school hired two African American professors and a counselor.

== Effects ==
According to Ibram X. Kendi, the existence of the field of Black studies in higher education in the United States is a direct result of advocacy by Black Student Unions.
