= Third World Liberation Front strikes of 1968 =

Longest student strikes in American history; led to the rise of ethnic studies

- Part of Protests of 1968
- Date: 1968
- Location: San Francisco State University and University of California, Berkeley
- Goals: Education reform

The Third World Liberation Front (TWLF) rose in 1968 as a coalition of ethnic student groups on college campuses in California in response to the Eurocentric education and lack of diversity at San Francisco State College (now San Francisco State University) and University of California, Berkeley. The TWLF was instrumental in creating and establishing Ethnic Studies and other identity studies as majors in their respective schools and universities across the United States.

At the end of the American Civil Rights Movement, the combined determination of the Latin American Student Organization (LASO), the Black Student Union (BSU), the Intercollegiate Chinese for Social Action (ICSA), the Mexican American Student Confederation, the Philippine (now Pilipino) American Collegiate Endeavor (PACE), La Raza, the Native American Students Union, and later the Asian American Political Alliance galvanized California and the rest of the nation with the first student strike, bringing to light the need for wider perspective within educational disciplines. The TWLF strikes for Ethnic Studies in California drew the attention of the universities' administrative leaders as well as the attention of the Governor of California Ronald Reagan. The student strikes to establish these courses started in 1968 and lasted for several months. The establishment of the first College of Ethnic Studies at San Francisco State, the first Ethnic Studies Department at Berkeley, increased hiring of faculty of color, and efforts to increase minority representation on college campuses all resulted from the actions of the Third World Liberation Front.

== Black Student Union & Third World Liberation Front Strike at San Francisco State College ==
The student and faculty strike started on November 6, 1968 and lasted until March 21, 1969, making it the longest strike by students at an academic institution in the United States. The strikes arose to protest the perpetual Eurocentric lens on education, as the demands of the strikers included an establishment of an autonomous department for Ethnic Studies, more faculty of color representation, and more representation of students of color on campus. John H. Bunzel writes that the students felt that "education from kindergarten to college under the authority of the white community failed to focus on subject matter that was germane to the life experiences of the people in the minority community."

=== Origins ===
The contention between students and administration can be traced to May 2, 1967, when students orchestrated a sit-in at the office of the newly appointed president of the university, Dr. John Summerskill, in protest of the Selective Service Committee's access to students' academic standing. Subsequent events included the suspension and firing of high-profile educators of color. The Black Student Union, and The Black Communications Group, seeing the need of the other ethnic student groups to organize, led the Black student organizers to expedite the formation at San Francisco State College of the Third World Liberation Front.

One year to the day before the strike, the editor of the student newspaper The Daily Gator, James Vaszko, was attacked by several Black students on November 7, 1967. The "Gator incident", as it was called, occurred after he wrote an editorial petitioning the Carnegie Corporation of New York to withhold funds from proposed "service programs" including classes in Black history and culture requested by the Black Student Union. After six assailants were arrested and suspended, the BSU held a press conference in order to elucidate the reasons for the classes they advocated. These programs were to be established to "awaken and develop Black awareness and consciousness," according to the San Francisco Strike Collection. The rising tension between students prompted the formation of a faculty committee by President Summerskill. Individuals sympathetic to the six suspended students began protesting in the administration building at San Francisco State College, leading Summerskill to close the campus. During this period, there were also protests against the Vietnam War, further heightening tensions between the administration and students. On February 22, 1968, Dr. Summerskill resigned from his post as of the following school year, to be later replaced by Dr. Robert Smith.

As tension continued to rise, BSU & the Third World Liberation Front occupied the school's YMCA on March 23, 1968, forcing all YMCA employees to leave. Despite demands from President Summerskill to evacuate the premises, the students remained in protest to keep a revered faculty member as a professor. They listed their demands as:

1. An end to Air Force ROTC on campus,
2. Retention of Juan Martinez,
3. Programs to admit 400 ghetto students for the fall semester, and
4. The hiring of nine minority faculty members to support the minority students."

The protest culminated on May 21 of that year with the arrival of the police and arrests of 26 individuals of the 400 protesters.

The Students for a Democratic Society (SDS) played a significant role in the strike.

The fall of 1968 semester saw the formation of the Black Studies Department, but also mounting tension. President Smith refused a demand by the California State Colleges trustees to assign George Mason Murray (the Minister of Education for the Black Panther Party), a graduate student and instructor in the English department, to a non-teaching position. This came after Murray's remarks to students at Fresno State College where he allegedly said, "We are slaves, and the only way to become free is to kill all the slave masters." Mounting pressure from trustees and administrators, like SF State Chancellor Dumke, induced Dr. Smith to suspend Murray despite threats of a strike from the BSU, and led to the presentation of 15 demands from them and the TWLF.

=== Demands of the strikers and administrative response ===
From Helen Whitson's Introductory Essay in the San Francisco State College Strike Collection:

==== BSU demands ====
1. "That all Black Studies courses being taught through various departments be immediately part of the Black Studies Department and that all the instructors in this department receive full-time pay.
2. That Dr. Hare, Chairman of the Black Studies Department, receive a full-professorship and a comparable salary according to his qualifications.
3. That there be a Department of Black Studies which will grant a Bachelor's Degree in Black Studies; that the Black Studies Department chairman, faculty and staff have the sole power to hire faculty and control and determine the destiny of its department.
4. That all unused slots for Black Students from Fall 1968 under the Special Admissions program be filled in Spring 1969.
5. That all Black students wishing so, be admitted in Fall 1969.
6. That twenty (20) full-time teaching positions be allocated to the Department of Black Studies.
7. That Dr. Helen Bedesem be replaced from the position of Financial Aid Officer and that a Black person be hired to direct it; that Third World people have the power to determine how it will be administered.
8. That no disciplinary action will be administered in any way to any students, workers, teachers, or administrators during and after the strike as a consequence of their participation in the strike.
9. That the California State College Trustees not be allowed to dissolve any Black programs on or off the San Francisco State College campus.
10. That George Murray maintain his teaching position on campus for the 1968-69 academic year."

==== TWLF demands ====
1. "That a School of Ethnic Studies for the ethnic groups involved in the Third World be set up with the students in each particular ethnic organization having the authority and control of the hiring and retention of any faculty member, director, or administrator, as well as the curriculum in a specific area study.
2. That 50 faculty positions be appropriated to the School of Ethnic Studies, 20 of which would be for the Black Studies program.
3. That, in the Spring semester, the College fulfills its commitment to non-white students in admitting those who apply.
4. That, in the fall of 1969, all applications of non-white students be accepted.
5. That George Murray and any other faculty person chosen by non-white people as their teacher be retained in their positions."

The BSU/TWLF strike that began on November 6, 1968 was catalyzed by the suspension of graduate student and Black Panther Minister of Education George Mason Murray. There was an approximate 15% reduction in student attendance in November at the start of the strike, but police were called to campus anyway on that first day. Police brutality was a common sight throughout the strike. From that moment on, these students would remain on strike for 5 months until March 21, 1969.

Negative and violent interactions between police and students lead Dr. Smith to close campus for a week and faculty meetings ensued. Appeals by Professor S. I. Hayakawa to support President Smith's request to reinstate Murray were made to the faculty members, who were also considering striking as well. It was highlighted that Murray was "suspended without due process" by a faculty grievance committee. When campus reopened on November 20, 1968, only 10% of students returned for the school-wide discussion on current state of affairs. After disagreeable interactions with students, Dr. Smith resigned on November 26, and Professor Hayakawa became acting president. On December 11, the campus American Federation of Teachers (AFT) also join the strike to have trustees meet eye to eye with the students.

On January 6, 1969, acting President Hayakawa ordered that there shall be no more gatherings at the center of campus. Yet, two days later, campus AFT members and students continued to strike on campus. Despite many judicial actions to order AFT members and students to disband, striking continued. On February 29, it was decided that Murray, along with the Black Studies Department Chair, would not be rehired, further perpetuating the desire to strike. After another month of violence and striking, on March 20, 1969, the TWLF, BSU, and members of the selection committee of San Francisco State College came to an agreement, ending the strike the following day.

Protest Tactics

The students at San Francisco State College employed many different striking techniques. Firstly, they used walkouts and relied on word of mouth, interrupting classrooms and saying class was canceled because of the strike. Additionally, they held rallies on campus almost every day. Power in numbers was extremely impactful as well, with TWLF bringing multiple groups of people of color together to fight for their goals.

==== Outcomes of the strike ====
Whitson's essay for the San Francisco State College Strike Collection highlights and tabulates the demands and their outcomes during the agreement of March 20, 1968. File:Outcomes of the TWLF Strike at SFSU in 1968.pdf

As of 2012, San Francisco State University holds an annual Ethnic Studies Conference, inviting high school students to engage with and understand what ethnic studies is and the reasons for its establishment.

== TWLF strike at University of California, Berkeley ==
The University of California, Berkeley housed an establishment of the Third World Liberation Front and saw the second longest student strike in US history for reasons similar to that of the TWLF at San Francisco State College: to address the Eurocentric education and integrate into academia conversations about identity and oppression. Although the Berkeley strike started on January 22, 1969, several months after the San Francisco strike, unrest on campus existed long before. On June 30, 1968, the Mayor of Berkeley, California Wallace Johnson issued a curfew for three days after declaring a state of emergency due to protesting students in support of the student and worker strikes in Paris, France in May of that year. In February 1969, 13 students, including leaders of the movement Manuel Ruben Delgado, Ysidro Macias, and LaNada Means, were arrested for their part in the demonstrations and suspended.

The TWLF strike at Berkeley proved to be more violent than that which was at SF State College, with a greater incidence of police brutality against students, striking members of the American Federation of Teachers, and campus workers who decided to strike. The strikers also drew support from several university faculty members. Students and faculty members not in direct support of the TWLF protested the police presence on campus. The violence escalated to a point at which Governor Ronald Reagan had to declare a "state of extreme emergency," while the Berkeley President decided to prohibit demonstrations on campus. Incensed students continued to strike, and tear gas was exchanged between the National Guard and the striking students. Their efforts resulted in the first Ethnic Studies Department in the United States on March 7, 1969, closely followed by the creation of the first College of Ethnic Studies in the US at San Francisco State on March 20.

=== Origin ===
In April 1968, the Afro-American Studies Union (AASU) at University of California, Berkeley submitted a proposal to institute a Black Studies Program. The proposal was passed around the administration, from Chancellor Roger Heyn to professors to the Dean of the College of Letters and Sciences, Walker Knight. In December, when a committee was assembled to discuss the students' proposal without a student representative, no conclusion could be made as to whether or not a Black Studies should be a program within a larger department or a department itself.

In August, the Mexican-American Student Confederation (MASC) to ask the university to withhold the purchase of table grapes in support of striking farm workers. The university agreed to boycott the grapes. Yet, Governor Reagan and his Agricultural Secretary Earl Coke spoke out against the school's decision to boycott the table grapes. President Hitch forced the school to resume the purchase of table grapes, and eleven MASC students were arrested for trespassing and unlawful assembly when trying to meet with President Charles J. Hitch.

=== Events of the UCB Strike ===
In January 1969, the AASU, MASC, the Native American Student Association and the Asian-American Political Alliance coalesced to form Berkeley's Third World Liberation Front, with the establishment of a Strike Support Committee. The demands were as follows: "1. Establishment of a Third World College with four departments; 2. Minority persons be appointed to administrative, faculty, and staff positions at all levels in all campus units; 3. Additional demands included Admission, financial aid, and academic assistance for minority students; Work-study positions for minority students in minority communities and on high school campuses; 4. Minorities be allowed to control all minority-related programs on campus; 5. No disciplinary action against student strikers." The LA Times chronicled the events of the strike:

"The deputies moved in again and tried to arrest Delgado. He resisted and was clubbed to the ground. Strikers began swinging and screaming at the deputies, who retaliated with blows from their clubs. Macias briefly escaped officers pursuing him but was cornered when he resisted. Both strike leaders were taken into Sproul Hall, apparently unconscious. Four others were arrested in the schuffle (sic). The striking students reformed at Bancroft-Telegraph and clinked arms again. About 30 California Highway Patrolmen formed a wedge and charged into the crowd, chasing the students into the streets."

By March 3, over 150 students were arrested and 36 were suspended. However, five days later, Chancellor Heyns and President Hitch conceded to most of the demands of the TWLF, which included the establishment of the Department of Ethnic Studies.

== Origin of the name TWLF ==
Students at the campuses of San Francisco State University and UC Berkeley joined together in 1968 and 1969 and created the name Third World Liberation Front in relation to the Third World Liberation struggles. The students understood the similarities between the two and "recognizing their task as one of decolonization in a US context." The students understood these struggles in terms of education and wanted to embody the Third World Liberation into these campuses by a "Third World College."
