= Third World Liberation Front =

Coalition of student societies in California best known as the founders of ethnic studies

- Abbreviation: TWLF
- Founded: November 1968 (San Francisco State University); January 1969 (University of California, Berkeley)
- Dissolved: March 1969 (end of major strikes)
- Ideology: Third Worldism; Anti-imperialism; Anti-racism; Student rights
- Political position: Far-left
- Member organizations: BSU; AAPA; MASC; PACE; LASO; NASU; El Renacimiento; ICSA

In 1968, the Third World Liberation Front (TWLF), a coalition of the Black Students Union, the Native Students Room, the Latin American Students Organization, the Filipino American Collegiate Endeavor (PACE) the Filipino-American Students Organization, the Asian American Political Alliance, and El Renacimiento, a Mexican-American student organization, formed at San Francisco State University (SFSU) to call for campus reform. Another Third World Liberation Front was formed at University of California, Berkeley in January 1969. These coalitions initiated and sustained the Third World Liberation Front strikes of 1968, one of the longest student strikes in US history.

== Student actions in 1967 ==
Various student actions began in June of the 1967–1968 school year when students protested the administration's decision to provide students' academic standing to the Selective Service Office in June 1967. When students returned from summer break, tensions escalated. On November 6, 1967, James Vasko, editor of student newspaper The Daily Gator, was assaulted by black students who were offended by the content and tone of one of his articles. Students began to protest both the changes the students were facing and the Vietnam war. As a result of the campus unrest, Dr. John Summerskill, the president of the college, resigned in February 1968, effective in September. On March 23, 1968, the TWLF occupied the YMCA office on campus and evicted the YMCA. Student actions continued throughout May, calling for an end to Air-Force ROTC on campus, the admission of 400 students in the fall semester, and the hiring of nine minority faculty members to help the minority students. 26 people were arrested.

== 1968–1969 school year ==
In June 1968, Dr. Robert Smith was hired to replace Summerskill as the President of San Francisco State College. In the following September, George Mason Murray, a graduate student in English and Black Panther Minister of Education, was hired as a teaching assistant to teach special introductory English classes for 400 special students admitted to the college. President Smith also announced the creation of a Black Studies Department and named Professor of Sociology, Dr. Nathan Hare, Acting Chair. At the end of the month, California State College Trustees voted to ask President Smith to reassign George Murray to a non-teaching position after he reportedly made controversial statements at Fresno State College and at San Francisco State. President Smith refused.

=== October ===
On 31 October, Chancellor Glenn Dumke ordered President Smith to suspend Murray. The BSU proposed a strike on November 6 if Murray was suspended, and presented their 15 demands. The next day, 1 November, President Smith suspended George Murray.

=== November ===
On 6 November, exactly a year after the Daily Gator incident, the Black Students Union and Third World Liberation Front members struck for a larger Black Studies Program and for the reinstatement of George Murray. Administration called police after students marched on the Administration Building. The campus closed during the week of 13 November, due to the escalating number of student-police confrontations. Governor Ronald Reagan and school trustees called for the reopening of campus on November 18, 1968. Additionally, a faculty grievance committee reported back that George Murray was suspended without due process. On 20 November, approximately 10% of the students returned to campus for departmental discussions. The administration had also created a Convocation to discuss the protests, which continued throughout the 26th. During this time, President Smith resigned, and his position was filled by Dr. S. I. Hayakawa, whose first official act was to keep the campus closed.

=== December ===
When the campus was reopened on 2 December, students resumed striking at the corner of 19th and Holloway Avenues, urging students to continue the strike and not attend classes. However, President Hayakawa climbed on top of the truck and disconnected the wires from the speakers. Later in December, on the 11th, more than 50 American Federation of Teachers members set up an informational picket line around the campus, to pressure the Trustees to negotiate with the students. Two days later, the campus closed for the winter holidays, one week earlier than usual.

=== January ===
When school resumed on 6 January 1969, actions by teachers and students continued, including more pickets and a "book-in," where students took books from around a library and placed them back at the Circulation Desk to clog library functions. In a 16 January interview with KQED, Ronald Reagan called the protesters, "a dissident faction of outright lawbreakers and anarchists." On January 24, the New York Times reported that 380 protesters were arrested on campus.

=== February ===
On 4 February 1969, Judge Henry Rolph of San Francisco Superior Court ordered the San Francisco State AFT local to end the strike. Nathan Hare and George Mason Murray were both not rehired for the second year and strikes continued.

=== March ===
Finally, on March 20, 1969, representatives of the TWLF, the Black Students Union, and the members of the Select Committee signed an agreement concerning the resolution of the fifteen demands and other issues arising from the student strike, and the strike officially ended on the 21st.

== The Ten BSU Demands ==
1. That all Black Studies courses being taught through various other departments be immediately made part of the Black Studies Department, and that all the instructors in this department receive full-time pay.
2. That Dr. Nathan Hare, Chairman of the Black Studies Department, receive a full professorship and a comparable salary according to his qualifications.
3. That there be a Department of Black Studies which will grant a Bachelor's Degree in Black Studies; that the Black Studies Department, the chairman, faculty, and staff have the sole power to hire faculty and control and determine the destiny of its department.
4. That all unused slots for black students from Fall, 1968 under the Special Admissions Program be filled in Spring, 1969.
5. That all black students wishing so be admitted in Fall, 1969.
6. That twenty (20) full-time teaching positions be allocated to the Department of Black Studies.
7. That Dr. Helen Bedesem be replaced from the position of Financial Aids Officer, and that a black person be hired to direct it, that Third World people have the power to determine how it will be administered.
8. That no disciplinary action will be administered in any way to any students, workers, teachers, or administrators during and after the strike as a consequence of their participation in the strike.
9. That the California State College Trustees not be allowed to dissolve the black programs on or off the San Francisco State College campus.
10. That George Murray maintain his teaching position on campus for the 1968-69 academic year.

== The Five TWLF Demands ==
Sources:

1. That a school of Ethnic Studies for the ethnic groups involved in the Third World be set up with the students in each particular ethnic organization having the authority and control of the hiring and retention of any faculty member, director and administrator, as well as the curriculum in a specific area study.
2. That fifty (50) faculty positions be appropriated to the School of Ethnic Studies, 20 of which would be for the Black Studies Program.
3. That in the Spring Semester, the college fulfill its commitment to the non-white students in admitting those that apply.
4. That to the Fall of 1969, all applications of non-white students accepted.
5. That George Murray, and any other faculty person chosen by non-white people as their teacher, be retained in their position.

== Third World Liberation Front at Berkeley ==
The Afro-American Student Union submitted a proposal for a Black Studies Department at UC Berkeley in April 1968. After months of negotiations, the AASU became frustrated and joined with other Third World students to demand a Third World College. Chicano, Asian American, and Native American students were also organizing during the fall of 1968. They also organized in solidarity with the San Francisco State College TWLF strike.

On January 22, 1969, the Afro-American Studies Union, the Mexican-American Student Confederation (MASC), the Native American Student Alliance (NASA), and the Asian American Political Alliance (AAPA) coalesced to form the Third World Liberation Front at UC Berkeley. The demands were as follows: "1. Establishment of a Third World College with four departments; 2. Minority persons be appointed to administrative, faculty, and staff positions at all levels in all campus units; 3. Additional demands included admission, financial aid, and academic assistance for minority students; Work-study positions for minority students in minority communities and on high school campuses; 4. Minorities be allowed to control all minority-related programs on campus; 5. No disciplinary action against student strikers." The strike was met with violent opposition with the police using tear gas and beating protesters. Chancellor Heyns declared that "Sather Gate will be kept open by any means necessary" and a "state of emergency" was called on February 4, 1969, which resulted in the presence of the national guard on campus for the first time. After ten weeks of struggle, the academic senate voted 550 to 4 to establish an interim Department of Ethnic Studies pending further negotiations for a Third World College. Even though UC Berkeley's TWLF called a moratorium on strike activities, they were adamant about their goal of winning a Third World College.

The Third World Liberation Front (TWLF) was revived in 1999 at U.C. with a multiracial coalition of students organizing a hunger strike to push for more money for ethnic studies programs following a budget cut that resulted in the cutting of many Ethnic Studies courses. The TWLF organized a ten-hour-long occupation of Barrows Hall and presented eight demands to the university administration seeking to expand ethnic studies. Six students were involved in a hunger strike outside of California Hall while students set up a twenty-four-hour camp drawing hundreds of supporters every day. The Ethnic Studies faculty, including Professor Ron Takaki, Professor Carlos Munoz, and Professor Elaine Kim, joined in supporting the students. On the fourth night of the hunger strike, the University of California Police Department raided the camp and arrested eighty-three protesters. After eight days, the university administration agreed to seven of the eight student demands, and conditionally to the eighth demand. The strike resulted in the creation of the Multicultural Community Center, the Center for Race and Gender, and more faculty hires in the Department of Ethnic Studies.
