= Filipino American fashion =

Fashion and clothing of Filipino-Americans

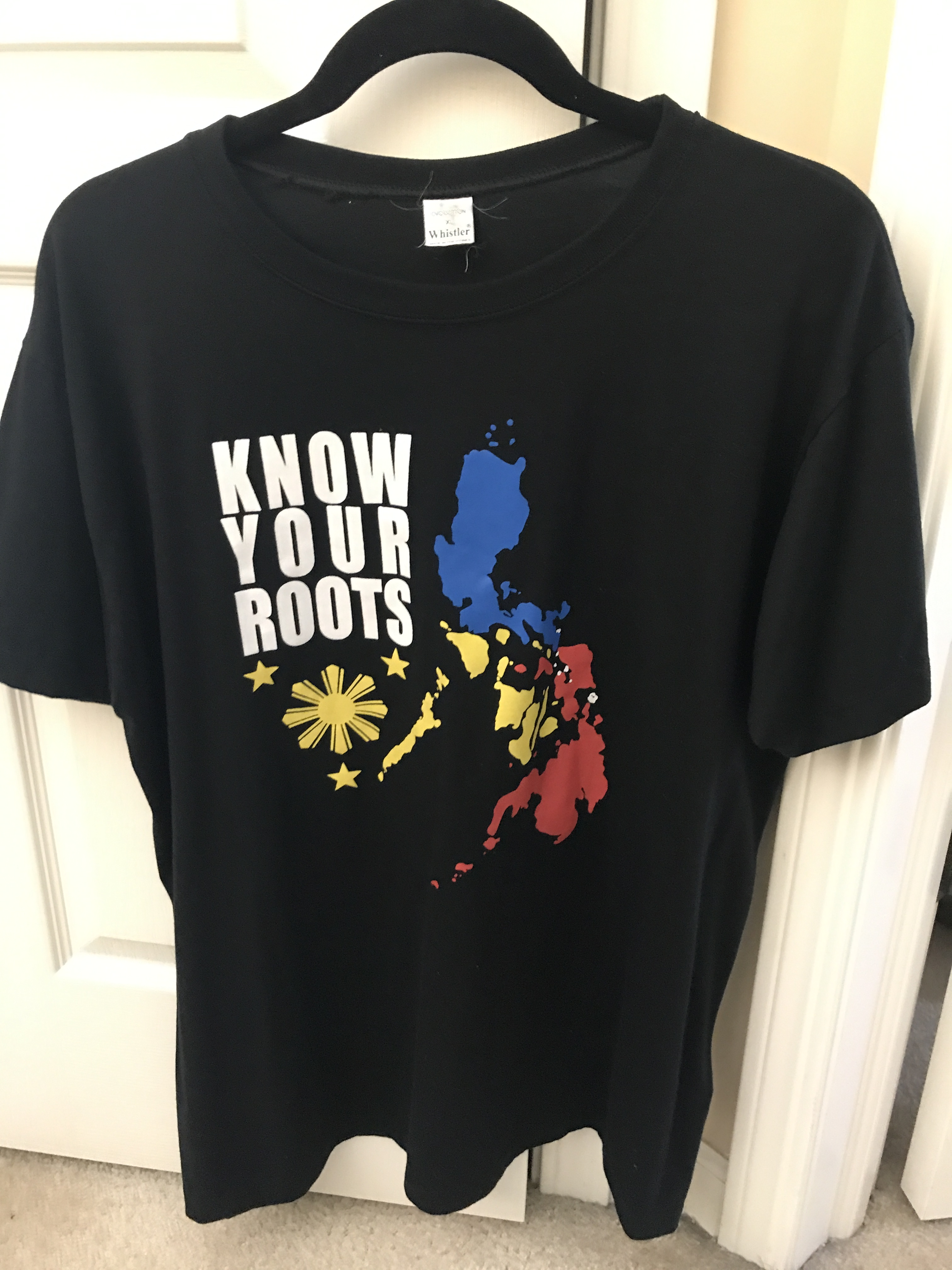
An example of a Filipino-American clothing brand.

Fashion and clothing for Filipino-Americans has been a symbol of political action since their arrival to the U.S. in the early 20th century. Dealing with U.S. occupation in the Philippines, both students and laborers adopted American styles of dress while also maintaining styles of dress that originated in the Philippines. Fashion remains an integral aspect for the Filipino-American community, with many cultural celebrations regarding fashion such as Canada Philippine Fashion Week in Toronto and other fashion weeks occurring in numerous global cities. Aside from partaking in fashion, the Philippines also produces clothing that is made for mass consumption overseas, in places such as the U.S., Europe, and Canada.

== History ==
=== American colonial period ===
The pensionandos were a group of students sent to the U.S. for the purpose of gaining an education from an American university, with the hopes that these students could go back home to contribute to Filipino society. Starting in 1901, the pensionado program allowed for Filipino students to gain an education from an American university; unlike the “Manong” generation, there were a significant number of Filipina women in the program. The Philippines was under U.S. colonial rule during the time the pensionado program was first put into place. American teachers in the Philippines encouraged Filipino students back home to adopt American styles of fashion and clothing and leave behind traditional Filipino garments. In the 1920s, the camisa (blouse) and the saya (skirt) were used in conjunction to form what is known as the terno. The terno is alternatively referred to as the Maria Clara gown. The inspiration for the terno came about due to American evening gowns more utilitarian, with diminished skirts and sleeves. The terno was commonly worn among Filipina students as a replacement to the camisa. The perception was that traditional Filipino clothing such as the camisa were cumbersome and inconvenient for daily use. Because of this, American clothing became the standard for everyday wear in Filipino society. Physical education class in the Filipino curriculum was pivotal for this change. It allowed specifically for women to dress in non-traditional Filipino clothing and in athletic wear that was fashionable in the United States.

Many Filipina women struggled with wearing both American and Filipino clothing. For Filipina women, it was a common belief among Filipino society that they were gatekeepers of Filipino culture. Filipina women had the dilemma of adopting the new American style of clothing while keeping old, traditional Filipino garments intact and in fashion. Filipinos who did not wear American clothes were looked down upon for not being able to become accustomed to American culture. However, Filipinos who did wear American clothing were believed to not be “Filipino” enough.

In the U.S., the 1904 World’s Fair (also known as the Louisiana Purchase Exposition) had an exhibit of Filipinos dressed as the Igorot tribe. This led to the mistaken portrayal of Filipinos as solely representative of the Igorot people. Filipino students looked to dispel the stereotypes of the Igorot tribe by dressing in American style clothing. Throughout the course of the week, Filipina women were allowed to either dress in American clothes or Filipino clothes. Filipina students often alternated between the two styles of dress. For the purposes of work and study, Filipina students decided to wear American clothing. On other occasions such as special events, Filipina students opted for traditional Filipino clothing. Garments such as the terno were often worn for such special events. The wearing of the terno was interpreted as a patriotic thing to do, showing pride in Filipino culture. For male pensionados, their styles of clothing differed from the “Manong” generation. Male Filipino students eschewed suits and ties and opted to wear hats instead, in order to differ themselves from the negative stereotypes surrounding individuals belonging to the Manong generation. For some male Filipino students, more money was spent on clothing and material possessions than their education and food.

=== The “Manong” Generation ===
The early influx of Filipinos into the United States was in large part due to social programs such as the pensionando program and the necessity for labor in certain areas such as California and Alaska. Laborers and farmers who migrated from the Philippines were known as the "Manong" Generation, an Ilocano term referring to an elderly person. Filipino migrant workers began coming to the U.S. around the start of the 20th century; they were mostly men who worked in either California or Alaska. Some had worked in the sugar plantations of Hawaii as well, but this occurred before Hawaii became a state. These men were referred to as the “Manong” generation, which is an Ilocano term designated for elderly people. For many Filipino laborers and workers during this time period, there was an emphasis on dressing well. This happened for multiple reasons. First, Filipino laborers looked to disassociate themselves from lower class citizens. Another reason included the desire to emulate Hollywood actors during the 1920s and 1930s. Filipinos were unable to rent or own homes in cities such as Los Angeles, so they spent their money on other things such as clothing. In living spaces, Filipinos were confined to upwards of fifteen to twenty tenants in a single room to save money. This allowed for Filipinos to spend their money on clothing instead of rent and other possessions instead. Also, Filipinos were portrayed as weak, submissive, unassertive, and eager to please; dressing well was perceived to counter those stereotypes. Despite earning meager wages, Filipino laborers bought nice clothing as a means to appear nicer than their pay would suggest. Lastly, another reason for the desire to dress well was to impress relatives back in the Philippines. Filipino laborers sent pictures of themselves in their suits in order to give them the impression they were quite successful in America.

==== Zoot Suits ====
The suits that were worn by Filipinos were known as “zoot suits”, prominent in cities such as Los Angeles and Stockton. Zoot suits were originally worn by Mexican-Americans and African-Americans, but eventually Filipino-Americans wore them. Because Filipinos lived in the same neighborhoods as Mexican-Americans, the likelihood that Filipinos adopted this specific style of dress from Mexican-Americans was high. Zoot suits had a distinct appearance; they had loud and vivid colors, lengthy jackets, and sat slightly above the waist while tapering off down the leg of the respective pant. What became known as the “McIntosh Suit” was a regional term in southern California for a suit that was one’s personal best. The most popular MacIntosh suits featured gray colors with blue pinstripes constructed of gabardine material and wool material for winter suits.

Wearers of the zoot suits had different reasons for wearing them. Filipino men dressed in zoot suits sought to challenge their socioeconomic status in the United States. Instead of proving stereotypes true, Filipino men wanted to appeal to the masculinity portrayed by Hollywood stars in the 1920s and 1930s. Having multiple girlfriends and mistresses was common and even encouraged among these men. As mentioned earlier, Filipinos sent photographs of themselves donning suits to give the impression to their families back home that they were successful. These photographs encouraged other Filipino men to come to the United States in order to fulfill the “American Dream”. Filipinos wore suits for numerous occasions, such as going out to the pool rooms, gambling houses, dance clubs, and night clubs with the intention of attracting women of other races and ethnicities such as Mexican-American women and Caucasian women. This often caused physical confrontations among Caucasian men. Those who donned the zoot suit were seen as devious. Los Angeles public officials and social agencies look to combat the growing number of Mexican, Filipino, and African-American youths by instituting restrictive policies such as curfews and civic group activities.

Members of Filipino associations such as the Filipino Federation of America (known shorthand as FFA) also wore McIntosh suits and zoot suits. Whether plantation worker or a FFA member, nearly all Filipino men donned suits. FFA’s reasoning for wearing suits was to portray Filipinos as model citizens, along with their perceived moral values, in contrast to the perception of Mexican-Americans and African-Americans at that time. The insistence of dressing well among Filipino men changed their perceptions in the media, as Filipino men were believed to be well dressed. Filipino men were even displayed in national advertisements because of this belief. There were believed to be two types of well-dressed Filipinos; the former being those who consistently went to gambling joints and dance clubs and the latter being individuals who remained abstinent and stayed out of trouble. Fashion for the “Manong” generation was a means to dispel stereotypes and create new identities in America. The main goal was to gain acceptance in American society, specifically among Caucasians.

=== Recent Developments ===
In Los Angeles, clothing is an important marker for Filipino street gangs and gang members. After 1965, Los Angeles became one of the largest cities of Filipino immigrants which saw a massive migration of Filipino youth. To combat Mexican gang members, Filipino gangs arose. The Satana gang fused styles of the Philippines with those of other fashions, particularly cholo fashion among the Latino neighborhoods of Los Angeles. Satana members used the cholo style of dress as inspiration, as well as the jefrox style popularized in Manila. The jefrox style was typically associated with counterculture elements such as long hair and Rock and roll music. The hybrid of both jefrox and cholo styles resulted in brushed hair, the use of nets and bandanas, open toed sandals, and loose fitting shirts. Some Satana members preferred wearing khakis with significant creases as an homage to the Manong generation of the 1920s and 1930s. These khakis were deliberately worn to showcase the unity that the younger generations had with the Filipino laborers of the 1930s who originally came to California. By the eighties and nineties, Filipino gang members quickly adopted the cholo style of Latino youth. Satana gang members wore loose fitting, baggy pants that were fully black in conjunction with white T-shirts and pendletons. Styles of dress varied, however, even among gangs. The Satana homeboys of the mid-Wilshire and Temple areas of Los Angeles were Filipinos from all economic backgrounds, from lower class to upper-class families. Members from a wealthier background were easily identifiable, as they wore luxury clothes reminiscent of the “Manong” generation. Overall, men and women sought to wear brand name clothing such as Tommy Hilfiger and Nautica, who had significant presence in the hip-hop fashion community in the nineties. Filipino men chose to wore ill-fitting clothes while Filipina women chose to wear more revealing clothing. Items such as clothing played a role in how Filipino youth identified themselves, especially in inner city areas.

Fashion shows that are central to Filipino culture take place in many global cities such as Paris, Toronto, Manila, New York City, and Milan. An example of such would be the Canada Philippine Week in Toronto. Canada Fashion Philippine Week, otherwise known as CFPW, is connected to many other cultural celebrations in Toronto. It attracts fashion consumers of all social classes, whether lower, middle, or upper class. The CPFW itself is a cultural event, featuring a lot of Filipino and non-Filipino food and multicultural exchanges. There is a large presence of Filipino fashion designers in the fashion industry. Notable ones include Monique Lhuillier and Josie Natori whose high end clothing and garments are similar to those showcased in fashion shows and events such as CFPW. CFPW is in a similar vein to Philippine Fashion Week, which is hosted in Manila.

== Production ==
The Philippines is a site of production for many clothing brands sold overseas. Rene Ofreneo states the presence of the Philippines in manufacturing clothing and garments has waned in recent years. Ofreneo notes in the 1990s, the production of clothing led to the fashion industry employing the largest number of Filipino employees, while also being the second biggest export of the country. He later signifies in 1995, eighty percent of the garments produced by the Philippines ended up being sold to either the U.S., Europe (specifically the European Union) and Canada. The growth of the clothing manufacturing industry in the Philippines was aided by the Multi Fibre Arrangement, otherwise known as MFA, enacted in 1975 and ending in 2004. The arrangement instituted quotas on developing countries regarding the amount of textiles and garments they could export. Since its expiration, the number of goods sent to the USA and other countries has decreased. The number of workers in the textile industry has decreased by a great amount, employing 1,000,000 workers in the early 1990s to only 100,000 as of 2010. There are numerous complications in the legislative process that have caused a great deal of stress for Philippine manufacturers and the economy of the Philippines as a whole.

The difference in production costs between the Philippines and other manufacturing countries such as China are a huge factor in the decline of the textile industry in the Philippines. A Manila-based company selling materials and clothing to the Gap brand costs up to fifty cents more in production costs compared to if the garment was manufactured in China. Many of the former Filipino workers in the textile industry left to work in other manufacturing or service industries. Some workers decided to focus on making clothes, garments, and textiles for domestic markets, although the instability of these markets has weakened their potential income. As for supervisors and factory managers, some have found employment in other countries such as Bangladesh and Sri Lanka where there is a need for supervisors and factory managers. Government initiatives such as the Save Our Industries Act offer potential solutions to the failing industry, such as sending American textiles to the Philippines and repurposing them as garments made from the Philippines, but also has many uncertainties as the bill lacks bipartisan support within the U.S. Congress.

== See also ==
- Filipino Americans
- Overseas Filipinos
- Filipino diaspora
- Fashion and clothing in the Philippines
- Philippines
