= Filipino American music =

Filipino Americans have a long history of music in the United States. The Philippines have musical context and varied influences due to indigenous traditions and early colonial influences of Spanish and American occupation. During occupation by the United States, many Filipinos were recruited for manual labor along the West Coast. These early laborers commonly would perform Spanish-influenced rondallas as well as choral groups. With many Filipinos living in the United States beginning around the 1900s, Filipinos have contributed towards early Americana staples such as blues and jazz, and continue to influence more modern contemporary genres such as hip hop and rock. American music has also been influential in the Philippines for artists and vice versa. Though contributing to the evolution of American music, large number of Filipino Americans have a strong identity with culture of the Philippines by participating or organizing traditional dances and musical performances, largely in the form of PCNs on university campuses. Traditional dances and musical performances commonly practiced in the US are rondallas, choral groups, and gong chime ensembles. College campuses often organize performances on campuses, but can also have characteristics unique to America, as many Filipino Americans want to share their experiences of living in America and perform a more neo-traditional variation of traditional performances.

== Early American perceptions of Filipino music ==
=== St. Louis World's Fair 1904 ===
The Louisiana Purchase Exposition, also known as the 1904 St. Louis World's Fair, had themes of race through the scope of a Eurocentrism viewpoint similarly to previous World's fairs such as the World's Columbian Exposition in Chicago. Among the attractions was an exhibition of life in the Philippines, which majority of the audience members were European descendant attendees who had never seen Filipinos before. The fair's contributors had only offered a distorted view of Filipinos. Due to heavy justification of American colonization, Filipinos were featured with tribal or “savage” type of imagery in the form of Filipino dress, culture, and music. Musicologist Frances Densmore attended the fair for the purpose of analyzing Filipino music. Densmore, who also studied Native American music, revered the music as “primitive” and used social sciences as well as European-American colonization ideas towards racialization of music. Music of European origin performed by brass bands like the Philippine Constabulary Band that emerged from a centuries-old band tradition in the Philippines were ignored in order to maintain a colonialist view of Filipinos as uncivilized.

Pensionados through the newly initiated U.S. governmental educational program who attended the fair wrote criticizing songs conflicting with the actual presentation. Some pensionados including Jorge Bocobo who was studying at the Indiana University at the time wrote music or songs about the experiences at the fair. In excerpt of Bocobo's piece about the experience “In St. Louis we enjoyed the Pike, With spectacles we did like, As guides in the Philippine Exhibits, Where we were thought to be Igorots, We had fits.” The irony in Borobo's song is of United States college-bound Filipinos witnessing a Filipino exhibition that describes Filipino culture to that of Igorots.

== Famous Filipino American singers ==
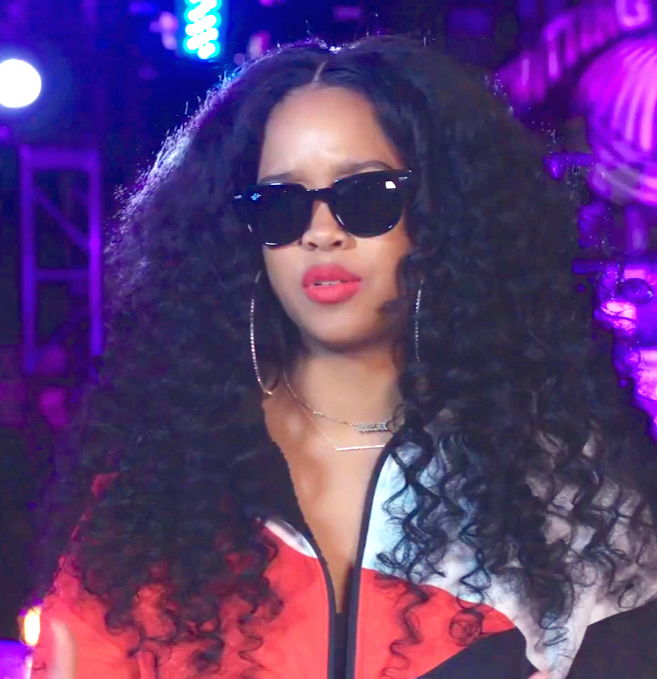
H.E.R. is Filipino

- Gabriella Sarmiento Wilson, known professionally as H.E.R., is an academy-and-Grammy Award-winning singer born to a Filipino American mother. Additionally, members of her mother's extended family were guitarists, drummers and bassists, as well as vocalists, often playing for karaoke events.
- Olivia Rodrigo is Filipino. Her paternal grandfather was born in the Philippines, and her family follows Filipino tradition and cuisine.
- Nicole Prascovia Elikolani Valiente, who later changed her name to Nicole Scherzinger, used to be the lead singer for The Pussycat Dolls.
- Bruno Mars. His mother was born in the Philippines.
- Vanessa Anne Hudgens. Her mother was born in Mindanao.

== Traditional Filipino American music ==
Unlike other Asian Americans traditional music, Filipino Americans can offer much improvisation and amateur or part-time performances.

=== Rondalla ===
To many Filipinos, manong means male relative or often "older brother" and usually use the term to describe the first wave of working immigrants from the Philippines. Manong in the United States were generally all male. Between 1900 and 1930, over 100,000 Filipinos were recruited to America to work mainly in canneries and agricultural jobs, with many entering metropolitan areas in the mainland to find work as menial laborers. The majority of the work of the manongs was on the West Coast and Hawaii, working on sugar cane fields and various plantations while living in migrant labor camps. Due to the previous Spanish colonization of the Philippines, Filipinos have a version of the originally Spanish rondalla, which was popular among the manongs in the United States migrant labor camps. These folk ballads were usually sung by the manongs in camps and were often with conjunction of guitar or banjo.

The rondalla is still heavily practiced and popular form of traditional music ensemble for Filipino Americans to participate in on college campuses and dance groups. Rondallas in the United States may be accompanied by vocal ensembles as well.

Notable Filipino American rondalla ensembles in the past is the Philippine-American Society and Cultural Arts Troupe which started in San Diego, California, in 1970. The group as of 2017 still continues to involve rondallas, usually in combination or with collaboration of voice ensembles into their performances. The Samahan dance company, which started in 1974 in El Cajon, California, also performs rondollas. Samahan, which later changed to Samahan Filipino American Performing Arts & Education Center in 1998, and previously had combined with the Philippine-American Society and Cultural Arts Troupe under the direction of Bayani de Leon to create the Magandang Pilipinas Rondalla group, a rondalla that involved Pascat Vocal Ensemble.

=== Choral groups ===
In the United States traditional choral or vocal ensembles are still present, usually used in the performance of Philippine folk songs, and can vary in different Filipino languages. Certain choral or vocal ensembles have funding by the federal National Endowment for the Arts. It is very common for groups to dismantle, and form under different names and even directors. Choral groups can be used to

=== Traditional gong-chime ensembles ===
Thanks to increases of particular availability of certain instruments as while as increased knowledgeable musicians, gong-chime ensembles have seen increased interest in the United States and particularly that of the Kulintang ensemble. The Bayanihan Dance Troupe during the 1960s exposed the particular instruments of the kulintang to many Filipino-Americans in the 1960s. The Bayanihan Dance Troupe also have created a blueprint or creation of music as a document for some ensembles, including the Philippine Dance Company of Chicago, while other ensembles use gong-chime to accompany dance, or have improvisational creative process like that of other groups in the neo-traditional category.

The original history of the kulintang ensemble originates from the Maritime Southeast Asia region, and primary including the southern areas of the Philippines, which was majority Muslim. Characteristics of the Kulintang ensemble use in Filipino practices include a virtuosic and codified system of improvisation. Because gong-chime ensembles or kulintang it is neither influenced by colonialism of Spanish or the United States occupation, especially since it originated in the Muslim region of the Philippines which is contrary to the Catholicism influence of Spain, many Filipinos have taken interest in the form, seeing it as a true form of Filipino identity or relation to other Asian cultures. Due to Filipino identities heavily tied into kulinatang, membership unlike groups on university campuses is mostly by individuals who are Filipino identifying members.

Notable previous gong-chime ensembles include the Philippine Dance Company of Chicago, Kalilang of San Francisco, and Amauan of New York City.

=== Neo-traditional styles of music ===
Neo-traditional can be used to describe the musical and performance style influenced by Filipino Americans and Asian American's search of identity in America, typical for younger or current generations. Though Filipinos were already active in many aspects of American music such as jazz, Motown, and blues, the Black power movement of 1960–70 affected many other marginalized groups including Asian Americans in accessing their own identity in American culture. Younger generations of Asian Americans wanted to distinguish themselves from American culture and the culture of their original country's heritage.

Passing of traditional aspects of Filipino dance can be informal, since a main focus is usually passing of participatory aspect or the nostalgia, rather than completely traditional. Young Filipinos are an influential segment of music and dance ensembles, largely due to student organized Pilipino Cultural Nights. Large cuts towards in educational budgets of ethnic studies on college campuses during the late 1970s-80s also created a call for identity, particularly for Filipinos, where many felt their identity is "invisible" in the Asian American affairs. This "invisibility" to many students is related to their panethnicity, and may align themselves with the Latino, Pacific Islander, or other marginalized groups and their identity more so than Asian American due to colonial history and socioeconomic conditions of first-generation Manongs.

==== Neo-traditional gong-chime ensembles ====
Some of the features or examples of neo-traditional music are gong musics. Gong music are from Filipino traditional that has a basis in Islamic culture. Examples of neo-traditional style influencing gong music occurring in the United States are the Samahan Percussion Ensemble of San Diego and the 1957 Cumbancero Percussionaires of Seattle. The Cumbancero Percussionaires was an organized effort by the Filipino community in Seattle in order to solidify the young Filipinos identity. In 1968 the Seattle ensemble emerged, with unique aspects to traditional styles including dress style and music, for music originally derived from the Upland Philippines mixed. This newer style exists only in the United States and attempts to raise ethnic awareness across cultures.

== Debate ==
The United States had numerous labor camps for Filipino workers, where laborers often practiced music and movement from their practices back home. As time moved on and newer experiences felt the need for expression along with American musical influences, Filipino American music has changed or adapted for many different cultures.

In the 1980s large masses of Filipinos were gradually assimilating into non-urban metropolitan areas or the surrounding suburbs of these centers coinciding with newer immigrant families setting newer communities, creating a generational and socioeconomic gap between the earlier generations in America. Town associations and cultural nights often have fundraising and Filipino American community awareness programs and projects, but to many older generations, traditional music in these contexts serves a different purpose. Some older generational Filipino Americans to feel nostalgia for life in the Philippines. Village life in the Philippines focuses highly on traditional dance and music, while urban areas even while under American style education systems, feature dance and musical performances as secondary activity or part of physical education. Though a lot of traditional practices can seem to be informal and more so focused on the practice of keeping traditions than complete accuracy or authenticity, changing many formats of PCN or cultural dances can be controversial if completely straying from the familiar PCN format or lineup.

Not only are elements in traditional Filipino music and performances and changes can seem controversial, but also Americanized forms of media are scrutinized by many nationalists in the Philippines that want to decry Westernization. Renato Constantino, a 1980s Filipino critic compared American pop music influence on Filipinos as a sedating force that not only distorts reality, but cause the listeners or audiences to ignore true societal problems, hence a dangerous form of escapism for a society like the Philippines that was once a form colony. Filipinos and Filipino Americans have often debated about language in music, as language can be seen as an element of national identity. Various nationalists have also critiqued the use of English or "Taglish" which is a mix of Tagalog and English in works of art and especially music. Once again, in the 1980s a large focus on American or Americanized pop style songs was seen as a way to dissolve or weaken true Filipino cultural in a neo-colonial period. Doreen Fernandez, a famous Filipina writer has written strongly opposing American influence in mass media, even stating "It is quite simply, and I use the term descriptively, cultural imperialism.... Before most Filipinos become aware of Filipino literature, song, dance, history..., education, language and the media have already made them alert to American life and culture and its desirability. They sing of White Christmases and of Manhattan. Their stereos reverberate with the American Top 40. In their minds sparkle images of Dynasty, Miami Vice and L.A. Law. They embrace the American Dream."

Though seen by some nationalists as a way to continue imperialism, pinoy music and that of American-influenced rock and folk elements were used in the Philippines as resistance or for activism, especially during years of martial law or political instability that was in the Philippines during the 1970s. Particularly of that Freddie Aguilar, who used Filipino-centric themes and issues surrounding his country, but yet his instrumentation were heavily American influenced along with the 1970s American hippie movement.

=== Contemporary Filipino American music ===
==== Hip hop ====
Pinoy hip hop has been inspired by African American artists of the United States, particularly those of other races such as Latinos and other Asian Americans in the multiracial and multicultural San Francisco Bay Area and other metropolitan areas in California. The San Francisco Bay Area represents one of the largest Filipino populations outside of Manila.

Some notable Filipino American hip hop artists include Jack Dejusus (a.k.a. 'Kiwi') and Jonah Deocampo (a.k.a. 'Bambu') in the group Native Guns which also features Chinese American Patrick Huang (a.k.a. DJ Phatrick). Formed in 2002 as a West Coast underground hip hop group, the trio produced albums and mixtapes with themes of activism and particularly geared toward life in Los Angeles during the aftermath of the 1992 Los Angeles riots. A main feature of their work is the racially fueled times for minorities in the United States and how colored urban youths are treated unfairly in the United States. Their work can be described of that of "raptivism", as seen by their use of sampling Martin Luther King Jr. speeches into their work. Though Filipinos, their multicultural and multiracial messages are of most other racial groups, which can be seen by mentioning they are from "Califaztlan", a term heavily used by Chicano members. The group produced the critically acclaimed album Barrel Men (2006) along with two mixtapes Stray Bullets Mixtape Volume I (2004) and Stray Bullets Mixtape Volume II (2007). Both members have released solo material of equal themes of activism, with Bambu releasing his album Self-Titled (2002) on the tenth anniversary of the L.A. riots since he was involved and acted in the riots themselves. Native Guns disbanded in 2007, however, they came back together in 2010 to produce the song "Hand Cuffs", continuing to use their personal experiences of police in L.A. in the 1990s and have a strong anti-LAPD message.

===== Apl.de.ap =====
Black Eyed Peas musician apl.de.ap is a Filipino-American and is known as a hip-hop artist who also features elements of Filipino identity into his works, especially in "The Apl Song" off of the album Elephunk. "The Apl Song" not only contains elements of Tagalog language and mentions distinct Filipino elements, but the track itself according to video producer Christina DeHaven represents Allan Pineda Lindo's reflection of the Philippines when traveling back for the first time since he was 14 years old. The song features both Tagalog and English lyrics. In the English verses of the song, Pineda describes aspects of Filipino life back home which is seen in the lyrics "How would you feel if you had to catch your meal, build a hut to live and to eat and chill in, having to pump the water outta the ground?". The shifting between Tagalog and English can be interpreted as showing both languages as equal or in an equal hierarchical relationship to one another which is especially important having included another language other than English in an American pop song, even though English is one of two of the official languages of the Philippines.

===== Pinoy rock =====
Pinoy rock is a genre of music that can be defined in its early creation as a combination of rock, folk and ballads and was popular with urban youth. Pinoy rock is often sung in Pilipino slang, rather than English.

===== Jazzipino =====
Hollywood-based musician Charmaine Clamor is accredited for creating the music genre "jazzipino". The term comes from her various works of Americana music elements such as jazz along with classic traditional songs from the Philippines. Her single "Flippin' Out" landed very favorable spots on JazzWeek World in 2007. She is notable for standing in her "successful attempts to infuse jazz with her Filipino culture - a musical art form which she pioneered and deemed as 'jazzipino', in which Filipino folk music traditions, language and indigenous instruments get mixed in with the rhythms and style arrangements of American jazz."

== See also ==
- List of Filipino-American musical groups
