= Filipino Americans =

Americans of Filipino descent

Filipino Americans Mga Pilipinong Amerikano
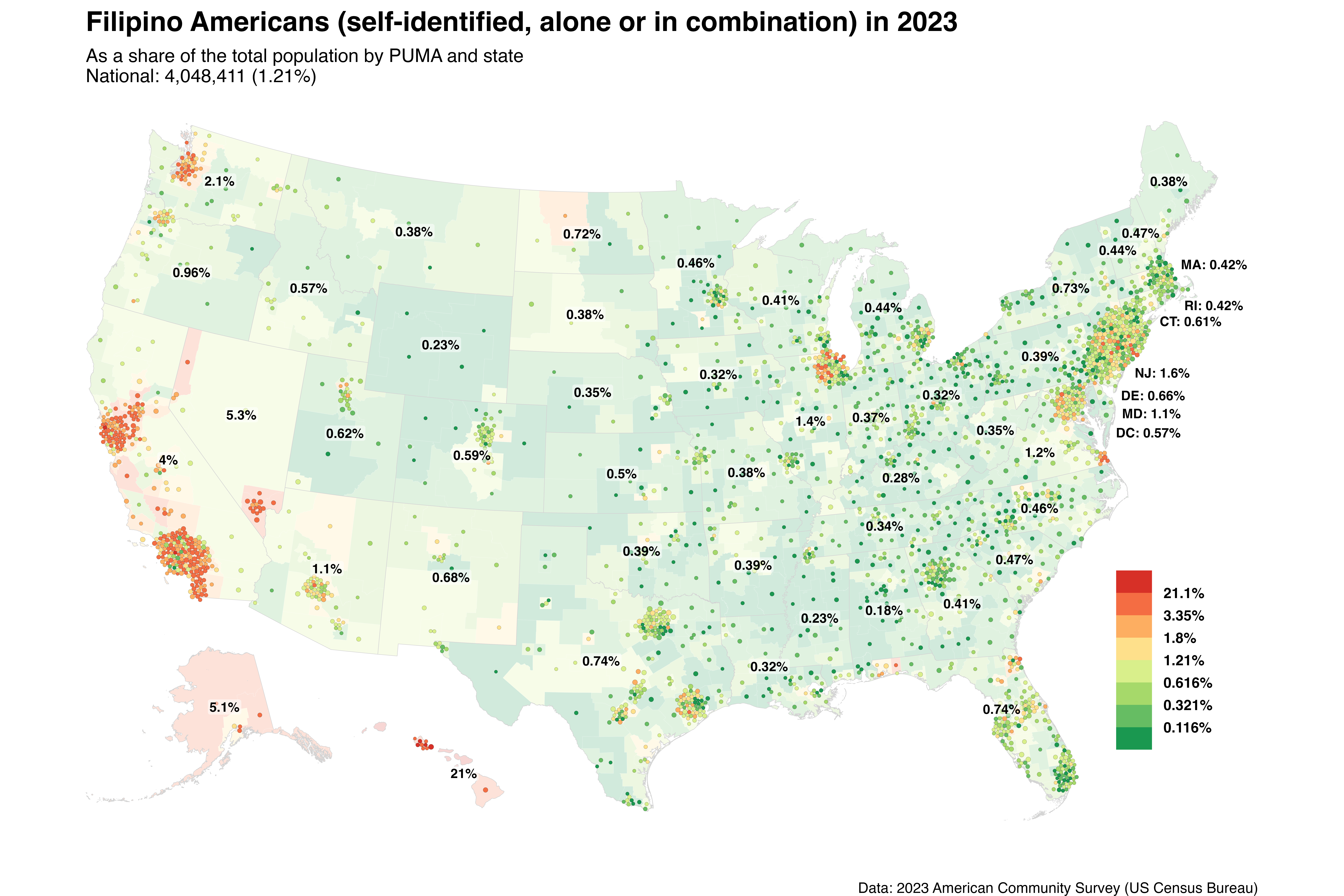
- Map depicting Filipino Americans percentage-wise by PUMA and state in 2023

Total population
- 4,640,313 (2023) 5,000,000 (ancestry or ethnic origin); 2,051,900 (2023) (born in the Philippines)

Regions with significant populations
- Western United States, Hawaii, especially in metropolitan areas and elsewhere as of 2020
- Texas; Florida; Illinois; New Jersey; New York; Virginia; Las Vegas Valley

Languages
- English (American, Philippine), Tagalog (Filipino), Ilocano, Pangasinan, Kapampangan, Bikol, Visayan languages (Cebuano, Hiligaynon, Waray, Chavacano), and other languages of the Philippines; Spanish, Chinese (Minnan and Fujien)

Religion
- 65% Roman Catholicism; 21% Protestantism; 8% Irreligion; 1% Buddhism

Related ethnic groups
- Overseas Filipinos, Southeast Asians, Austronesian

Filipino Americans (Filipino: Mga Pilipinong Amerikano) are Americans of Filipino ancestry. Filipinos in North America were first documented in the 16th century and other small settlements beginning in the 18th century. Mass migration did not begin until after the end of the Spanish–American War at the end of the 19th century, when the Philippines was ceded from Spain to the United States in the Treaty of Paris.

As of 2022, there were almost 4.5 million Filipino Americans in the United States with large communities in California, Hawaii, Texas, Nevada, Washington, Florida, Illinois, the New York metropolitan area, and Virginia. Around one third of Filipino Americans identify as multiracial or multiethnic, with 3 million reporting only Filipino ancestry and 1.5 million reporting Filipino in combination with another group.

== Terminology ==
The term Filipino American is sometimes shortened to Fil-Am or Pinoy. Another term which has been used is Philippine Americans. The earliest appearance of the term Pinoy (feminine Pinay), was in a 1926 issue of the Filipino Student Bulletin. Some Filipinos believe that the term Pinoy was coined by Filipinos who came to the United States to distinguish themselves from Filipinos living in the Philippines. Beginning in 2017, started by individuals who identify with the LGBT+ Filipino-American population, there is an effort to adopt the term FilipinX; this new term has faced opposition within the broader overseas Filipino diaspora, within the Philippines, and in the United States, with some who are in opposition believing it is an attempt of a "colonial imposition".

== Background ==
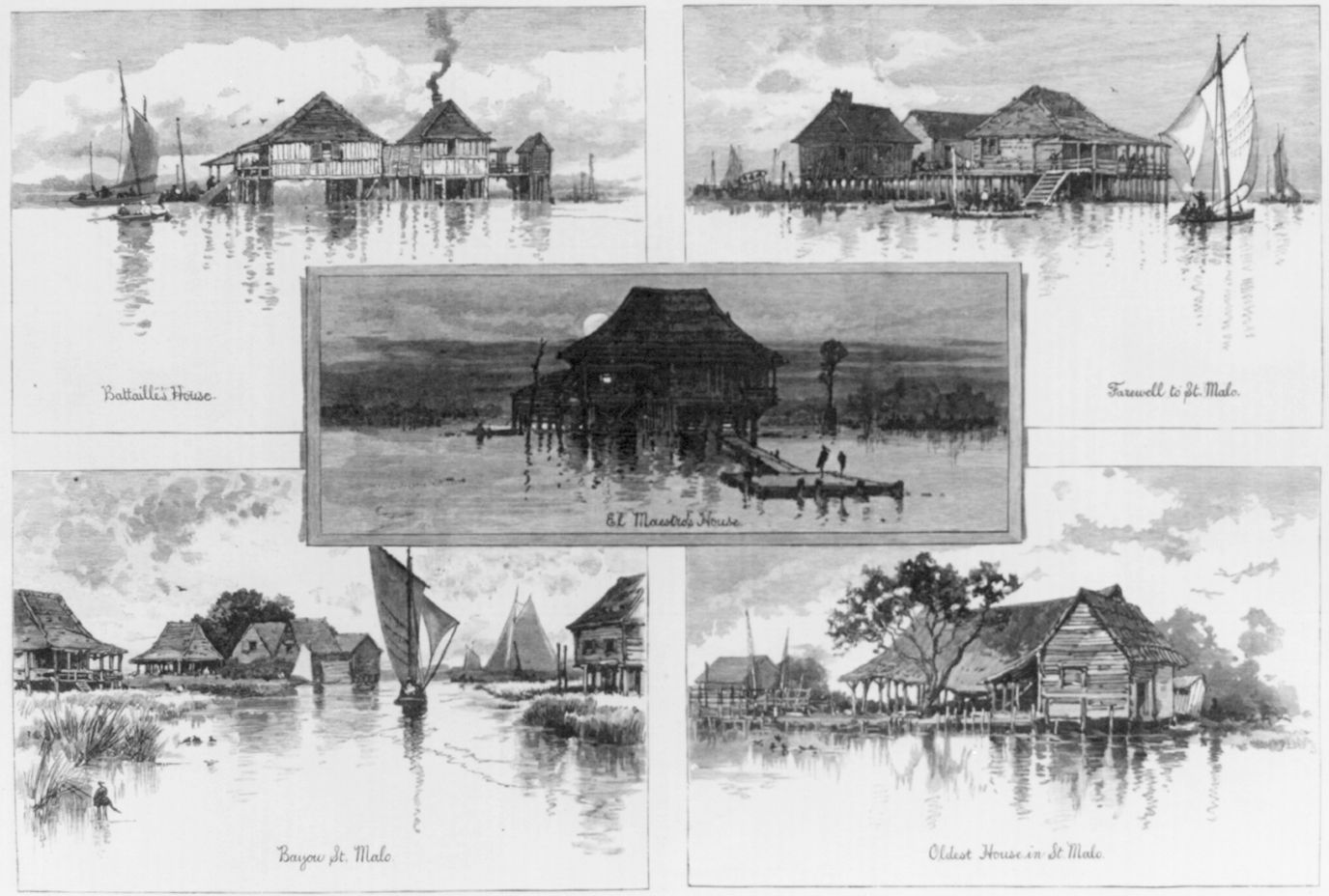
Five images of the Filipino settlement at Saint Malo, Louisiana

Filipino were among the first Asians in North America. The first documented presence of Filipinos in what is now the United States dates back to a visit made by a Novohispanic ship sailing back to modern day Mexico in October 1587 around Morro Bay, California, with the first settlement of a handful of Filipinos who deserted Spanish ships being in Saint Malo, Spanish Louisiana, in 1763, the settlers there were called "Manilamen" and they served in the Battle of New Orleans during the closing stages of the War of 1812, after the Treaty of Ghent had already been signed. Some Filipinos worked as ranch hands in the 1800s. There was also a settlement in Plaquemines Parish, which became known as "Manila Village". This area was the center of the shrimp drying industry in Louisiana, and its workforce was composed predominantly of Filipino migrants. Mass migration began in the early 20th century when, for a period following the 1898 Treaty of Paris, the Philippines was a territory of the United States. By 1904, Filipino peoples of different ethnic backgrounds were imported by the US government onto the Americas and were displayed at the Louisiana Purchase Exposition as part of a human zoo. During the 1920s, many Filipinos immigrated to the United States as unskilled labor, to provide better opportunities for their families back at home.

Philippine independence was recognized by the United States on July 4, 1946. After independence in 1946, Filipino-American numbers continued to grow. Immigration was reduced significantly during the 1930s, except for those who served in the United States Navy, and increased following immigration reform in the 1960s. The majority of Filipinos who immigrated after the passage of the Immigration and Nationality Act of 1965 were skilled professionals and technicians.

The 2010 census counted 3.4 million Filipino Americans; the United States Department of State in 2011 estimated the total at 4 million, or 1.1% of the US population. They are the country's second-largest self-reported Asian ancestry group after Chinese Americans according to 2010 American Community Survey. They are also the largest population of Overseas Filipinos. Significant populations of Filipino Americans can be found in California, Florida, Texas, Hawaii, the New York metropolitan area, and Illinois.

== Demographics ==
Some Filipinos have traditional Philippine surnames, such as Bacdayan or Macapagal, while others have surnames derived from Japanese, Indian, and Chinese and reflect centuries of trade with these merchants preceding European and American rule. Reflecting its 333 years of Spanish rule, many Filipinos adopted Hispanic surnames, and celebrate fiestas.

Despite being from Asia, Filipinos are sometimes called "Latinos" due to their historical relationship to Spanish colonialism; this view is not universally accepted. The Philippines experienced both Spanish and American colonial territorial status, (Note: Other nations and territories that were once part of the Spanish Empire and also were or are currently part of the United States include Florida, Texas, Mexican Cession, Gadsden Purchase, Puerto Rico, Guam, Panama Canal Zone, and Trust Territory of the Pacific Islands.) with its population seen through each nation's racial constructs. This shared history may also contribute to why some Filipinos choose to also identify as Hispanic or Latino, while others may not and identify more as Asian Americans. In a 2017 Pew Research Survey, only 1% of immigrants from the Philippines identified as Hispanic. Some Filipino Americans may identify as being Pacific Islanders; as many as 8% of Filipinos may self identify as Pacific Islanders, while the majority (85%) identify as Asian.

=== Language ===
Tagalog language spread in the United States

Filipino (Note: Filipino is derived from Tagalog, which is used as its base language plus loan words from other Philippine languages and English.) and English are constitutionally established as official languages in the Philippines, and Filipino is designated as the national language, with English in wide use. (Note: Spanish ceased being an official language of the Philippines in 1987.) Many Filipinos speak Philippine English, a dialect derived from American English due to American colonial influence in the country's education system and due to limited Spanish education.

Among Asian Americans in 1990, Filipino Americans had the smallest percentage of individuals who had problems with English. In 2000, among US-born Filipino Americans, three quarters responded that English is their primary language; nearly half of Filipino Americans speak English exclusively. (Note: Filipinos who emigrated to the United States may continue to speak in Philippine English, who may improve their American English over time. Philippine English acceptance by American-born Filipino Americans has improved over time, with less negative attitudes towards it compared to past studies.) In 2003, Tagalog was the fifth-most-spoken language in the United States, with 1.262 million speakers; by 2011, it was the fourth most-spoken language in the United States. Tagalog usage is significant in California, Nevada, and Washington, while Ilocano usage is significant in Hawaii. Other significant Filipino languages are Ilocano and Cebuano. Other languages spoken in Filipino-American households include Pangasinan, Kapampangan, Hiligaynon, Bicolano and Waray. However, fluency in Philippine languages tends to be lost among second- and third-generation Filipino Americans. Other languages of the community include Spanish and Chinese (Hokkien and Mandarin). In 2023, Tagalog was the third most spoken language in households, after English and Spanish, in 15 different cities. (Note: The cities are Anchorage, Alaska; Chesapeake, Virginia; Chula Vista, California; Corpus Christi, Texas; Gilbert, Arizona, Henderson, Nevada; Jacksonville, Florida; Las Vegas, Nevada; Long Beach, California; Norfolk, Virginia; Reno, Nevada; Riverside, California; San Diego, California; Stockton, California; and Virginia Beach, Virginia.) By 2025, 85% of Filipinos had English proficiency, 43% of spoke Filipino/Tagalog, 2% spoke Ilocano, 1% spoke Cebuano, and 1% spoke Spanish.

Many of California's public announcements and documents are translated into Tagalog. Tagalog and Ilocano is also taught in some public schools in the United States, as well as at some colleges. The demonym, Filipinx, is a gender-neutral term that can be applied only to those of Filipino heritage in the diaspora, specifically Filipino Americans. The term is not applied to Filipinos in the Philippines. The usage of the term is controversial.

=== Religion ===
Religious Makeup of Filipino-Americans (2012)
1. Catholicism (65.0%)
2. Evangelical Protestant (12.0%)
3. Mainline Protestant (9.00%)
4. Unaffiliated (8.00%)
5. Other Christian (3.00%)
6. Buddhism (1.00%)
7. Other (2.00%)

The Philippines is 90% Christian, one of only two predominantly Christian countries in Southeast Asia, alongside East Timor. Following the European arrival to the Philippines by Ferdinand Magellan, Spaniards made a concerted effort to convert Filipinos to Catholicism; outside of the Muslim sultanates and animist societies, missionaries were able to convert large numbers of Filipinos. and the majority are Roman Catholic, giving Catholicism a major impact on Filipino culture. Other Christian denominations include Protestants (Aglipayan, Episcopalian, and others), and nontrinitarians (Iglesia ni Cristo and Jehovah's Witnesses). Additionally there are those Filipinos who are Muslims, Buddhist or nonreligious; religion has served as a dividing factor within the Philippines and Filipino-American communities.

During the early part of the United States governance in the Philippines, there was a concerted effort to convert Filipinos into Protestants, and the results came with varying success. As Filipinos began to migrate to the United States, Filipino Roman Catholics were often not embraced by their American Catholic brethren, nor were they sympathetic to a Filipino-ized Catholicism, in the early 20th century. This led to creation of ethnic-specific parishes; one such parish was St. Columban's Church in Los Angeles. In 1997, the Filipino oratory was dedicated at the Basilica of the National Shrine of the Immaculate Conception, owing to increased diversity within the congregations of American Catholic parishes. The first-ever American Church for Filipinos, San Lorenzo Ruiz Church in New York City, is named after the first saint from the Philippines, San Lorenzo Ruiz. This was officially designated as a church for Filipinos in July 2005, the first in the United States, and the second in the world, after a church in Rome.

In 2010, Filipino American Catholics were the largest population of Asian American Catholics, making up more than three fourths of Asian American Catholics. In 2015, a majority (65%) of Filipino Americans identify as Catholic; this is down slightly from 2004 (68%). In 2023, three quarters of surveyed Filipino Americans identify as Christian, with the majority of those surveyed being Catholic. Filipino Americans, who are first-generation immigrants were more likely to attend mass weekly, and tended to be more conservative, than those who were born in the United States. Culturally, some traditions and beliefs rooted from the original indigenous religions of Filipinos are still known among the Filipino diaspora.

=== Politics ===
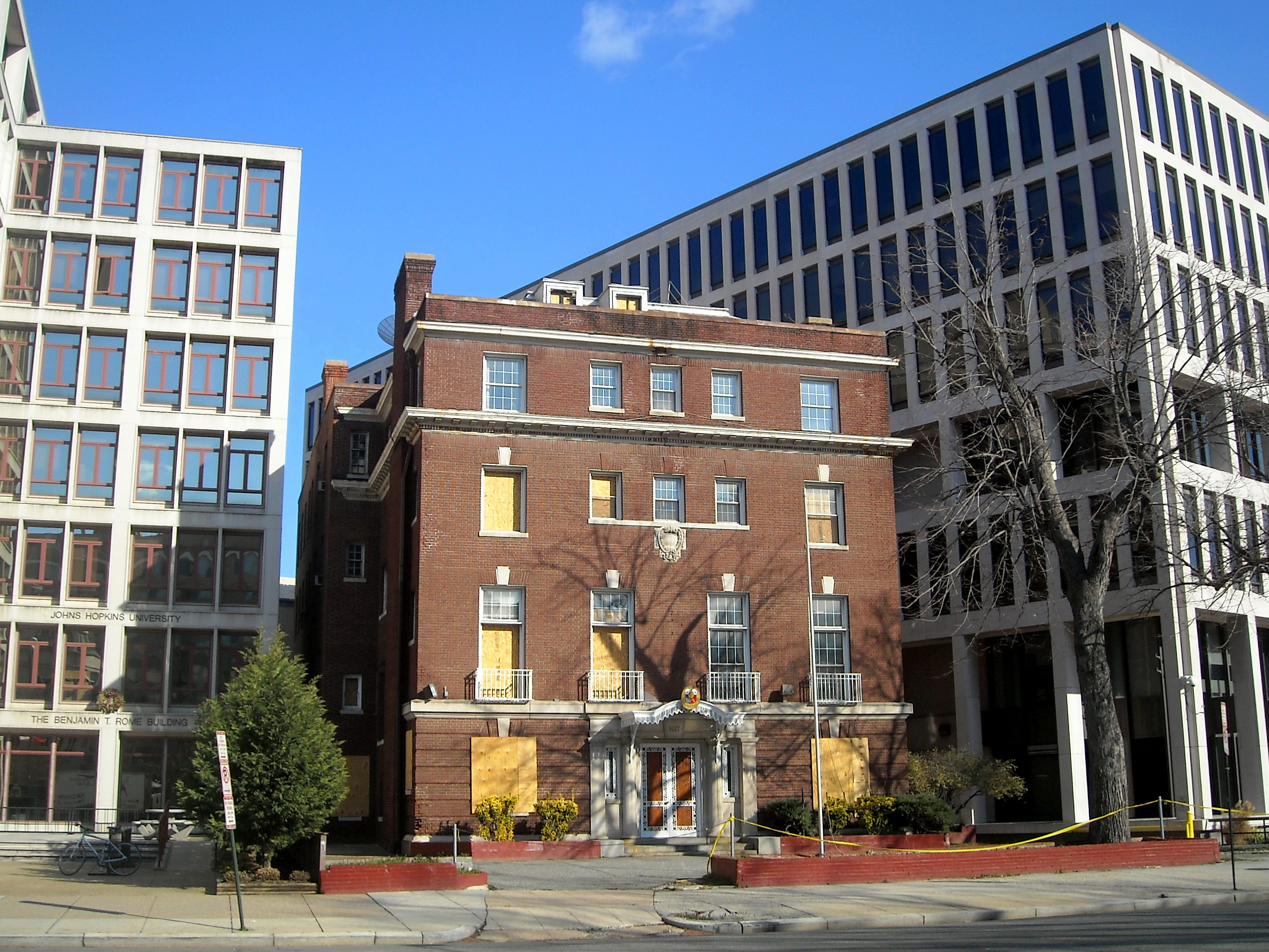
Headquarters of the government in exile and temporary capital of the Commonwealth of the Philippines

Filipino Americans have traditionally been socially conservative, particularly with "second wave" immigrants; the first Filipino American elected to office was Peter Aduja. In the 2004 US presidential election Republican president George W. Bush won the Filipino-American vote over John Kerry by nearly a two-to-one ratio, which followed strong support in the 2000 election. However, during the 2008 US presidential election, Filipino Americans voted majority Democratic, with 50% to 58% of the community voting for President Barack Obama and 42% to 46% voting for Senator John McCain. The 2008 election marked the first time that a majority of Filipino Americans voted for a Democratic presidential candidate.

According to the 2012 National Asian American Survey, conducted in September 2012, 45% of Filipinos were independent or nonpartisan, 27% were Republican, and 24% were Democrats. Additionally, Filipino Americans had the largest proportions of Republicans among Asian Americans polled, a position normally held by Vietnamese Americans, leading up to the 2012 election, and had the lowest job approval opinion of Obama among Asian Americans. In a survey of Asian Americans from thirty-seven cities conducted by the Asian American Legal Defense and Education Fund, it found that of the Filipino-American respondents, 65% voted for Obama. According to an exit poll conducted by the Asian American Legal Defense and Education Fund, it found that 71% of responding Filipino Americans voted for Hillary Clinton during the 2016 general election. Filipino Americans are more receptive to gun rights compared to other Asian-American ethnic groups; this is in part due to firearm laws in the Philippines.

In a survey conducted by the advocacy group Asian Americans Advancing Justice in September 2020, of the 263 Filipino American respondents, 46% identified as Democrats, 28% identified as Republicans, and 16% as independent. According to interviews conducted by academic Anthony Ocampo, Filipino American supporters of Donald Trump cited their support for the former President based on support for building a border wall, tax cuts to businesses, legal immigration, school choice, opposition to abortion, opposition to affirmative action, antagonism towards the People's Republic of China, and viewing Trump as a non-racist. There was an age divide among Filipino Americans, with older Filipino Americans more likely to support Trump or be Republicans, and younger Filipino Americans more likely to support Biden or be Democrats. In the 2020 presidential election, Philippines Ambassador Jose Manuel Romualdez alleged that 60% of Filipino Americans reportedly voted for Joe Biden. Several Filipino Americans participated in the events at the United States Capital on January 6, 2021. The news site Rappler reported the next day that Filipino-American media has heavily repeated QAnon conspiracies. Rappler reported that some Filipino Americans, who voted for Trump, cite similar political opinions in the Philippines regarding Philippine President Rodrigo Duterte and anti-Chinese sentiment since China has been building artificial reefs in the South China Sea near the Philippines in the 2010s, and have recently seen the Republican Party as more hardline against the Chinese government's actions.

Of the 1,051 Filipinos surveyed by the Pew Research Center in 2022 & 2023, 68% were democrats, or leaned democrat, and 31% were republican, or lean republican. In the 2024 election, most Filipino Americans, in Nevada, have responded to a survey indicating 59% of them found Vice President Kamala Harris more favorably, while 29% found former President Donald Trump favorable. (Note: This differed from polling in the Philippines that found that 18% of poll respondents favored Trump, while 14% favored Harris.) That said, 38% of Asian American voters in Nevada voted for Donald Trump; these voters included Filipino Americans, who are the largest Asian American population in Nevada. In 2026, Rappler reported that 35% of Filipino Americans polled supported Donald Trump in 2024.

Due to scattered living patterns, it is nearly impossible for Filipino American candidates to win an election solely based on the Filipino-American vote. Filipino-American politicians have increased their visibility over the past few decades. Ben Cayetano (Democrat), former governor of Hawaii, became the first governor of Filipino descent in the United States. The number of Congressional members of Filipino descent doubled to numbers not reached since 1937, two when the Philippine Islands were represented by non-voting Resident Commissioners, due to the 2000 senatorial election. In 2009 three Congress-members claimed at least one-eighth Filipino ethnicity; the largest number to date. Since the resignation of Senator John Ensign in 2011 (the only Filipino American to have been a member of the Senate), and Representative Steve Austria (the only Asian Pacific American Republican in the 112th Congress) choosing not to seek reelection and retire, Representative Robert C. Scott was the only Filipino American in the 113th Congress. In the 116th United States Congress, Scott was joined by Rep. TJ Cox, bringing the number of Filipino Americans in Congress to two. In the 117th United States Congress, Scott once again became the sole Filipino-American Representative after Cox was defeated in a rematch against David Valadao.

== Socioeconomic demographics ==
=== Economics ===
According to Pew Research study in 2024,Filipino Americans are largely middle class with 62% of households being middle income. From the same study, 21% of Filipino-American households were reportedly Upper Income; this is higher than the 17% rate for All Americans, comparable to the 21% rate of White Americans, and lower than the 27% rate of All Asian households. They are less likely to be Upper Income than all Asians. Filipino Americans have high labor force participation rates and 67% of Filipino Americans are employed.

Filipino Americans are more likely to live in larger, overcrowded (8.7% of Filipino housing units compared to 3.5% of total population), multi-generational (34%) households compared to the general population. The average household size for Filipino Americans in 2023 was 2.99 compared to 2.49 for the general population.

The impressive annual median household income and low poverty rates must be approached with caution, for median household income represents the combined earnings of several family or household members often living in crowded and less than adequate houses.

While the median household income for Filipino alone was high, per capita income for Filipino Americans was $47,819 which was significantly lower than for all Asians ($55,561) and Non-Hispanic Whites ($50,675). It is somewhat higher than the median per capita income of All Americans ($45,140). Individual earnings for both Filipino males and females were significantly lower than all Asians, suggesting multiple earners in a household. Filipino-American full-time, year-round workers had an average hourly wage of $29.35, lower than the US average of $29.95 and AAPI average of $30.73

39% of Filipino American men (ages 25–34) had attained a Bachelor's degree, slightly higher than the national average for men at 37.1%. The rate of Filipino American men with Bachelor's degrees is lower in comparison to 87% of Asian Indian American men, 69% of Chinese American men, 63% of Japanese American men, 62% of Korean American men, and 42% of Vietnamese American men. The same study showed that Filipino, Korean and Cambodian men with Bachelor's degrees have lower median wages of $30 an hour compared to Chinese and Indian immigrant men who had median wages of $40 an hour

Filipino American households in Los Angeles had a net worth of $243,000 with $5,000 in debts compared to a net worth of $355,000 for White households, $595,000 for Japanese households, $408,500 for Chinese households and $460,000 for Indian American households.

Filipino Americans had a significantly higher rate of food insecurity (11%) than all Asians and White Americans (6%).

Filipino Americans had a lower poverty rate (7%) than the total population, this correlates with the Filipino-American unemployment rate being only 3% and a high labor force participation rate of 67%.

There is a trend of second-generation Filipino Americans moving back to the Philippines, finding the American Dream more and more unattainable. They cite lower cost of living as the main reasons they would move back to the Philippines. There is also a trend of Filipino Americans relocating from Hawaii and California to Nevada due to rising cost of living and housing prices.

==== Per capita income ====
Ethnicity	Per capita income
Ethnicity	As of 2023
Indian	$72,389
Chinese	$62,605
Japanese	$61,568
Korean	$58,560
White (Non Hispanic)	$50,675
Filipino	$47,819
Vietnamese	$40,037
Total US Population	$43,313

Average hourly wages for full-time, year-round workers in 2019

Group	Hourly wage
Indian	$51.19
Chinese	$43.35
Pakistani	$40.50
Japanese	$39.51
Korean	$39.47
Sri Lankan	$36.06
Malaysian	$35.25
Indonesian	$32.49
Fijian	$31.21
Mongolian	$31.13
AAPI average	$30.73
US average	$29.95
Bangladeshi	$29.70
Vietnamese	$29.38
Filipino	$29.35
Nepalese	$28.44
Thai	$27.53
Tongan	$25.99
Hawaiian	$25.75
Samoan	$23.72
Laotian	$23.61
Cambodian	$23.12
Guamanian/Chamorro	$23.12
Burmese	$21.63
Bhutanese	$15.36

=== Industry and jobs ===
The representation of Filipino Americans employed in health care is high. Other sectors of the economy where Filipino Americans have significant representation are in the public sector, and in the service sector. Compared to Asian-American women of other ethnicities, and women in the United States in general, Filipina Americans are more likely to be part of the work force; a large population, nearly one fifth (18%), of Filipina Americans worked as registered nurses. There is also a large number of Filipino domestic workers and care-givers in the US. More than 60% of Filipino Americans work in low-wage and/or service-sector work.

Filipino Americans own a variety of businesses, making up 10.5% of all Asian owned businesses in the United States in 2007. In 2002, according to the Survey of Business Owners, there were over 125,000 Filipino-owned businesses; this increased by 30.4% to over 163,000 in 2007. By then, 25.4% of these businesses were in the retail industry, 23% were in the health care and social assistance industries, and they employed more than 142,000 people and generated almost $15.8 billion in revenue. Of those, just under three thousand (1.8% of all Filipino-owned businesses) were million dollar or more businesses. This means Filipino-owned businesses are significantly less likely to be million dollar or more than all Asians (5%). California had the largest number of Filipino-owned businesses, with the Los Angeles metropolitan area having the largest number of any metropolitan area in the United States.

The Philippines is the largest exporters of Nurses and this is something that can be traced back to US colonialism. America has been relying on Filipino nurses on the frontlines since the AIDS pandemic. Despite being comprised only 4% of registered nurses in the US, they were nearly a third of Covid-related deaths among registered nurses.

American schools have also hired and sponsored the immigration of Filipino teachers and instructors. Some of these teachers were forced into labor outside the field of education, and mistreated by their recruiters.

Among Overseas Filipinos, Filipino Americans are the largest remitters of US dollars to the Philippines. In 2005, their combined dollar remittances reached a record-high of almost $6.5 billion. In 2006, Filipino Americans sent more than $8 billion, which represents 57% of the total foreign remittances received by the Philippines. By 2012, this amount had reached $10.6 billion, but made up only 43% of total remittances. In 2021, the United States was the largest source of remittances to the Philippines, making up 40.5% of the $31.4 billion remittances received by the Philippines.

== Culture ==
The history of Spanish and American rule and contact with merchants and traders culminated in a unique blend of Eastern and Western cultures in the Philippines. Filipino-American cultural identity has been described as fluid, adopting aspects from various cultures; however, there has not been significant research into the culture of Filipino Americans. Fashion, dance, music, theater and arts have all had roles in building Filipino-American cultural identities and communities.

In areas of sparse Filipino population, they often form loosely-knit social organizations aimed at maintaining a "sense of family", which is a key feature of Filipino culture. These organizations generally arrange social events, especially of a charitable nature, and keep members up-to-date with local events. Organizations are often organized into regional associations. The associations are a small part of Filipino-American life. Filipino Americans formed close-knit neighborhoods, notably in California and Hawaii. A few communities have "Little Manilas", civic and business districts tailored for the Filipino-American community. In a Filipino party, shoes should be left in the front of the house and greet everyone with a hi or hello. When greeting older relatives, 'po' and 'opo' must be said in every sentence to show respect.

The Filipino Town Cultural District was officially created on April 15, 2025, to honor Filipino American culture in Las Vegas.

Due to history, the Philippines and the United States are connected culturally. In 2016, there was $16.5 billion worth of trade between the two countries, with the United States being the largest foreign investor in the Philippines, and more than 40% of remittances came from (or through) the United States. In 2004, the amount of remittances coming from the United States was $5 billion; this is an increase from the $1.16 billion sent in 1991 (then about 80% of total remittances being sent to the Philippines), and the $324 million sent in 1988. Some Filipino Americans have chosen to retire in the Philippines, buying real estate. Filipino Americans, continue to travel back and forth between the United States and the Philippines, making up more than a tenth of all foreign travelers to the Philippines in 2010; when traveling back to the Philippines they often bring cargo boxes known as a balikbayan box.

=== Cuisine ===
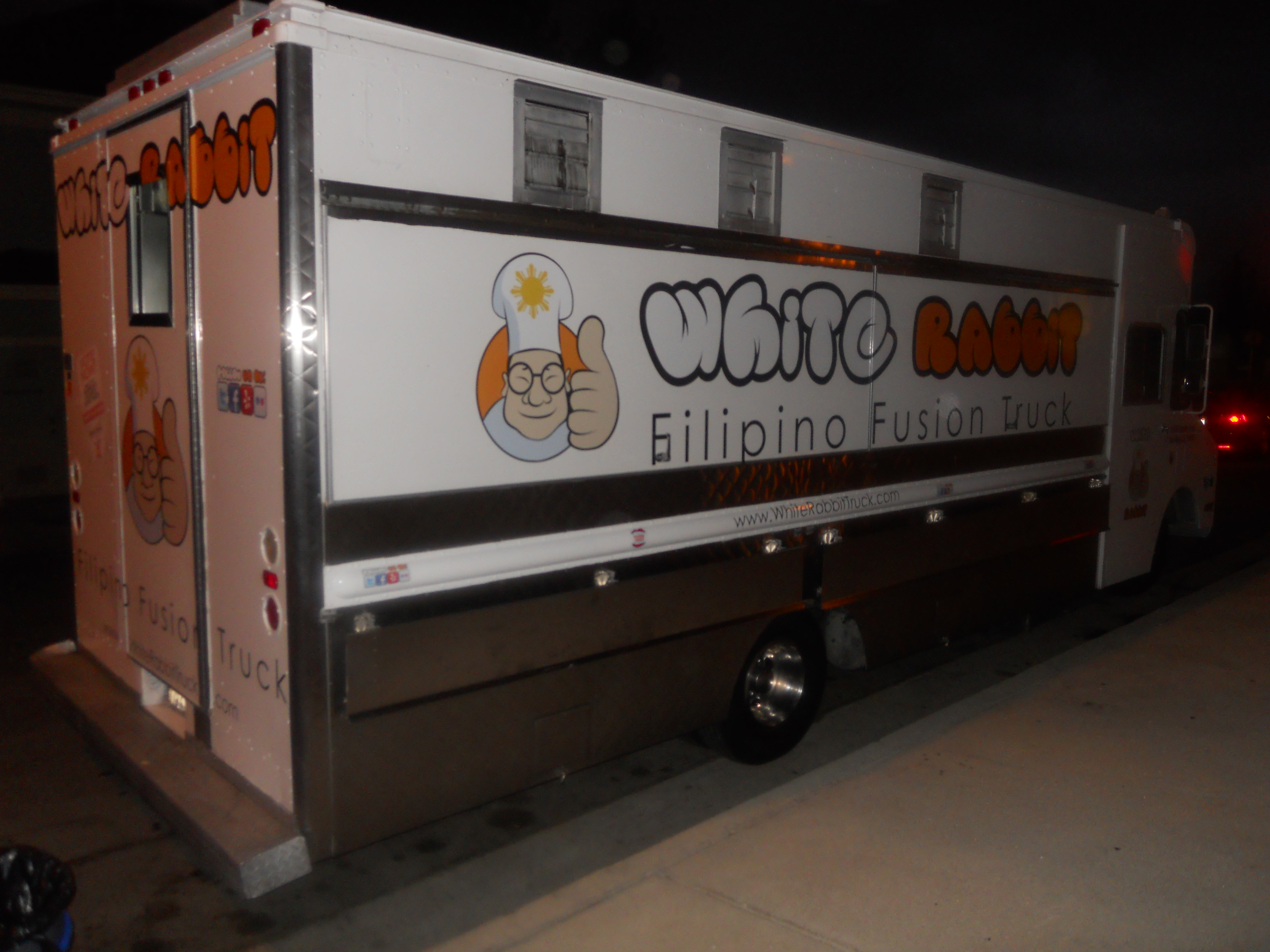
A Filipino fusion food truck in the greater Los Angeles area

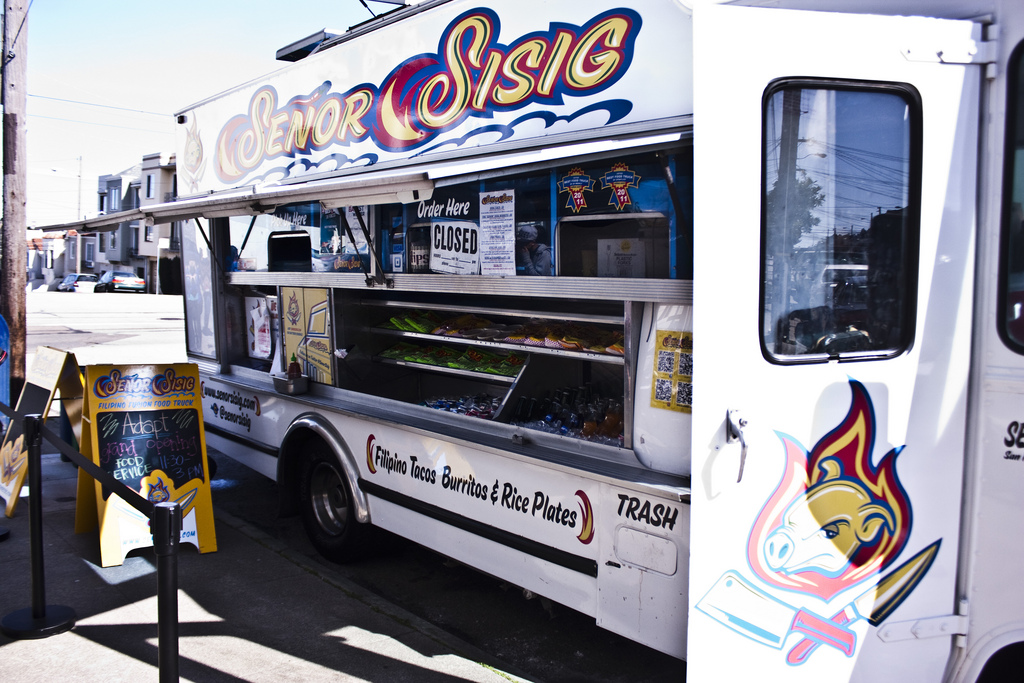
A Filipino fusion food truck in the San Francisco Bay Area

The number of Filipino restaurants does not reflect the size of the population. Due to the restaurant business not being a major source of income for the community, few non-Filipinos are familiar with the cuisine. Although American cuisine influenced Filipino cuisine, it has been criticized by non-Filipinos. Even on Oahu where there is a significant Filipino-American population, Filipino cuisine is not as noticeable as other Asian cuisines. One study found that Filipino cuisine was not often listed in food frequency questionnaires. On television, Filipino cuisine has been criticized, such as on Fear Factor, and praised, such as on Anthony Bourdain: No Reservations, and Bizarre Foods America.

While "new" Filipino restaurants and fusion-type places have been opening up, traditionally, "native cuisine proved itself strong and resistant to 'fraternization' with foreign invaders. The original dishes have retained their ingredients, cooking methods, and spirit."

Filipino cuisine is much like its culture, a blend of many influences through the years of colonization. Popular Filipino dishes such as pancit has Hokkien roots, adobo from Spain and Mexico, and the use of bagoong and patis, fermented sauces that stem from Malay origins.

Filipino-American chefs cook in many fine dining restaurants, including Cristeta Comerford who was the executive chef in the White House from 2005 until 2024, though many do not serve Filipino cuisine in their restaurants. Reasons given for the lack of Filipino cuisine in the US include colonial mentality, lack of a clear identity, a preference for cooking at home, a continuing preference of Filipino Americans for cuisines other than their own, and the nebulous nature of Filipino cuisine itself due to its historical influences. Filipino cuisine remains prevalent among Filipino immigrants, with restaurants and grocery stores catering to the Filipino-American community, including Jollibee, a Philippines-based fast-food chain.

In the 2010s, successful and critically reviewed Filipino-American restaurants were featured in The New York Times. That same decade began a Filipino Food movement in the United States; it has been criticized for gentrification of the cuisine. Bon Appetit named Bad Saint in Washington, D.C. "the second best new restaurant in the United States" in 2016. Food & Wine named Lasa, in Los Angeles, one of its restaurants of the year in 2018. With this emergence of Filipino-American restaurants, food critics like Andrew Zimmern have predicted that Filipino food will be "the next big thing" in American cuisine. Yet in 2017, Vogue described the cuisine as "misunderstood and neglected"; SF Weekly in 2019, later described the cuisine as "marginal, underappreciated, and prone to weird booms-and-busts".

=== Family ===
Filipino Americans undergo experiences that are unique to their own identities. These experiences derive from both the Filipino culture and American cultures individually and the dueling of these identities as well. These stressors, if great enough, can lead Filipino Americans into suicidal behaviors. Members of the Filipino community learn early on about kapwa, which is defined as "interpersonal connectedness or togetherness".

With kapwa, many Filipino Americans have a strong sense of needing to repay their family members for the opportunities that they have been able to receive. An example of this is a new college graduate feeling the need to find a job that will allow them to financially support their family and themselves. This notion comes from "utang na loob", defined as a debt that must be repaid to those who have supported the individual.

With kapwa and utang na loob as strong forces enacting on the individual, there is an "all or nothing" mentality that is being played out. In order to bring success back to one's family, there is a desire to succeed for one's family through living out a family's wants as opposed to one's own true desires. This can manifest as one entering a career path that they are not passionate in, but select in order to help support their family.

Despite many of the stressors for these students deriving from family, it also becomes apparent that these are the reasons that these students are resilient. When family conflict rises in Filipino-American families, there is a negative association with suicide attempts. This suggests that though family is a presenting stressor in a Filipino American's life, it also plays a role for their resilience. In a study conducted by Yusuke Kuroki, family connectedness, whether defined as positive or negative to each individual, served as one means of lowering suicide attempts.

=== Media ===
Beginning in the late 1800s, Filipino Americans began publishing books in the United States. The growth of publications for the masses in the Philippines accelerated during the American period. Ethnic media serving Filipino Americans dates back to the beginning of the 20th century. In 1905, pensionados at University of California, Berkeley published The Filipino Students' Magazine. One of the earliest Filipino-American newspapers published in the United States, was the Philippine Independent of Salinas, California, which began publishing in 1921. Newspapers from the Philippines, to include The Manila Times, also served the Filipino diaspora in the United States. In 1961, the Philippine News was started by Alex Esclamado, which by the 1980s had a national reach and at the time was the largest English-language Filipino newspaper. While many areas with Filipino Americans have local Filipino newspapers, one of the largest concentrations of these newspapers occur in Southern California. Beginning in 1992, Filipinas began publication, and was unique in that it focused on American-born Filipino Americans of the second and third generations. Filipinas ended its run in 2010, however it was succeeded by Positively Filipino in 2012 which included some of the staff from Filipinas. The Filipino diaspora in the United States are able to watch programming from the Philippines on television through GMA Pinoy TV and The Filipino Channel.

=== Sports ===
Filipinos all over the world may be far from their country, the Philippines, but that does not change the rules of sports or the impact of sports on the Filipino diaspora. The idea of sportsmanship and the values of an athlete transfer on Filipino Americans as well as values originating from the Philippines itself. Watching sports also make a huge impact on the Filipino American community in coherence with playing the sports. Sports brings Filipinos together no matter what distance from the Philippines they are and for many Filipino Americans it brings that sense of community and a sense of home. All sports, especially basketball, has a culture aspect among Filipino Americans and other Filipinos around the world.

== Community issues ==
=== Immigration ===
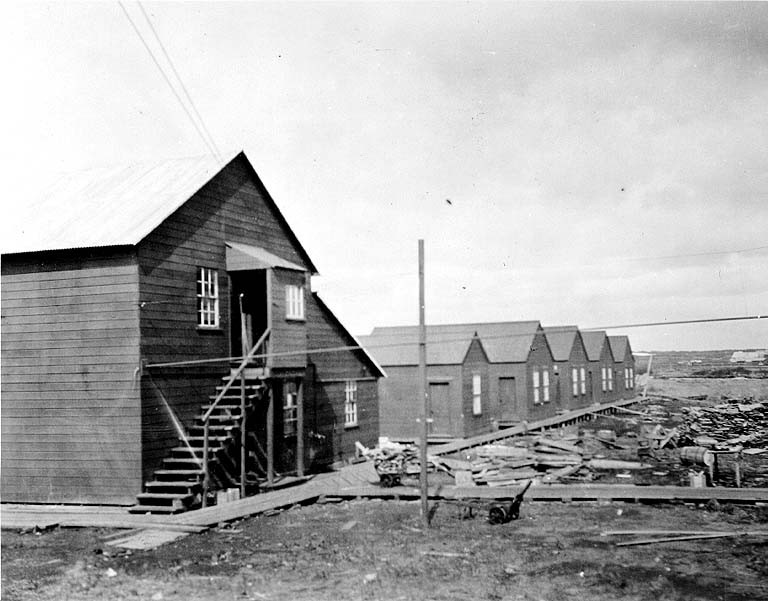
Quarters for Filipino workers at a salmon cannery in Nushagak, Alaska in 1917.

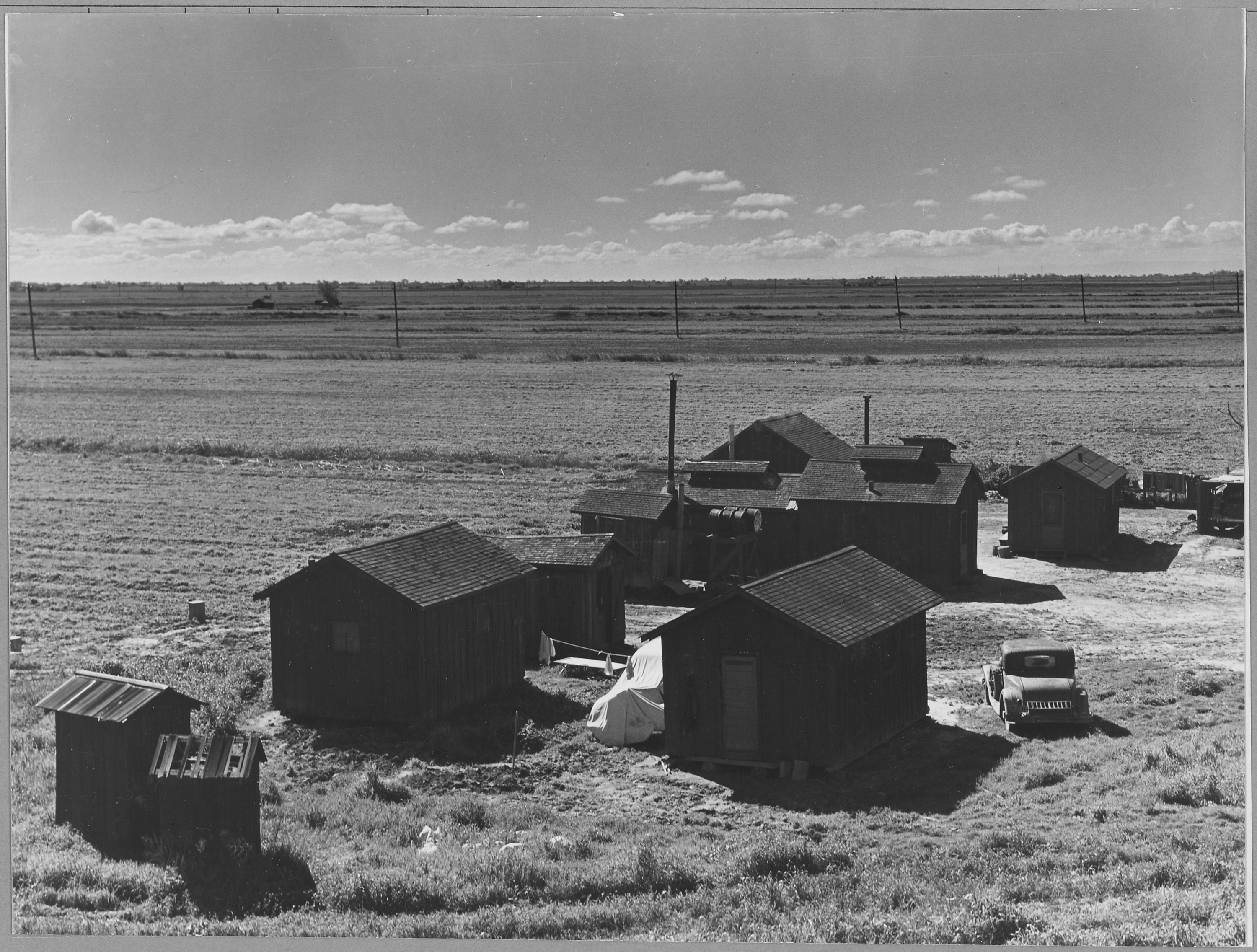
Company labor camp for Filipino farm laborers on Ryer Island in 1940

The Citizenship Retention and Re-Acquisition Act of 2003 (Republic Act No. 9225) made Filipino Americans eligible for dual citizenship in the United States and the Philippines. Overseas suffrage was first employed in the May 2004 elections in which Philippine President Gloria Macapagal Arroyo was reelected to a second term.

By 2005, about 6,000 Filipino Americans had become dual citizens of the two countries. One effect of this act was to allow Filipino Americans to invest in the Philippines through land purchases (which are limited to Filipino citizens), with some limitations former citizens vote in Philippine elections, retire in the Philippines, and participate in representing the Philippine flag. In 2013, for the Philippine general election there were 125,604 registered Filipino voters in the United States and Caribbean, of which only 13,976 voted. Since 2022, about 5,000 people have applied for dual citizenship each year.

Dual citizens have been recruited to participate in international sports events including athletes representing the Philippines who competed in the 2004 Olympic Games in Athens, and the Olympic Games in Beijing 2008.

The Philippine government actively encourages Filipino Americans to visit or return permanently to the Philippines via the "Balikbayan" program and to invest in the country.

Filipinos remain one of the largest immigrant groups to date with over 40,000 arriving annually since 1979. The United States Citizenship and Immigration Services (USCIS) has a preference system for issuing visas to non-citizen family members of US citizens, with preference based generally on familial closeness. Some non-citizen relatives of US citizens spend long periods on waiting lists. Petitions for immigrant visas, particularly for siblings of previously naturalized Filipinos that date back to 1984, were not granted until 2006. As of 2016, over 380 thousand Filipinos were on the visa wait list, second only to Mexico and ahead of India, Vietnam and China. Filipinos have the longest waiting times for family reunification visas, as Filipinos disproportionately apply for family visas; this has led to visa petitions filed in July 1989 still waiting to be processed in March 2013. (Note: According to the American Immigration Lawyers Association in 2017 the wait time for family reunification visa for Filipinos was 24 years.) As of August 2026, wait times for Filipino emigrants to the United States applying for a EB-3 visa are estimated to be six years.

==== Illegal immigration ====
It has been documented that Filipinos were among those naturalized due to the Immigration Reform and Control Act of 1986. In 2009, the Department of Homeland Security estimated that 270,000 Filipino were "unauthorized immigrants". This was an increase of 70,000 from a previous estimate in 2000. In both years, Filipinos accounted for 2% of the total. As of 2009, Filipinos were the fifth-largest community of illegal immigrants behind Mexico (6.65 million, 62%), El Salvador (530,000, 5%), Guatemala (480,000, 4%), and Honduras (320,000, 3%). Filipinos who reside in the United States illegally are known within the Filipino community as "TnT's" (tago nang tago 'hide and hide').

In January 2011, the Department of Homeland Security estimate of "unauthorized immigrants" from the Philippines remained at 270,000. By 2017, the number of Filipinos who were in the United States illegally increased to 310,000. In 2024, the estimate of Filipinos in the United States without appropriate immigration status was 370,000. From 2014 to 2024, an estimated 10,600 Filipinos were departed from the United States.

=== Health ===
Filipino Americans experience significant health disparities and are more likely to have diabetes, heart disease, high blood pressure and other issues. Filipino Americans also experience food insecurity at a significantly higher rate then other Asian-American groups. In Hawaii the rate of low food security and very low food security for Filipino people were 11.7% and 22.3%.

==== Identity ====
Filipino Americans may be mistaken for members of other racial/ethnic groups, such as Latinos or Pacific Islanders; this may lead to "mistaken" discrimination that is not specific to Asian Americans. Filipino Americans, additionally, have had difficulty being categorized, termed by one source as being in "perpetual absence".

In the period, prior to 1946, Filipinos were taught that they were American, and presented with an idealized America. They had official status as United States nationals. When ill-treated and discriminated by other Americans, Filipinos were faced with the racism of that period, which undermined these ideals. Carlos Bulosan later wrote about this experience in America is in the Heart. Even pensionados, who immigrated on government scholarships, were treated poorly.

In Hawaii, Filipino Americans often have little identification with their heritage, and it has been documented that many disclaim their ethnicity. This may be due to the "colonial mentality", or the idea that Western ideals and physical characteristics are superior to their own. Although categorized as Asian Americans, Filipino Americans have not fully embraced being part of this racial category due to marginalization by other Asian-American groups and or the dominant American society. This created a struggle within Filipino American communities over how far to assimilate. The term "white-washed" has been applied to those seeking to further assimilate. Those who disclaim their ethnicity lose the positive adjustment to outcomes that are found in those who have a strong, positive, ethnic identity.

Of the ten largest immigrant groups, Filipino Americans have the highest rate of assimilation, with the exception of cuisine. Filipino Americans have been described as the most "Americanized" of the Asian-American ethnicities. However, even though Filipino Americans are the second-largest group among Asian Americans, community activists have described the ethnicity as "invisible", claiming that the group is virtually unknown to the American public, and is often not seen as significant even among its members. Another term for this status is forgotten minority.

This description has also been used in the political arena, given the lack of political mobilization. In the mid-1990s it was estimated that some one hundred Filipino Americans have been elected or appointed to public office. This lack of political representation contributes to the perception that Filipino Americans are invisible.

The concept is also used to describe how the ethnicity has assimilated. Few affirmative action programs target the group although affirmative action programs rarely target Asian Americans in general. Assimilation was easier given that the group is majority religiously Christian, fluent in English, and have high levels of education. The concept was in greater use in the past, before the post-1965 wave of arrivals.

The term invisible minority has been used for Asian Americans as a whole, and the term "model minority" has been applied to Filipinos as well as other Asian-American groups. Filipino critics allege that Filipino Americans are ignored in immigration literature and studies.

As with fellow Asian Americans, Filipino Americans are viewed as "perpetual foreigners", even for those born in the United States. This has resulted in physical attacks on Filipino Americans, as well as non-violent forms of discrimination.

In college and high school campuses, many Filipino-American student organizations put on annual Pilipino Culture Nights to showcase dances, perform skits, and comment on issues such as identity and lack of cultural awareness due to assimilation and colonization.

Filipino-American gay, lesbian, transgender, and bisexual identities are often shaped by immigration status, generation, religion, and racial formation.

==== Suicidal ideation and depression ====
Mental health is a topic that is seldom spoken about among the Filipino-American community because of the stigma that is attached to it. In the documentary "Silent Sacrifices: Voices of the Filipino American Family" Patricia Heras points out that a lack of communication between first-generation and second-generation Filipino-American immigrants can lead to family members not understanding the personal hardships that each one goes through. Some of the main topics of discussion in this documentary are depression and suicidal ideation experienced by the second-generation youth. These topics are supported by a study that was conducted in 1997 by the Federal Centers for Disease Control and Prevention (CDC) that revealed that 45.6% of Filipina American teenage students in San Diego public schools had seriously thought about committing suicide. Half of those students had actually attempted suicide. Although depression cannot be said to cause suicide, the high scores of depression and low self-esteem show a relation to the high scores of suicidal thoughts among Filipinos.

Depression in Filipinos can sometimes be difficult to notice without digging deeper into their feelings. Filipinos can display their depression in many ways such as showing extreme suffering or smiling even when it may not seem authentic. Some of the common causes of depression include: financial worries, family separation during the immigration process, and cultural conflict. One of these cultural conflicts is the belief that one must base decisions on what will "save face" for the family. A study was published in 2018 by Janet Chang and Frank Samson about Filipino American youth and their non-Filipino friends. They had found that Filipino American youth with three or more close non-Filipino friends were more likely to experience depression and anxiety more so than Filipino American youth with two or less non-Filipino friends that they considered to be close. Although having friends of diverse backgrounds gave these Filipinos a sense of inclusion among their peers, they also gained a heightened awareness of discrimination.

=== Veterans ===
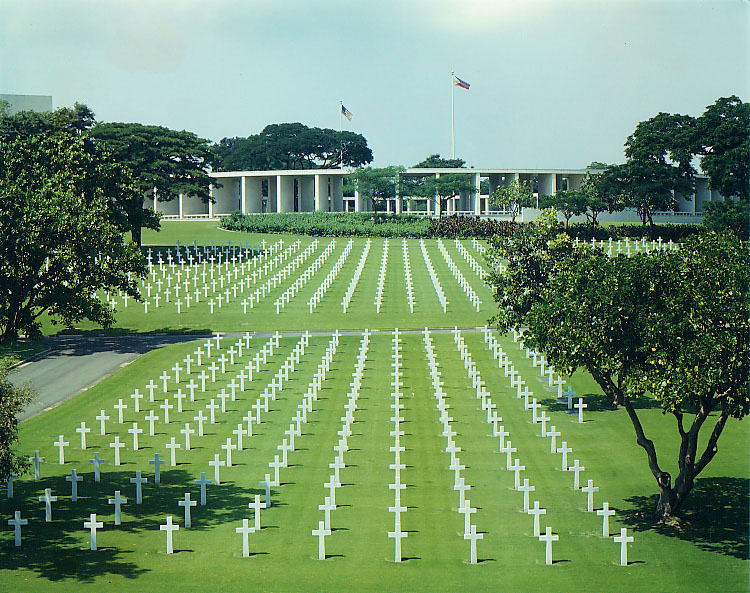
Manila American Cemetery and Memorial

During World War II, some 250,000 to 400,000 Filipinos served in the United States Military, in units including the Philippine Scouts, Philippine Commonwealth Army under US Command, and recognized guerrillas during the Japanese Occupation. In January 2013, ten thousand surviving Filipino-American veterans of World War II lived in the United States, and a further fourteen thousand in the Philippines, although some estimates found eighteen thousand or fewer surviving veterans.

The US government promised these soldiers all of the benefits afforded to other veterans. However, in 1946, the United States Congress passed the Rescission Act of 1946 which stripped Filipino veterans of the promised benefits. One estimate claims that monies due to these veterans for back pay and other benefits exceeds one billion dollars. Of the sixty-six countries allied with the United States during the war, the Philippines is the only country that did not receive military benefits from the United States. The phrase "Second Class Veterans" has been used to describe their status.

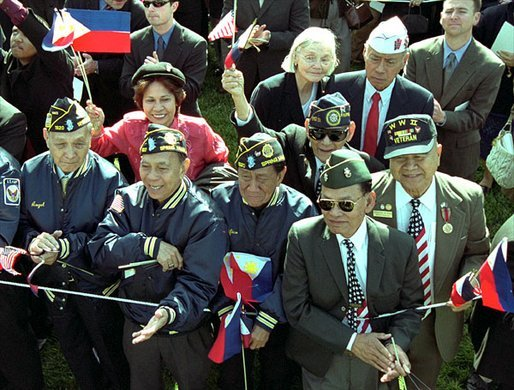
Filipino-American World War II veterans at the White House in 2003

Many Filipino veterans traveled to the United States to lobby Congress for these benefits. Since 1993, numerous bills have been introduced in Congress to pay the benefits, but all died in committee. As recently as 2018, these bills have received bipartisan support.

Representative Colleen Hanabusa submitted legislation to award Filipino Veterans with a Congressional Gold Medal. Known as the Filipino Veterans of World War II Congressional Gold Medal Act, it was referred to the Committee on Financial Services and the Committee on House Administration. As of February 2012 had attracted 41 cosponsors. In January 2017, the medal was approved.

There was a proposed lawsuit to be filed in 2011 by The Justice for Filipino American Veterans against the Department of Veterans Affairs.

In the late 1980s, efforts towards reinstating benefits first succeeded with the incorporation of Filipino veteran naturalization in the Immigration Act of 1990. Over 30,000 such veterans had immigrated, with mostly American citizens, receiving benefits relating to their service.

Similar language to those bills was inserted by the Senate into the American Recovery and Reinvestment Act of 2009 which provided a one time payment of at least 9,000 USD to eligible non-US Citizens and US$15,000 to eligible US Citizens via the Filipino Veterans Equity Compensation Fund. These payments went to those recognized as soldiers or guerrillas or their spouses. The list of eligibles is smaller than the list recognized by the Philippines. Additionally, recipients had to waive all rights to possible future benefits. As of March 2011, 42 percent (24,385) of claims had been rejected; By 2017, more than 22,000 people received about $226 million in one time payments.

In the 113th Congress, Representative Joe Heck reintroduced his legislation to allow documents from the Philippine government and the US Army to be accepted as proof of eligibility. Known as H.R. 481, it was referred to the Committee on Veterans' Affairs. In 2013, the US released a previously classified report detailing guerrilla activities, including guerrilla units not on the "Missouri list".

In September 2012, the Social Security Administration announced that non-resident Filipino World War II veterans were eligible for certain social security benefits; however an eligible veteran would lose those benefits if they visited for more than one month in a year, or immigrated.

Beginning in 2008, a bipartisan effort started by Mike Thompson and Tom Udall an effort began to recognize the contributions of Filipinos during World War 2; by the time Barack Obama signed the effort into law in 2016, a mere fifteen thousand of those veterans were estimated to be alive. Of those living Filipino veterans of World War II, there were an estimated 6,000 living in the United States. Finally in October 2017, the recognition occurred with the awarding of a Congressional Gold Medal. When the medal was presented by the Speaker of the United States House of Representatives, several surviving veterans were at the ceremony. The medal now resides in the National Museum of American History.

== Holidays ==
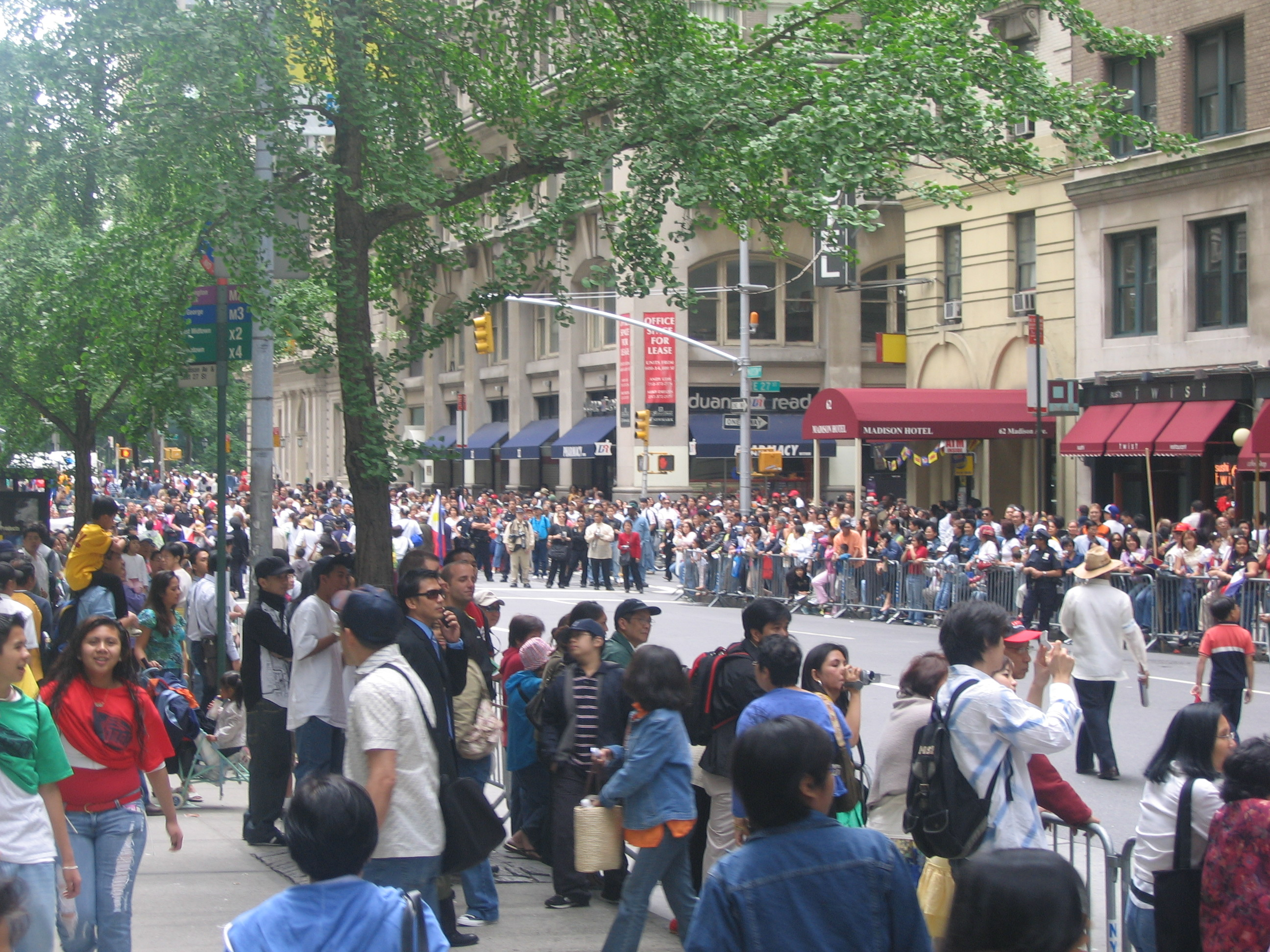
Spectators at the annual Philippine Independence Day Parade in New York City

Congress established Asian Pacific American Heritage Month in May to commemorate Filipino American and other Asian American cultures. Upon becoming the largest Asian American group in California, October was established as Filipino American History Month to acknowledge the first landing of Filipinos on October 18, 1587 in Morro Bay, California. It is widely celebrated by Filipino Americans.

Major & Regional Celebrations in the United States
Date	Name	Region
January	Winter Sinulog	Philadelphia
April	PhilFest	Tampa, FL
May	Asian Pacific American Heritage Month	Nationwide, USA
May	Asian Heritage Festival	New Orleans
May	Filipino Fiesta and Parade	Honolulu
May	FAAPI Mother's Day	Philadelphia
May	Flores de Mayo	Nationwide, USA
June	Philippine Independence Day Parade	New York City
June	Philippine Festival	Washington, D.C.
June	Philippine Day Parade	Passaic, NJ
June	Pista Sa Nayon	Vallejo, CA
June	New York Filipino Film Festival at The ImaginAsian Theatre	New York City
June	Empire State Building commemorates Philippine Independence	New York City
June	Philippine–American Friendship Day Parade	Jersey City, NJ
June 12	Fiesta Filipina	San Francisco
June 12	Philippine Independence Day	Nationwide, USA
June 19	Jose Rizal's Birthday	Nationwide, USA
June	Pagdiriwang	Seattle
July	Fil-Am Friendship Day	Virginia Beach, VA
July	Pista sa Nayon	Seattle
July	Filipino American Friendship Festival	San Diego
July	Philippine Weekend	Delano, CA
August 15 to 16	Philippine American Exposition	Los Angeles
August 15 to 16	Annual Philippine Fiesta	Secaucus, NJ
August	Summer Sinulog	Philadelphia
August	Historic Filipinotown Festival	Los Angeles
August	Pistahan Festival and Parade	San Francisco
September 25	Filipino Pride Day	Jacksonville, FL
September	Festival of Philippine Arts and Culture (FPAC)	Los Angeles
September	AdoboFest	Chicago
October	Filipino American History Month	Nationwide, USA
October	Filipino American Arts and Culture Festival (FilAmFest)	San Diego
October	Houston Filipino Street Festival	Sugar Land, TX
November	Chicago Filipino American Film Festival (CFAFF)	Chicago
December 16 to 24	Simbang Gabi Christmas Dawn Masses	Nationwide, USA
December 25	Pasko Christmas Feast	Nationwide, USA
December 30	Jose Rizal Day	Nationwide, USA
