= Manong generation =

First Filipino-American immigrant wave

The manong generation were the first generation of Filipino immigrants to arrive en masse to the United States. They formed some of the first Little Manila communities in the United States, and they played a pivotal role in the farmworker movement. The term manong comes from the Ilocano word for "elder brother", while manang means "elder sister"; these are derived from Spanish hermano/hermana, meaning "sibling".

== History ==
In 1898, the United States entered a roughly fifty year period of colonial control in the Philippines. The Spanish–American War (April–August 1898) ended Spanish colonial rule in the region, and the Philippines were ceded to the US in the Treaty of Paris. This was followed by the Philippine–American War (1899–1902), in which Filipino independence fighters, led by Emilio Aguinaldo, fought against American forces. The war was brutal, and total of 200,000 Filipino civilians died. Meanwhile, the US government, under William Howard Taft, launched a pacification campaign to win over support from Filipino elites, in 1900. This ultimately helped contribute to the defeat of the Filipino independence forces, and the war officially ended in 1902.

Following the US annexation of the Philippines, Filipinos began to emigrate to the US. In 1903, the first documented group of Filipinos emigrated to the US. The majority of Filipino immigrants were young, single males, who came to work in agricultural jobs in California and Hawaii. Many of the immigrants worked in farms and tanneries during the growing season. Some also worked in factories. The agricultural and factory work tended to be extremely physically demanding, with harsh conditions and low pay. During the agricultural off season, the manongs often worked in cities and towns, such as San Francisco, in primarily service industry and domestic roles, such as cooks, waiters, hotel bellhops, hotel "elevator boys", cleaners, chauffeurs, and house servants.

Due to anti-miscegenation laws and immigration restrictions, such as the Immigration Act of 1924, it was difficult for many of the manong generation to find partners and start families. For this reason, many chose to create communities, such as Manilatown, San Francisco, where they lived in the same neighborhood and patronized Filipino restaurants, pool halls, and community spaces. They also formed Filipino community organizations, such as Gran Oriente Filipino Masonic and Caballeros de Dimas-Alang. It was common for the manong generation to live in low-cost, single-room occupancy hotels, such as the International Hotel, when they were in cities. Many of the manongs lived their entire lives as single men.

In 1934, Filipino emigration closed down due to the passing of the Tydings–McDuffie Act. Furthermore, the act changed the status of the manongs from US citizens to aliens.

The manong generation participated in the labor and farmworker rights movement. For example, Filipino workers took part in the Delano grape strike in Delano, California, and some of the earliest meetings of the strike took place at the Filipino Hall.

In 1965, Filipino immigration to the US rose again, due to the Immigration and Nationality Act, which removed national origin quotas. This marked the end of the manong generation, as a new generation of Filipino emigrants were able to move to the US and form families, without the previous legal restrictions.
