= Filipino American theater =

Filipino American theater ranges from topics such as Filipino/Filipino-American history to modern Filipino issues. The themes for these works were mostly influenced by the Spanish colonial rule as well as the American colonization.

Philippine theater is composed of pre-colonial performance traditions as well as colonial influences from Spain and the USA.

Some common subject matter tackled by Filipino theater focuses on the historical background of the Philippines and the relationship between the Philippines and the United States. Some Filipino American productions provides personal, societal and cultural perspective from the past to now.

== Themes in Filipino American theater ==
Some themes for Filipino-American theatrical works are focused on the historical background of the country such as the Filipino-American War, Martial Law and the dawn of Filipino independence.

== Influences in the development of Philippine theater ==
The earliest form of theatrical work started with indigenous theater which mainly performs “rituals”. Although these rituals may seem purely cultural, there is also a huge religious influence over these rituals and to this day they are still practiced by specific groups. Other than tribal rituals there are also tribal dances that are practiced depict significant tribal activities within the community.

During the Spanish colonial rule within 1565 to 1898, Filipinos never failed to find a way to cope with this regime. During the colonization of Spain, Christianity heavily influenced the lives of Filipinos which lead to religious pieces and performances throughout the country. One form influenced by Spain is called komedya which varies between two themes: the secular and the religious. For example, a play called Tibag which talks about the search of Elena and Constantino for the Cross of Christ is still performed in some towns. Another religious form is the sinakulo or commonly called the passion of Christ which is usually performed during the Lenten season.

Between 1878 or 1879 another form of performance called sarsuwela was introduced to Filipinos. The main theme of sarsuwela revolves around the love story between different social classes which made the dramatization more interesting. Dalagang Bukid (1919), was the most popular piece of sarswela within the culture.

During the 19th century, Spain introduced drama which is a play that is usually done within one act. Drama mainly focuses on the contemporary lives of Filipinos. Drama had three subgroups which included: (1) melodrama which aimed to make people cry, (2) comedy which aimed for people to laugh and (3) drama simboliko which taught the audience some symbolism within the storyline.

== American influences in the development of Philippine theater ==
From 1901 to 1946, the American colonial regime affected Filipino theater. On November 4, 1901 the Sedition Act was enacted in the Philippines. With this law it was prohibited for any type of media or speech to go against the United States.

During the 1930s Filipinos were exposed to western theater and western classics. During this time, Filipinos adapted to American culture and to American theatrical standards. One influence from the occupation is the development of the performance form called bodabil which is the vernacular equivalent of "vaudeville." Bodabil is more of a mixture of songs and other type of performances that were popular in the United States.

== Filipino American theater groups ==
One Filipino American theater company is Ma-Yi Theater Company, started in 1989. Another is the National Asian American Theater Company, which involves Filipino American plays and Filipino American casts. Another organization that organizes Filipino playwrights is Sining Bayan.

== Filipino American productions ==
Sining Bayan has staged the play "Isuda Ti Muna/They Who Were First" in 1973. It mainly encircles the lives of Filipino agricultural workers in central California. The following year Mindanao (1974) came out in which talks about the land rights if Filipino Muslims and farmers in Mindanao. In 1976 a play called Tagatupad came out with a focus on the struggles of antieviction laws within the working class Filipino community. One of the most controversial plays within this time called The Frame Up of Narciso and Perez (1979) basically focuses on the murder of Narciso and Perez’ patients at a Veterans Administration Hospital. Within the same year, Visions of a War bride (1979) focused on a Filipina that came to the United States as a war bride. Years later Ti Mangyuna (1981) led by a collaboration between the KDP and ILWU Local 142 of Hawaii headlined throughout the community. With its goal to educate the audience about labor-union drive's.

In 1990 Dogeaters by Jessica Hagedorn was published which works well as a playwright. Dogeaters talks about political and cultural issues within that time.

== Issues in the Filipino American theater community ==
When the first group of Filipinos joined the theater community they also received a lot of backlash. One of the most common instances are racial issues. One of the most popular plays that had a lot of Filipino actors, Miss Saigon, had the issue of casting a white actor for an Asian role (113). With this, it exposed the history of yellow face within the theater community.

Another issue that was faced due to Miss Saigon was when it had its own production in the Philippines. J.V Ejercito, the owner of the production of Miss Saigon, became a member of the Philippine congress. J.V Ejercito's background stirred up controversies since his father Joseph Estrada was still in power when the production was going on. The public implied that the production gained its money not through profit but through politics and free enterprise. During the production of Miss Saigon, the international work force for Filipinos was also rising. Filipinos were seen as Little Brown Fucking Machines (LBFM) by military men thus giving Filipinos the roles of prostitutes within plays. Because of Miss Saigon, Filipinos were then seen as maids and domestic helpers.

== Filipino American productions in universities ==
Pilipino Cultural Night (PCN) is an event mostly organized by students in which they express cultural aspects through theatrical mediums. It was established in 1972 to celebrate the Filipino American community at California State University. California State University had their first PCN with the theme: “Anyong Pilipino: Portrait of the Pilipino”. Around the 1980s, PCN incorporated folklore dance to theatrical narratives. In the University of Hawai’i, the Fil-Am club sponsored an event called Gabi ng Pilipino (Filipino Night). It featured popular dance and musical presentations from the late 1970s to mid-1980s.

== Books about Filipino American theater ==
"Barangay to Broadway: Filipino American Theater History" by Walter Ang, published in 2018.
