= LGBTQ Filipino American culture =

LGBTQ Filipino American culture refers to the culture of LGBTQ Americans of Filipino descent.

Due to a lack of literature, research primarily focuses on gay Filipino men and, to a lesser extent, lesbian Filipino women. As such, bisexual, and transgender Filipino Americans are not well-studied.

== History ==
Filipino immigration to the United States is influenced by the Philippines' history of colonization by the United States, which continues to affect Filipino American immigrants today.

=== U.S. colonial period ===
Over the first decade of the period the Philippines was a United States colony, no regulations were put in place regarding cross-dressing with only "oblique" regulations regarding same-sex acts. In 1870 the Spanish Penal Code, which had been used as a guideline for criminal law by the Spanish colonialists, began to be used by the United States in the Philippines and was used until the 1930s. This, too, did not formally regulate sodomy, though it was informally policed despite a lack of legislation. In its place, laws against vagrancy were introduced and linked certain public spaces, such as gambling houses or cockpits, with immorality. These laws resulted in greater amounts of prosecutions of United States veterans in the Philippines than Philippine natives. Regulation of same-sex acts (e.g. sodomy) occurred only in a "limited and oblique fashion" as opposed to the manner in which it was managed in the United States mainland.

=== First-generation immigrants ===
First-generation Filipino LGBTQ immigrants, even those who immigrated at an early age, may face certain challenges as a result of their immigrant status, such as contention with the concept of coming out or of political activism. Success and "making it" in America is considered to be more important than the idea of coming out.

=== Second-generation immigrants ===
Second-generation Filipino LGBTQ immigrants may clash with their first-generation Filipino parents, resulting in adverse effects on their life in such dimensions as educational achievement. In contrast to first-generation immigrants, second-generation immigrants may have greater desire to come out.

== Views ==
=== Activism ===
Although there are prominent LGBTQ Filipino American activists, such as Richard Adams, some Filipino Americans — particularly first-generation immigrants — report a disavowing of activism or certain LGBT community events, such as gay pride parades, which are described as baklang karnabal (or carnival bakla). Cultural attitudes encouraging rapid assimilation into American society contribute to expectations contrary to activism. However, groups like the Union of Democratic Filipinos (Katipunan ng mga Demokratikong Pilipino, or the KDP) formed in 1972, have existed nonetheless.

=== Coming out ===
Coming out may be seen as "desirable" among second-generation immigrants, but for first-generation immigrants it poses potential legal trouble, particularly for undocumented immigrants. Coming out is not a cultural tenet in the Filipino American LGBT community as it is in the "mainstream" gay community and verbal declaration of one's identity is considered to be less important than pakiramdaman, or "feeling out" one's identity.

== Organizations ==
Several LGBTQ Filipino American organizations exist, some of which serve solely Filipino Americans and some of which serve Asian Americans and Pacific Islanders as a whole:

- Gay Asian Pacific Support Network
- Barangay
- Filipino American Foundation of New Mexico
- National Queer Asian Pacific Islander Alliance
- API Equality (with branches in Northern California and Los Angeles)

== Bakla and tomboys ==
Bakla is a word meaning "homosexual" in Tagalog. It is embodied by the stereotype of the parlorista, a cross-dresser who works in a beauty salon and typically denotes effeminate or cross-dressing men. Like the word faggot in the United States, it is a controversial term that may be considered offensive. In Filipino LGBTQ culture, tomboy does not refer only to a masculine girl, but can also take on the specific connotation of "lesbian."

== Beauty pageants and drag ==
Gay beauty pageants are found across the Filipino diaspora and are important sources of revenue for event organizers; entertainment for attendees; and opportunities to present one's strengths for pageant contestants.

One Filipino American drag queen is Manila Luzon, a former contestant on the television show RuPaul's Drag Race. Other Filipino queens have competed on the show, as well.

== Religion ==
The vast majority of the Philippines identifies as Roman Catholic, a faith which considers sexual activity with the same sex as sinful. As a result of the influence of Catholicism, LGBTQ Filipino American youth report "opposition to homosexuality" and "guilt and shame" of one's own homosexuality.

Some LGBTQ Filipino American immigrants modify or adapt traditional Catholicism as it is practiced in the Philippines to be congruent with their new American lifestyle, with some shifting to a more agnostic or atheistic view (perhaps a manifestation of their separation from their families). Irreligion like agnosticism and atheism is highly taboo in Filipino culture.

== Struggles ==
=== Racism ===
Gay and lesbian Asian Americans are often targeted by racism or stigmatization in the LGBTQ community. Gay Latino Americans similarly face racial stigmatization. Filipino Americans racially or ethnically are sometimes considered to fall into either or both categories, and they experience higher rates of racial discrimination than East Asian Americans with types of racial discrimination experienced comparable to Black or Latino Americans. LGBTQ Filipino Americans also report such issues as managing identifying as Asian American versus Filipino American, dealing with stereotypes due to their race and racial gender roles, and difficulties in having to "shift" identities across reference groups (such as ethnicity, sexual orientation, and gender) that they may identify with.

In 2015, same-sex marriage was legalized nationwide in the United States. Although the upheaval of the Defense of Marriage Act allowed for gay and lesbian couples to legally marry, the benefits of same-sex marriage often do not extend to Filipino/a immigrants who may be undocumented, and mainly benefit documented, middle-class White Americans.

== Scholarship ==
Some scholars of LGBTQ Filipino American culture include:

- Martin F. Manalansan IV: Professor at the University of Illinois at Urbana Champaign. His research includes Filipino immigration and queer people of color. He is the author of Global Divas and has received numerous awards, such as the Association for Asian American Studies Award for excellence in mentoring.
- Kevin Nadal: Scholar, activist, and professor. Nadal is considered to be a leading expert in the field of Filipino American mental health and his research encompasses "multicultural issues in psychology," including LGBT people of color. He founded the LGBTQ Scholars of Color network in 2015, and his areas of expertise include Filipino American identity and American LGBT issues. His publications include works like Filipino American Psychology: A Handbook of Theory, Research, and Clinical Practice and That's So Gay!: Microaggressions and the Lesbian, Gay, Bisexual, and Transgender Community.
- Anthony Ocampo: Sociologist and professor at California State Polytechnic University. He focuses on issues such as immigration, race, ethnicity, sexuality, and gender within Filipino, Latin, and Asian Americans in Los Angeles, California. He is the author of The Latinos of Asia: How Filipino Americans Break the Rules of Race, and he has contributed to other works on race and ethnicity.

== Notable people ==
- Richard Adams
- Christopher Cabaldon
- Gina Ortiz Jones
- Manila Luzon
- Glenn Magpantay
- Kevin Nadal
- Geena Rocero
- Jose Antonio Vargas
