= Manong =

Filipino title for the first-born male

Manong (Mah-nohng) is an Ilokano term principally given to the first-born male in a Filipino nuclear family. However, it can also be used to title an older brother, older male cousin, or older male relative in an extended family. The feminine "manang" is a term given to an older sister. It is a term of respect, similar but secondary to Dad or Mom, but not comparable to Mister or Ma'am, which expresses no elevated affection. A hierarchical marker, it is used to refer to any male who is older than the speaker within his or her family but it could also be used for men outside the family to convey respect.

Additionally, the male partner of an older sibling may be referred to as a manong irrespective of the speaker's age relative to the partner (i.e., a male younger than the speaker may be called manong by virtue of status and not by age difference) although this is not always necessary.

In traditional Filipino families, the manong acts as a third "parent" in the nuclear family and as one of the leaders in the extended family.

Manong/manang is arguably the derivative of the Spanish word for brother/sister - "hermano" and "hermana". The addition of "ng" and loss of "her" could have been for a variety of reasons such as regional slang.

The Tagalog equivalents are the masculine kuya (koo-yah) and the feminine ate (ah-teh).

Manong can also refer to the Ilocano manongs, laborers who migrated to the United States to work in plantations in the 1930s. Stories of the manong, Filipino migrants displaced from their homeland and faced with the racism and challenges of a foreign land, is a common theme in many Filipino-American writers' works. These include most prominently, Carlos Bulosan (America Is in the Heart), a Filipino migrant himself, and several stories by Bienvenido Santos "Scent of Apples" and "The Day the Dancers Came").

In the United States, the term has been used for the manong generation, which is used to describe the first generation of Filipino emigrants to come, en masse, to the country.

| Gender | Ilocano & Cebuano | Tagalog |
|---|---|---|
| Masculine | Manong | Kuya |
| Feminine | Manang | Ate |
