= Pensionado Act =

Act Number 854 of the Philippine Commission

Philippine Commission
- Long title: Philippine Commission's Act 854
- Passed by: Insular Government of the Philippine Islands
- Passed: 26 August 1903
- Introduced by: Bernard Moses

Summary
- Provide for select Filipinos to receive education in the United States
- Status: Expired

The Pensionado Act is Act Number 854 of the Philippine Commission, which passed on 26 August 1903. Passed by the United States Congress, it established a scholarship program for Filipinos to attend school in the United States. The program has roots in pacification efforts following the Philippine–American War. It hoped to prepare the Philippines for self-governance and present a positive image of Filipinos to the rest of the United States. Students of this scholarship program were known as pensionados.

From the initial 100 students, the program provided education in the United States to around 500 students. They would go on to be influential members of the Philippine society, with many of the alumni of the program going on to work for the government in the Philippine Islands. Due to their success, other immigrants from the Philippines followed to be educated in the United States, in excess of 14,000. Many of these non-pensioned students ended up permanently residing in the United States. In 1943, the program ended. It was the largest American scholarship program until the Fulbright Program was established in 1948.

During World War II, Japan initiated a similar program during its occupation of the Philippines, named nampo tokubetsu ryugakusei. Following the War, and Philippine independence, Filipino students continued to come to the United States utilizing government scholarships.

== Background ==
During the Spanish era of the Philippines, officially from the years 1565 to 1898, education other than that provided by religious institutions, was not generally available to the average Filipino until after 1863. Following the Spanish–American War in 1898, the Philippines was annexed by the United States due to the Treaty of Paris, and it became a territory of the United States. As a consequence, Filipinos became nationals of the United States. However, Filipinos who supported the independence of the First Republic of the Philippines clashed with American authority, and fought an unsuccessful conflict with the United States. At the behest of American soldiers, well-to-do families began to send their children to the United States for education; one example was Ramon Jose Lacson, who went on to earn his Ph.D. at Georgetown University at the age of 20. This followed a trend of well-to-do Asian families sending students to the United States, with Chinese students first coming to the United States beginning in 1847, and Japanese students coming to the United States beginning in 1866.

The first school established by the United States in the Philippines was on Corregidor. Following the establishment of the Philippine Commission, it began to pass legislation to provide for public education, primarily Act Number 74 in 1901, which established public schools. In 1902, Act Number 372 established public secondary education in each provincial capital. However, there was a lack of educators, with many soldiers taking up the task of becoming teachers. In an attempt to increase the number of educators in the Philippines, over 500 teachers from the United States were sent there aboard the USAT Thomas, arriving in 1901; these teachers would later be known as Thomasites. These teachers from the United States were also tasked to train Filipinos to become teachers; however, schools continued to have a shortage of educators.

== Passage ==
Then-Governor General William Howard Taft asked for more to be done to foster goodwill between Filipinos and Americans. On 26 August 1903, Act 854 of the Philippine Commission—the Pensionado Act—was passed. It was then passed by the United States Congress. Initially envisioned by Professor Bernard Moses in July 1900, the program was to pacify Filipino opposition following the Philippine–American War, as well as prepare the islands for self-governance, by showing the difference between Spain and the United States through exposure to American values. Additionally, the program was to expose the United States to "the best and brightest Filipino youths" to "make a favorable impression" of the Philippines in the United States.

== Implementation ==
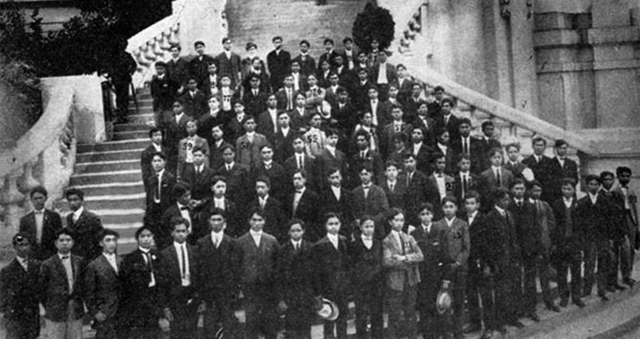
The first 100 pensionados at the 1904 St. Louis Exposition

The program was initially overseen by David Prescott Barrows, the Philippines' director of education at the time. (Note: Sources differ on how large the initial group of pensionados are. A few source says 100, other sources say 103, and some other sources say 104.) In its first year, 1903, there were twenty thousand applicants, of which about a hundred were selected. Those selected became the first pensionados, students who were accepted by this scholarship program. These early pensionados were chosen from the wealthy and elite class of Filipinos. Prior to taking college courses, the initial pensionados attended high school in the continental United States for the purpose of language and culture acclimation. In some areas of the United States, the pensionados were some of the first Filipinos to immigrate to those areas; as was the case for Chicago, New York City, Riverside, San Diego, and Ventura County, California. As much as a quarter of the initial batch of pensionados went to school in the Chicago region.

During the second year of the program, the first Pinay (Filipino woman) pensionados were chosen, numbering five out of a total of thirty-nine; this created a gender imbalance favoring Pinoy (Filipino man) pensionados. In 1904, pensionados served as guides and waiters at the Philippines exhibit at the St. Louis Exposition; there they were a contrast to the Igorots, who also represented Filipinos to the attendees of the world's fair. In 1905, only three Pinay pensionados were chosen out of a total of thirty-seven pensionados beginning the program. As the program continued, the number of pensionados steadily increased, with there being 180 pensionados in 1907, and 209 in 1912. Among the pensionados were some of the first Filipino nursing students to come to the United States. Only seven years after the program began, the initial 100 pensionados had all returned to the Philippines. Beginning in 1908, with the opening of the University of the Philippines, the program shifted its focus from undergraduate studies to graduate studies. There was a pause in the program between 1915 and 1917. In 1921, the Philippine government was supporting 111 pensionados, 13 of whom were working towards a doctoral degree.

From 1903 until 1938, pensionados traveled to the United States to study, with the majority returning to the Philippines. In 1943, the program ended. Pensionados would go on to serve within the government established in the islands by the United States; this was a scholarship requirement, and had to be at least 18 months of government service. Before returning to the Philippines, pensionados began student-run newspapers, which were part of the beginning of media geared specifically to the Filipino diaspora in the United States. While, initially, pensionados were chosen from wealthy and elite families, later pensionados were more likely not to come from wealthy families. Due to the Great Depression funding for the program was reduced. For instance, in 1930, there were but thirteen pensionados, eleven of whom were funded fully by the Philippine government, two of whom were partially funded, and another six were formerly funded by the Philippine government but remained in the United States to complete their education at their own expense. Near the end of World War II, the Commonwealth Government in Exile was offered to have some of the pensionados trained in foreign relations, anticipating the 1946 independence of the Philippines from the United States.

=== Schools attended ===
Pensionados went on to attend many colleges and universities, including the following:

- California Christian College
- Columbia University
- Cornell University
- Drexel Institute
- Harvard University
- Indiana University
- Los Angeles Junior College
- Massachusetts Institute of Technology
- Oberlin College
- San Diego Normal School
- Stanford University
- Syracuse University
- State Normal School
- University of California
  - University of California, Los Angeles
- University of Chicago
- University of Illinois
- University of Michigan
- University of Southern California
- University of Washington
- Woodbury College
- Yale University

== Impact ==
Upon returning to the Philippines, pensionados were often called "American boys" and faced discrimination from other Filipinos. This discrimination was due to the view that the returning pensionados were associated with American authority of the Philippines. Some of the later Filipino immigrants to the United States, who were not the children of the well-to-do in the Philippines like the pensionados were, shared this resentment. Carlos Bulosan, an English-language Filipino novelist and poet, wrote of this social divide. Some of the returning pensionados would go on to help the development of Filipino nationalism.

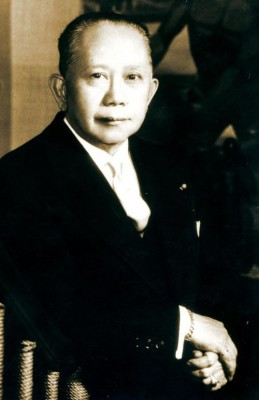
Carlos P. Romulo, a pensionado alum, soldier, and diplomat.

A majority of the returning pensionados were assigned as educators, with some later becoming superintendents. For instance, University of Michigan alum Esteban Abada became the director of education for the Philippines under the Roxas Administration; he would then go on to become a Philippine senator. Jorge Bocobo, an Indiana University alum, went on to become President of the University of the Philippines.

Returning pensionados who studied nursing established nursing schools, whose students would go on to immigrate around the world to fill nursing shortages.

Josefa Jara Martinez attended the New York School of Social Work. She would found the first school of social work in the Philippines. (Note: She later became the director of the non-governmental agency, the Philippine Rural Reconstruction Movement (PRRM) in Nueva Ecija.)

Pensionado Bienvenido Santos made his name as an author. Other pensionados took influential roles in government, including Secretary of Finance Antonio de las Alas, Senator Camilo Osias, Major General Carlos P. Romulo, and Chief Justice José Abad Santos.

When architects began to be registered in the Philippines in 1921, a pensionado was the second to be registered. Ultimately, about 500 pensionados received scholarships to be educated in the United States. (Note: Another source says that there were around 5,000 pensionados prior to 1920. Another source says that there were over 14,000 by 1938.)

=== Other students ===
The success of returning pensionados enticed others to immigrate to the United States, including non-pensionados who self-financed their higher education, including some veterans of the United States Navy. By the 1920s, these self-financed students outnumbered the pensionados. The aspiration of education advancement became a dominant theme for those Filipinos coming to the United States. Known as "fountain pen boys", by 1920 nearly five thousand Filipino students had attended American schools, receiving post-secondary education. In 1922 alone, there were almost 900 Filipinos attending college in the United States. So many Filipinos would seek to advance their education that by 1930, they were the third largest population of students from outside of the continental United States, only surpassed by Chinese and Canadian students; some of those Chinese students were attending using a similar government funding method known as the Boxer Indemnity. By 1938, around 14,000 Filipino students had received their education in the United States, some going onto important positions upon returning to the Philippines.

Some of these students would go on to fund their education as domestic workers, with some attending Chapman College and the University of Southern California, with a few earning graduate degrees. Others attempted to fund their education by working as farmworkers; one immigrant to do so was Philip Vera Cruz. Many of these self-funding students would not return to the Philippines, instead settling in the United States. E. Llamas Rosario, for example, earned graduate degrees from Columbia University and New York University and went on to found the Filipino Pioneer, a newspaper published in Stockton, California. Along with those who immigrated to the United States without educational aspirations, these Filipinos started the second wave of immigration to the United States from the Philippines. Educated Filipinos who settled in the United States faced racial discrimination when looking for jobs in their trained industries. In addition, laws barred Filipinos from professional employment, such as the ones in California which barred non-citizens the ability to gain professional licenses.

=== Similar programs ===
In 1909, due to an overpayment by China to the United States of funds for damages caused during the Boxer Rebellion, the Boxer Indemnity Scholarship was established. It has its roots in an idea proposed by Edmund James, then the Chancellor of the University of Illinois. Subsequent payments made by China to the United States relating to the Boxer Rebellion were deferred, as long as they were spent for the scholarship. A school, Qinghua Preparatory School which was jointly operated by China and the United States, was opened to train students who would be traveling to the United States. This scholarship lasted until 1937; about 2,000 Chinese students were funded by the scholarship.

During the Japanese occupation of the Philippines, the Japanese government sponsored students to study in Japan, with two groups being sent Japan in 1943 and 1944. The program was administrated out of the former American School in Japan by a part of the Ministry of Greater East Asia. Prior to departing for Japan, the students were disciplined by the Second Republic Constabulary to cleanse their thinking of anti-Japanese sentiments; this was conducted at Malacañang, but only after the students had passed individual interviews with a panel of Japanese officials which included General Wachi. In total there were a total of 51 students who studied in Japan under the program, referred to as "Nantoku" ナントク.

In 1946, after the Philippines became an independent nation, thousands more Filipinos came to the United States for education through the Fulbright Program. The Fulbright exchanges have since become a larger program than the pensionado program. A similar but smaller program funding the education of Filipinos in the United States was done under the Smith–Mundt Act, which was specific for civic leaders.

=== Inspired legislation ===
In the early 21st century, legislators have introduced bills named after the Pensionado Act in the Senate of the Philippines. In 2010, Senator Miriam Defensor Santiago submitted the "Pensionado Act of 2010", which remained in committee. In 2017, Senator Sonny Angara submitted "Pensionado Act of 2017" which was referred to committee of the Philippine Senate in the 17th Congress, with no additional action taken; following the conclusion of the 17th Congress, Senator Angara submitted similar legislation titled "Pensionado Act of 2019" to the 18th Congress of the Philippines.

== See also ==
- Education in the Philippines during American rule
- History of higher education in the United States
