= Education in the Philippines during American rule =

During the United States colonial period of the Philippines (1898–1946), the United States government was in charge of providing education in the Philippines.

== Public system of education ==
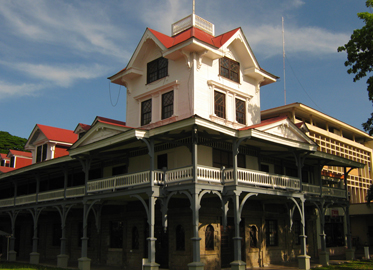
Silliman University in Dumaguete is the first American institution of higher learning to be founded in Asia

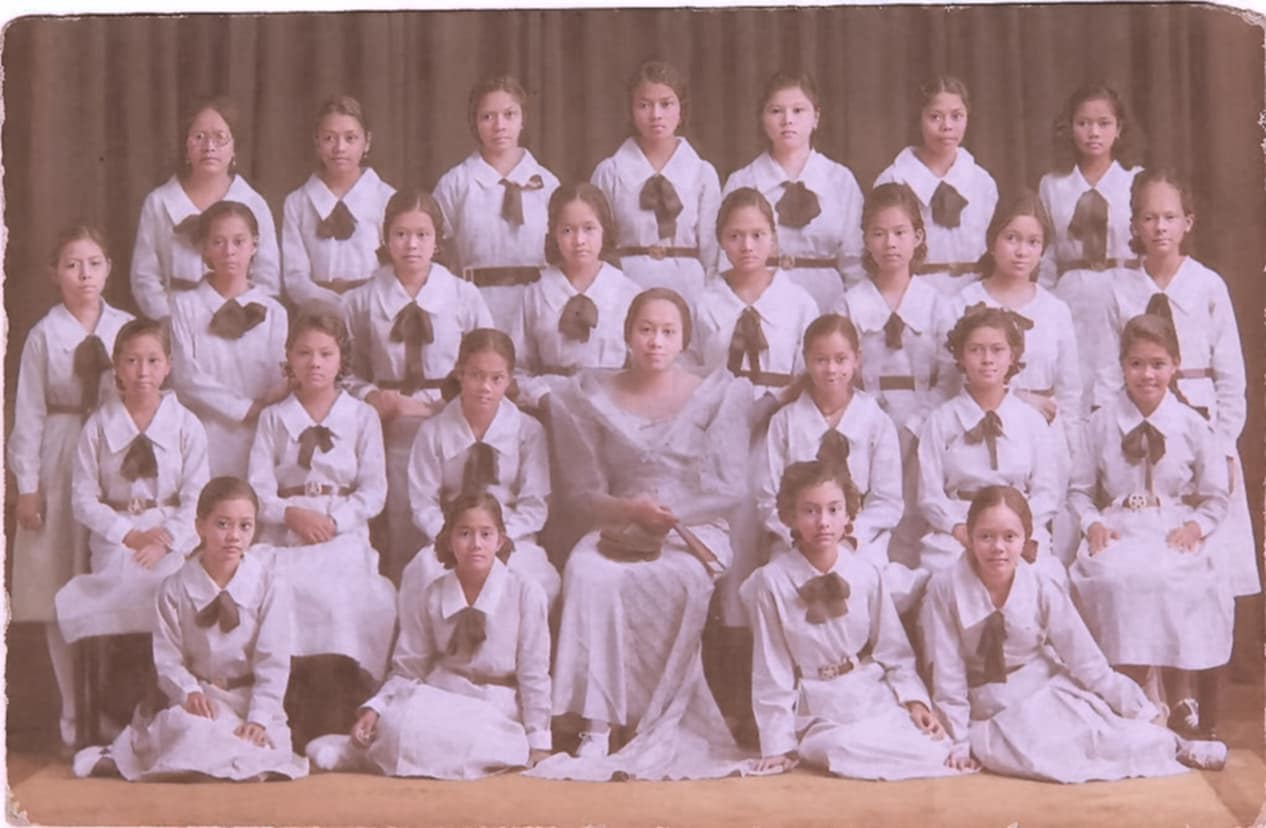
Students of the Instituto de Mujeres, Tondo, Manila Philippines 1900's

Education became a very important issue for the United States colonial government, since it allowed it to spread their cultural values, particularly the English language, to the Filipino people. On March 10, 1901, with the Philippine-American war drawing to a conclusion, Elwell S. Otis, as Military Governor, created the Department of Public Instruction. Instruction in English language, and American history, Education was expected to lead to forming of a national identity and Filipino nationalism. On January 20, 1901, Act No. 74 formalized the creation of the department.

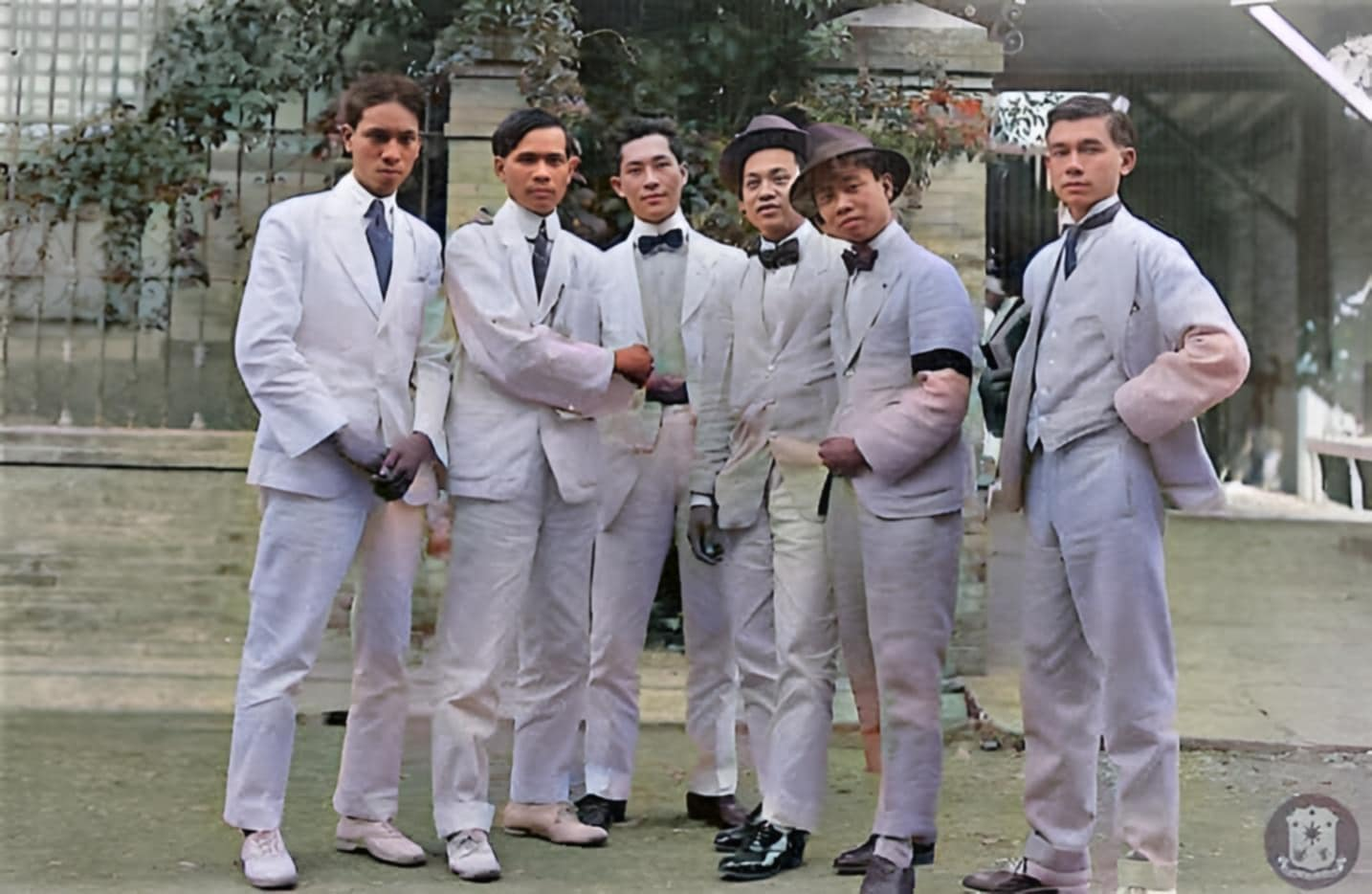
Filipino college students early 20th century

Every child from age 7 was required to register in schools located in their own town or province. The students were given free school materials. There were three levels of education during the American period. The "elementary" level consisted of four primary years and 3 intermediate years. The "secondary" or high school level consisted of four years; and the third was the "college" or tertiary level. Religion was not part of the curriculum of the schools as it had been during the Spanish period.

In some cases those students who excelled academically were sent to the U.S. to continue their studies and to become experts in their desired fields or professions. They were called "scholars" and "pensionados" because the government covered all their expenses. In return, they were to teach or work in government offices after they finished their studies. Some examples of these successful Filipino scholars were Judge José Abad Santos, Francisco Benitez, Dr. Honoria Acosta-Sison and Francisco Delgado.

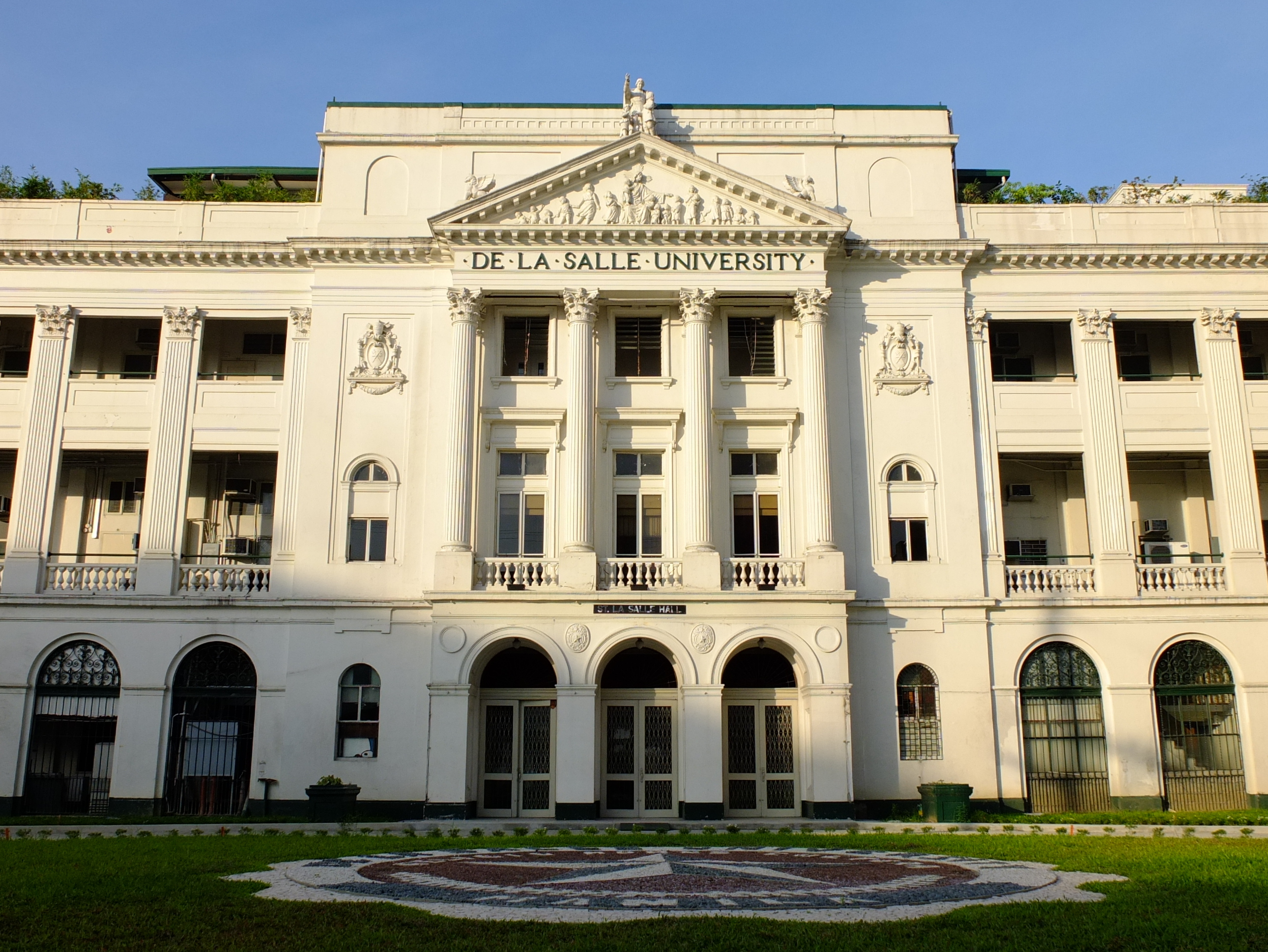
De La Salle University

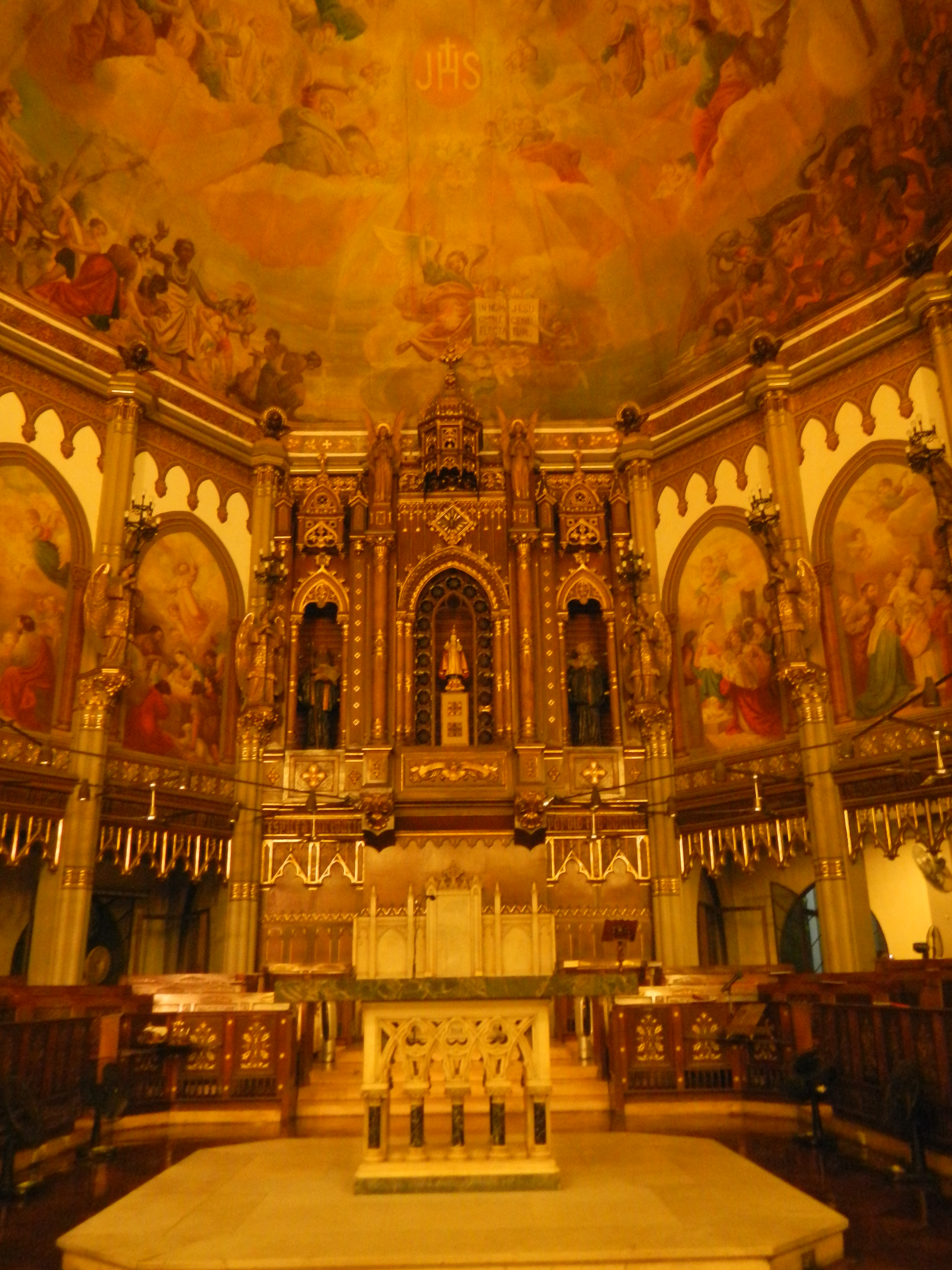
Abbey of Our Lady of Montserrat in San Beda University

Many elementary and secondary schools from the Spanish era were recycled and new ones were opened in cities and provinces, among which there were normal, vocational, agricultural, and business schools. Among the most important colleges during American rule were: Philippine College of Commerce in 1904 (now Polytechnic University of the Philippines), Philippine Normal School in 1901 (now Philippine Normal University) and other normal schools throughout the country such as Colegio Filipino (1900, now National University), Silliman Institute (1901, now Silliman University, Iloilo Normal School (1902, now West Visayas State University), Cebu Normal School (1902, now Cebu Normal University), Negros Oriental High School (1902), Capiz Home School (1904, now Filamer Christian University, the Echague Farm School (1918, now the Isabela State University) St. Paul College of Dumaguete (1904, now St. Paul University Dumaguete), Zamboanga Normal School in 1904 (now Western Mindanao State University), Jaro Industrial School (1905, now Central Philippine University), Instituto de Manila (1913, now University of Manila), Philippine Women's College (1919, now Philippine Women's University), and Institute of Accountancy (1928, now Far Eastern University. Examples of vocational schools are: the Philippine Nautical School, Manila Trade School (1901, now Technological University of the Philippines) and the Central Luzon Agriculture School. The University of the Philippines was also founded in 1908.

Schools were also built in remote areas like Sulu, Mindanao, and the Mountain Provinces, where attention was given to vocational and health practice.

== Thomasites ==
In response to the teacher shortage resulting from the creation of a centralized public education system volunteer American soldiers became the first teachers of the Filipinos. Part of their mission was to build classrooms in every place where they were assigned. In response to the teacher shortage, the Philippine Commission authorized the Secretary of Public Instruction 1,000 teachers from the United States. They began to arrive in August 1901 aboard U.S. Army Transport (ASAT) ships named Sheridan and Thomas and came to be called Thomasites.

The original batch of Thomasites was composed by 365 males and 165 females, who sailed from United States on July 23, 1901. The U.S. government spent about $105,000 for the expedition. More American teachers followed the Thomasites in 1902, making a total of about 1,074 stationed in the Philippines.

== Pensionado Act ==
The word pensionado originated with the Spanish language. It means to receive pension from the government. As the Pensionado Act started in 1903, the purpose was to "Educate and bind current and future Filipino leaders to the American colonial administration." Filipinos, mostly males, that were sponsored by the act were able to continue their education abroad and learn about American culture.

The United States government agreed to having Filipinos in the United States to acquire knowledge on Western culture and civilization. This program encouraged Filipinos to obtain education in the United States and return to the Philippines. The first year of the program there were about 20,000 applicants with only one hundred of Filipinos men ultimately selected to study abroad in the United States. About forty boys and eight girls were chosen each year in 1904 and 1905. Students were spread across the United States to participate in higher education. ... The program, which ended in 1943 and sought to train future Philippine leaders in preparation for post-World War II independence, also fostered beliefs in the supremacy of U.S. institutions, language, and white culture as compared to traditional Philippine culture.

== Criticisms ==
=== Monroe Commission on Philippine Education ===
The Monroe Commission on Philippine Education was created in 1925 with the aim of reporting on the effectiveness of the education in the Philippines during the period of U.S. annexation. It was headed by Paul Monroe, who at the time was the Director of the International Institute of Teachers College, Columbia University, and it was composed by a total of 23 education professionals, mostly from the U.S. and some from the Philippines. During 1925 the Commission visited schools all throughout the Philippines, interviewing a total of 32,000 pupils and 1,077 teachers. The commission found that in the 24 years since the U.S. education system had been established, 530,000 Filipinos had completed elementary school, 160,000 intermediate school, and 15,500 high school.

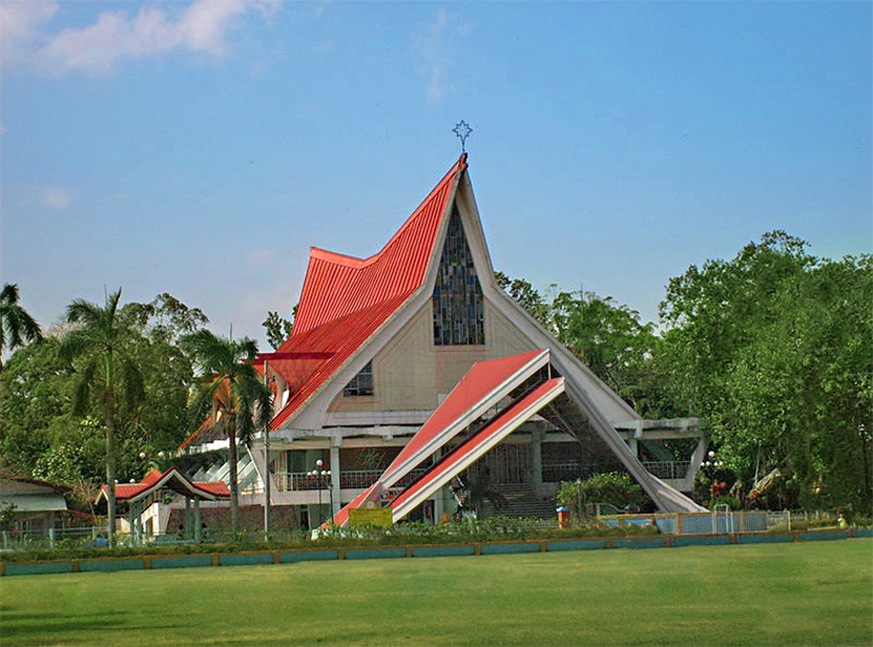
Central Philippine University, founded by the American Baptists is the second American university in Asia.

The Commission declared that although Filipino students were on the same level as their American counterparts in subjects like Math or Science, they lagged far behind in English-language related subjects. George Counts, a Yale professor and a member of the Commission wrote in 1925 in The Elementary School Journal that "Half of the children were outside the reach of schools. Pupil performance was generally low in subjects that relied on English, although the achievement in Math and Science was at par with the average performance of American school children..." Counts also described the Filipino children of the 1920s as handicapped because not only were they trying to learn new concepts in a foreign language but they were also being forced to do so from the point of view of a different culture, due to the fact that they were using materials originally designed for pupils in the United States.

The report also informed that teacher training was inadequate and that 82 per cent of the pupils did not go beyond grade 4. Many of the problems identified were attributed to the attempt to impose an English-based education system in just one generation, concluding that "Upon leaving school, more than 99% of Filipinos will not speak English in their homes. Possibly, only 10% to 15% of the next generation will be able to use this language in their occupations. In fact, it will only be the government employees, and the professionals, who might make use of English."

Other recommendations of the Commission asking for a "curtailment of the type of industrial work found on schools" and the elimination of the General Sales Department that had been set up to distribute the sale of items made in schools, pushed the implementation of several changes in the educational system to try to prioritize on the instruction of the pupils to be taught over the teaching of "industrial" education that until then had been focusing on the production of handicrafts such as basketry for boys and embroidery for girls, farming techniques, and other skills deemed favorable for the future of the pupils.

== See also ==
- Education in the Philippines
- Education in the Philippines during Spanish rule
- Department of Education (Philippines)
- Cebu Normal University
- History of the Philippines (1898–1946)
