= Little Manila, Stockton, California =

Neighborhood of Stockton, California

Little Manila is an area in Stockton, California that was inhabited by predominantly Filipino American agricultural workers from the 1930s on.

== History ==
Attracted to agricultural jobs in California's Central Valley, many young Filipino men made their homes in Stockton. The racism and discriminatory laws that persisted until the mid-1960s kept these mostly young men from pursuing the American dream of a US education, a family, and higher economic status, even barring them from crossing Main Street into what was then the exclusively white northern section of the city.

In response, these Filipino American pioneers built their own community south of Main Street. They set up businesses and organizations of all kinds to meet their own needs - restaurants, hotels, grocery stores, barber shops, the Rizal Social Club, the Daguhoy Lodge, a rescue mission, and many others, creating what became Stockton's Little Manila.

The Manongs (Ilocano: first-born male, "respected elder brothers", several other connotations), as they are affectionately called, fought for better working conditions in the fields, fair wages, and equal rights, paving the way and making life easier for the generations of Filipino Americans that followed. These men organized labor unions and successfully held strikes against exploitative growers.

Filipino labor leaders like Larry Itliong, Andy Imutan, Chris Mensalvas, Ernesto Mangaoang, Carlos Bulosan, and Philip Vera Cruz all worked out of Stockton at one time or another. Historic labor union meetings were held at the Mariposa Hotel on Lafayette Street. Mensalvas and Mangaoang were at the forefront of the ground-breaking asparagus strike that successfully concluded in 1939. Until World War II, Filipino Americans, rather than Mexican Americans, were the primary groups performing agriculture labor. These Filipino farm workers and labor leaders were the individuals behind the success of the UFW and its leader Cesar Chavez.

Because of the hardships of life in America in those days, particularly during the Depression when racially motivated violence was at its peak, few women came to the US from the Philippines. This and racist anti-miscegenation laws prohibiting marriage between men of color and white women forced most of the Manongs to remain single for most if not all of their lives. A small number were able to marry white or Mexican women by eloping to neighboring states, mainly Colorado and Texas, but they did so at their peril.

During World War II, the tide of American public opinion about the Filipinos in their midst changed when Filipinos both in the Philippines and the US fought fiercely and bravely alongside Americans. Two all-Filipino regiments of the US Army were among the most highly decorated of the war. Afterward, laws were changed, and many Manongs were able to marry and bring their brides to the US, starting families late in life and producing a generation of Filipino-Americans who knew little of their fathers' courageous struggles to survive in the US until they took college classes in Filipino-American history.

By 1946, Stockton's Little Manila was home to the largest Filipino community in the US.

In the 1950s and 1960s, large sections of Little Manila were bulldozed by the city to "improve" Stockton's downtown area. A freeway and some fast food establishments displaced many Filipino homes and establishments and disrupted community life. The freeway, locally known as the Crosstown Freeway, rerouted California State Route 4 from its previous alignment, and was widely but unsuccessfully opposed by the community, and was built in the early 1970s.

An unprecedented Filipino-American community effort succeeded in raising money to build the Filipino Plaza, completed in 1972 and now home to once-displaced neighborhood families, some businesses, and the Barrio Fiesta, an annual Filipino cultural event held in mid-August.

== Development ==
Today, the Little Manila Foundation, a Stockton-based non-profit organization, is working to reclaim and restore the last remaining buildings of the Little Manila district. Through the efforts of the Stockton FANHS and a new generation of Filipino-American leaders such as Dr. Dawn B. Mabalon, and Little Manila Executive Director, and filmmaker Dillon Delvo (both the offspring of Manongs), the Mariposa Hotel, the Rizal Social Club, the Filipino Recreation Center and the entire Little Manila District was named one of the nation's most endangered historic places of 2003 by the National Trust for Historic Preservation.

The project Little Manila Virtually Recreated was completed at the University of the Pacific in Stockton to recreate the historical Little Manila neighborhood in virtual reality.
