= Dawn Mabalon =

Filipina American historian

Dawn Bohulano Mabalon
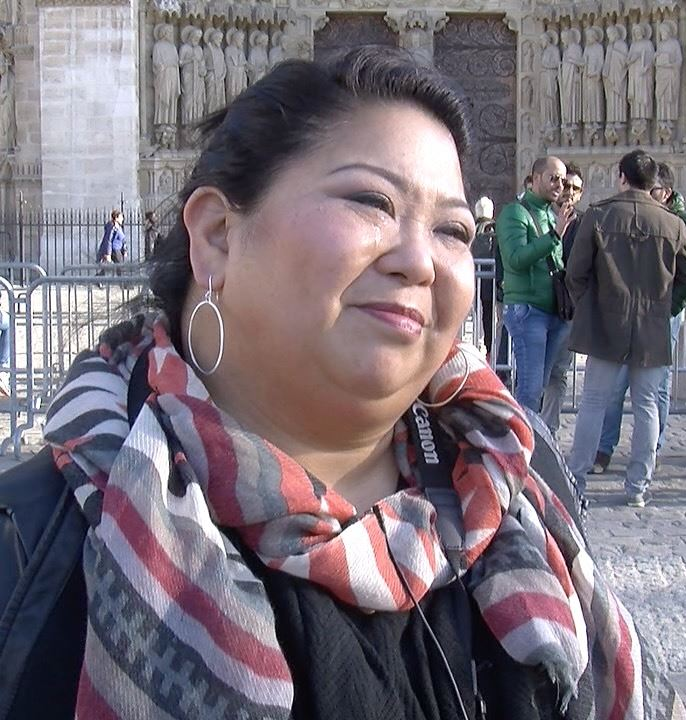
- Mabalon in Paris, November 2015
- Born: August 17, 1972; Stockton, California
- Died: August 10, 2018 (aged 45); Kauai, Hawaii
- Occupations: Professor, historian
- Spouse: Jesus Perez Gonzales

Academic background
- Education: University of California, Los Angeles; Stanford University

Academic work
- Discipline: American History
- Sub-discipline: Asian American Studies

Dawn Bohulano Mabalon (August 17, 1972 – August 10, 2018) was an American academic who worked on documenting the history of Filipino Americans. Mabalon was born in Stockton, and earned her doctoral degree from Stanford University; she later taught at San Francisco State University. Mabalon was the co-founder of The Little Manila Foundation, which worked to preserve Little Manila in Stockton, California. During her life, her work elevated the topic of the history of Filipino Americans, in Central California in particular.

== Early life and education ==
Mabalon was born on August 17, 1972, in Stockton, California, to Filipinos who had immigrated to the United States from the Philippines; her father was a guerrilla during the Japanese occupation of the Philippines. Mabalon's grandfather, Pablo "Ambo" Mabalon, ran the Lafayette Lunch Counter, an important hub in the community and one of the longest surviving Filipino American businesses in Little Manila. Many Filipinos frequented the restaurant, including Carlos Bulosan. It remained in business until 1983, and the building it had occupied was torn down in 1999. Mabalon's maternal grandmother, Concepcion Moreno Bohulano, was the first school teacher of Filipina descent in the United States. Mabalon was also the niece of Fred and Dorothy Cordova; who were involved in the founding of the Filipino American National Historical Society.

During high school, Mabalon was involved in extracurricular activities, including leading her high school's Asian Club, student council, and editor of Hi-Lite. In 1991, Malabon was involved in a January issue of Sassy, being described as a "editor-in-chief". Graduating from Edison High School, her post-secondary education involved attending San Joaquin Delta College, University of California, Los Angeles (UCLA), and earning her doctorate at Stanford University. Mabalon's master's thesis was titled "Filipina Pioneers: The Pinay in Stockton, California, 1929–1946", and was written at UCLA in 1997. Mabalon's doctoral dissertation was titled Life in Little Manila Filipinas/os in Stockton, California, 1917–1972, and published in 2003.

During her time at UCLA, Mabalon was active in the Filipino community on campus. She endorsed the effort to keep Tagalog as an available language taught at the university.

== Career ==
In 1999, Mabalon and Dillon Delvo co-founded The Little Manila Foundation in order to preserve what remained of the Little Manila neighborhood of Stockton, California.

In 2004, Mabalon became a faculty member at San Francisco State University; she was an associate professor of history. She focused her work on the history of Filipino Americans, Filipinos in Stockton, and Filipinos role in the 20th-century labor movement. In particular, she highlighted the often overlooked efforts of Filipino Americans in the 20th-century farm labor movement, which has been seen as primarily a Mexican American movement led by Cesar Chavez. Mabalon was also on the board of trustees of the Filipino American National Historical Society.

In 2010, photographs taken by Mabalon were published on SFGate about a Filipino American band Skyflakes. In 2015, Mabalon was interviewed about the November 2015 Paris attacks by Voice of America, as she and her husband were visiting the area at the time. In 2017, Mabalon, along with Gayle Romasanta, wrote a children's book about Larry Itliong called Journey for Justice: The Life of Larry Itliong; the book was published a year later. In 2018, Mabalon visited the Delano campus of Bakersfield College, which is in the area where the Delano grape strike began, for an event about archiving; at the event she spoke to encourage Filipino Americans to preserve their family histories, with the goal of expanding historical narratives.

== Honors and awards ==
In 2013, the Filipino Women's Network listed her among their "100 Most Influential Filipinas in the World". In 2014, she received an honorable mention for the Frederick Jackson Turner Award for her book Little Manila Is in the Heart; that same year Mabalon was profiled in the book Remarkable Women of Stockton.

== Death ==
In August 2018, Mabalon died while snorkeling off of Kauai. She had been vacationing with her family prior to her death. Mabalon had an asthma attack when she was out with her sister, and her inhaler did not alleviate her symptoms. She was brought out of the water and 9-1-1 was called. Paramedics attempted CPR and then transported her to an emergency room. She died at the hospital. Mabalon was buried at San Joaquin Catholic Cemetery. Mabalon was survived by her husband of ten years, Jesus Perez Gonzalez. In early October, Mabalon was memorialized at San Francisco State University.

== Legacy ==
Mabalon's work of documenting the history of Filipino Americans continued at the Little Manila Center that she had co-founded even after her death . Mabalon authored three books and was working on a fourth. Her works elevated the status of Little Manila in Stockton and helped lead to Little Manila being listed as one of America's Most Endangered Places. The San Francisco Chronicle described Mabalon as "a major figure to California's Filipino Americans".

== Bibliography ==
- Dawn B. Mabalon, Ph.D.; Rico Reyes; Filipino American National Historical So (2008). Filipinos in Stockton. Arcadia Publishing. ISBN 978-0-7385-5624-6.
- Dawn Bohulano Mabalon (May 29, 2013). Little Manila Is in the Heart: The Making of the Filipina/o American Community in Stockton, California. Duke University Press. ISBN 978-0-8223-9574-4.
- Dawn Bohulano Mabalon; Gayle Romasanta (October 2018). Journey for Justice: The Life of Larry Itliong. Bridge & Delta Publishing. ISBN 978-1-73219-932-3.
