= Claro Candelario =

Filipino labor leader

Claro Candelario (born 1905) was a Filipino labor leader of the early 1940s to the mid-1960s.

== Biography ==
Claro Candelario was born in 1905 in San Fernando, La Union, to a poor family. A good student, he excelled in school and, after two years of high school, worked for the superintendent of schools. He later to Manila for work, where he attended the Philippine Normal School. Candelario moved back to his home province and became the assistant principal of its public school.

Candelario married his childhood sweetheart, teacher Ines Nufable. They had a daughter, Angelina, and a son born May 30, 1930. That same day in 1930, Candelario boarded the Empress of Russia and traveled to Victoria, Canada wishing to improve his education and pay; his wife and children remained in San Fernando.

In 1939, Candelario moved to Stockton, California with activist Carlos Bulosan. They founded the Committee for the Protection of Filipino Rights, which advocated for naturalization rights for Filipino immigrants.

With Bulosan and other activists including Rudy Delvo, Chris Mensalvas and Larry Itliong, he helped organize cannery workers' and asparagus pickers' strikes in Stockton. Two of these asparagus strikes, in 1948–49 with Local 7, led to small pay increases for workers. In 1949, Candelario was elected president of the Filipino Community of Stockton, Inc.

Candelario also ran a restaurant called the Luzon Café. He wrote several poems about his time in America, although he claimed to have burned them.

Candelario was the inspiration for a character, also named Claro, in Bulosan's book America Is in the Heart. In the book, Claro is a restaurant owner that educates the main character in the ways of politics.
