= Ernesto Mangaoang =

Filipino American activist (1902–1968)

- Born: February 22, 1902; Aringay, La Union, Philippines
- Died: March 28, 1968 (aged 66); Seattle, Washington, U.S.
- Occupation: Labor organizer
- Known for: Organizing against discriminatory practices in the 1930s Depression era and fighting for the rights of Filipino workers to remain in the US.
- Partner(s): Lillie Catherine Bales (m. 1943; div. 1947) Barbara Jeane Sears (m. 1954)
- Children: 2
- Parent(s): Santiago Mangaoang (father); Juana Arcebal Mangaoang (mother)

Ernesto Arcebal Mangaoang (February 22, 1902 – March 28, 1968) was a Filipino American labor organizer. A communist and longtime leader of immigrant Filipino laborers, Mangaoang was closely associated with Chris Mensalvas, and was a personal friend of the famous Filipino American intellectual and activist Carlos Bulosan.

== Biography ==
Born on February 22, 1902, in Aringay, La Union, Ilocos Region, Philippines, then a colonial possession of the United States, as the second born of seven children to Santiago Medina Mangaoang (1870-1958) and Juana Benavides Arcebal (1866-1953). Mangaoang’s mother was a native of Cabugao, Ilocos Sur, where her parents, Vicente Arcebal and Juana Benavides, were also born, she was one of seven children. Mangaoang came to the United States in the 1920s, permanently settling in 1926 and finding work among the Filipino cannery workers in the Pacific Northwest. Dissatisfied with working conditions among the migrant and immigrant Filipino workers – a largely migrant workforce working in the isolated salmon canneries in Alaska in the winter and toiling in the fields of California during the summer months – Mangaoang would rise to become a leader within Filipino American workers' movement from the beginning of the 1930s.

The full trajectory of Mangaoang's work as a labor activist was compelled not merely by his awareness of the poor working conditions of the Filipino longshoremen and cannery workers, but also by an early consciousness of racial divisions among the working class responsible for debilitating the workers' movement: as white laborers occupied the top rung of the labor hierarchy, minority workers systematically endured the harshest of obstacles in seeking work during the 1930s Great Depression unemployment wave. Meanwhile, black workers were employed as strike-breakers when white workers protested dissatisfaction with their own conditions, thereby devaluing the gravity of white workers' own demands for progressive change. Terminated from work at the beginning of the Depression years, Mangaoang wrote a letter to the Oregonian in response to a report on the layoff of 60 Filipino hopyard workers: noting the systematic racism in the state's employment practices, Mangaoang concluded with a call for Filipino self-determination, linking the struggle for Filipino independence to the fight against racism in the U.S. Northwest.

Mangaoang served as President of Local 266 of the United Cannery, Agricultural, Packinghouse, and Allied Workers of America (UCAPAWA) that represented Alaska cannery workers dispatched from Portland. In 1944, Local 266 was absorbed by UCAPAWA Local 7, based in Seattle, and Mangaoang became Local 7's Business Agent. The former Business Agent of Local 266, Chris Mensalvas, would go on to become Local 7 President in 1949, continuing in the position when Local 7 became Local 37 of the International Longshore and Warehouse Union The organization is recognized as "the country's first Filipino-led union."

Filipino American organizer and labor leader Philip Vera Cruz, at the time also active in organizing the Filipino farmworkers across the West Coast region, would later recall that

Chris and Ernesto had gained so much prestige and success with labor organizing, that out of fear and outright collusion with the agricultural industry, the government even tried to discredit them. . .They were popular. . .because they were both very honest and able. . .the government tried to deport them under the McCarran Act. . ."

Seeking to implement concrete – though nonetheless radical – changes to the largely immigrant workers' conditions, the union elected a course of putting pressure on the business owners to win better pay, demand decent housing, and doing away with a system of "hold back" policy under which capitalist growers kept half of a worker's pay until the end of the growing season. The union chose to organize a workers' walkout, and, together with Chris Mensalvas, Mangaoang led the 1948 Stockton Strike in Stockton, California.

As Communists, Mangoang and other leaders of the ILWU Local 7 were arrested in 1950 – two years after the Stockton Strike – and threatened with deportation under the U.S. government's anti-communist McCarran Act. The Filipino American historian and Marxist E. San Juan, Jr. observes that at this time Filipino trade unionists, bearing a special place in the history of the Cold War-era crackdowns, were "brought to trial, harassed, and threatened with deportation."

The ILWU workers' union adopted a resolution condemning the prosecution of the labor activists, stating that

A legal strait-jacket has been tailored to fit the American people and to bind them with restrains of their liberty - the McCarran Act. Measures which all Americans thought were outlawed by the Bill of Rights. . .dismissed as the products of diseased minds when introduced in Congress in past decades, have now been rolled up into one compact law of repression and given the approval of Congress. . .

The Act provides for the jailing and possible deportation not only of aliens but of all foreign-born citizens, including those who come to this country as babes in arms. Right now four non-citizens designated as 'subversives' have been held for five months without trial in the stockade on Terminal Island in San Pedro. A recent circuit court decision denied them bail, the court holding their term in jail was entirely at the discretion of the Attorney General. . .despite the clear wording and intent of the Constitution and Bill of Rights, that define the rights of 'all persons' regardless of citizenship.

Leaders in ILWU have been singled out for attack under this law for the 'crime' of battling to raise the wages of Alaska cannery workers from $30 to $250 per month. . .

It noted that even as Mensalvas was released under a writ of habeas corpus, Mangaoang was held for 70 days before winning the right to release on bail.

Although he had been a citizen of the United States even prior to immigrating from the Philippines, the Court sought to deport Mangaoang back, citing as precedent the approved case of the deportation of Arcadio Cabebe, expelled as a non-citizen Filipino alien, as the United States had never granted United States citizenship to inhabitants of the Philippines when it semiformally annexed the islands.

Mangoang's case, known as Mangaoang v. Boyd and proceeding all the way to the U.S. Supreme Court in 1953, was a rare victory against the Red Scare of the McCarthy years: the Court upheld the appeals court decision that Mangaoang could not be deported under the Walter-McCarran Act. The attempted deportation of Mangaoang and Mensalvas was successfully fended off by lawyers from the Communist Party USA – then itself facing McCarthyite repression and charged with violating the later-repealed sections of the 1940 Smith Act.

Not wanting to bring further harassment on the ILWU and in disagreement over union activities with other members of the ILWU 37's leadership, Mangaoang resigned from the union ranks. Spending the remainder of his life working various jobs across the Northwest.

Aged 66, he died on March 28, 1968, and was cremated, his ashes were poured into the lotic waters of the southern bank of Aringay river, 100 meters west of Aringay bridge, where his father used to fish and tend his flock of ducks.
