= Little Manila Is in the Heart =

- Author: Dawn Bohulano Mabalon
- Language: English
- Genre: History
- Published: 2013 (Duke University Press Books)
- Publication place: United States of America
- ISBN: 0822353393

Little Manila Is in the Heart: The Making of the Filipina/o American Community in Stockton, California (Duke University Press, 2013) by Dawn Bohulano Mabalon is a book with three parts that depict the formation of Filipina/o American identities and community in the Little Manila in Stockton, California during the twentieth century. The book touches on issues including immigration, colonialism, race, gender, labor, and activism. Bohulano Mabalon draws on rich oral histories as well as historical archives such as the National Pinoy Archives and Filipino American National Historical Society to provide an analysis on Filipina/o experience. The book won the honorable mention for the Frederick Jackson Turner Award by the Organization of American Historians in 2014.

== Summary ==
Mabalon provides cultural, economic, and political context that led thousands of Filipina/os to migrate to Hawaii and the U.S. in the early twentieth century. After the victory in the Spanish–American War of 1898, the U.S. gained full control over the Philippines until 1946. American colonization implemented the American public school system, which inculcated Filipina/os to believe in American Dream and American exceptionalism. It also brought capitalism, which replaced the barter economy and eventually led to economic instabilities. These changes created a condition for Filipina/os to leave their motherland. Many chose to settle in Stockton, California where labor demand in farm work was steady. Despite their hopes of finding a better opportunity, what they found in the San Joaquin Delta was racial discrimination and horrible labor conditions that treated them as second class citizens. They were forced to overcome regional and linguistic differences that would otherwise separate them in the Philippines, unite as Filipina/o Americans, and fight for their rights. They established Little Manila in Stockton where they began forming fraternal organizations, labor unions, churches and community organizations in order to survive anti-Filipina/o sentiment. Little Manila was the largest Filipina/o community outside of the Philippines until its decay due to urban redevelopment and gentrification in the 1960s.

The author describes the daily life of Filipina/os between the 1930s and World War II, paying particular attention to the role of women and religion in community formation. Due to a skewed sex ratio, women were considered valuable and they took advantage of the situation to alter the restrictive traditional gender roles. They played important parts in both domestic and public spheres as caretakers, wage earners, and community organizers. By doing this, they were able to redefine femininity and family. Religion also became an important part of Filipina/o community building. As a former Spanish colony, most Filipina/os were Catholic upon their arrival. However, they converted to Protestants because Catholic churches were indifferent towards Filipina/o struggle in Stockton. Protestant missionaries provided them not only social services but also a platform for Filipina/os to organize politically and fight for fair wages.

By the end of World War II, Filipinos experienced radical changes. Their racial status ameliorated due to their military service in World War II and the removal of Japanese Americans into concentration camps. Due to Japanese business owners' and farm contractors' maltreatment and abuse of Filipino labor, Filipino workers took advantage of the incarceration of Japanese Americans to improve their work conditions and broaden the border of the Little Manila. However, these improvements and prosperity did not last too long because Stockton planned large-scale urban redevelopment projects. These projects which included freeway construction destroyed much of Little Manila, forced businesses to close, and displaced residents. Low-income residents were placed in bug-infested motels. Thus, the redevelopment projects contributed to the decay of vibrant organizations and businesses and shattering of the community. It was the new generation of Filipina/o Americans as well as immigrants who came after the 1960s that stood up against the city to demand rights on behalf of already displaced members of the Little Manila. They envisioned and campaigned for “Filipino Center” in order to provide low-income housing and hold retails by and for Filipina/os. Mabalon writes in detail the messiness of community organizing and difficulty of gaining support from both within and outside their community. After four years of struggle, they succeeded in receiving funds to construct the Filipino Center, which became a symbol of hope for community members as well as a model for other Filipino centers around the nation.

== Reception ==
The general reception of the book is positive and seen as an important contribution to Filipino American Community whose history has been treated as a marginalized American history. It provides insightful analysis to those interested in not only histories of Filipino/a American or California in the twentieth century but also immigration, gender, race, labor, activism, and colonialism. The chapter on women's role (Ch. 4) is considered a valuable addition because previous research did not pay much attention to women's contribution to community formation in Stockton in the early twentieth century. Although her work represents a fine academic rigor, Mabalon's language is accessible to non-academic readers. The extensive use of oral histories, personal stories, and photographs enrich her historical analysis as it sheds light on Filipina/o Americans' contribution to both California's agricultural development and labor movements.

== See also ==
- Filipino Americans
- History of the Philippines
- History of California
- History of Hawaii
- Race and Ethnicity in the United States
- Spanish Colonization
- Filipino Veterans
