= Chris Mensalvas =

Filipino-American union organizer

- Born: Chris Delarna Mensalvas; June 24, 1909; San Manuel, Pangasinan, Philippine Islands
- Died: April 11, 1978 (aged 68); United States
- Occupation: labor union organizer

Chris Delarna Mensalvas, also archived as Chris D. Mensalvas and Chris D. Mensalves (June 24, 1909 – April 11, 1978) was a Filipino American union organizer most active during the 1940s and 1950s. A communist and leader of the immigrant Filipino labor movement in the Pacific Northwest, Mensalvas was closely associated with famous Filipino American author and activist Carlos Bulosan as well as Ernesto Mangaoang and Philip Vera Cruz.

== Biography ==
Mensalvas was born to Juan Mensalvas and Mary Delarna in the San Manuel, Pangasinan province of the Philippines. As the third youngest son in a family of five siblings, he belonged to a group of educated Filipinos whose ownership of small plots of land became increasingly threatened by wealthy landlords The Philippines had just become a colonial territory of the United States as a result of the Spanish–American War at this time. Because trade relations between the Philippines and the United States protected both from tariffs, the Philippines experienced rapid urbanization that put pressure on the agricultural sector to be more efficient through economies of scale. His primary schooling at Lingayen, the only school in Pangasinan, and the increasing economic pressure on his family pushed him to migrate in 1927 for educational opportunities.

At first, Mensalvas aspired to attend college in the University of California, Los Angeles to be a lawyer. He provided for his tuition and board by working as a "school boy" while getting involved with the community to establish the Pangasinan Association of Los Angeles. Dissatisfied with the discrimination and racism that he experienced as a Filipino immigrant, he ended up dropping out after three years to work in the farms. Despite the racial and gender discrimination that prevented him from access to opportunities, his years as a student still endowed him status and credibility within the Filipino community.

"I thought I was going to complete my education here. I went to school in LA to be a lawyer. But I finally found out that Filipinos cannot practice law in this country. They cannot even own farms, nothing we can do. I got so disgusted I said, "Why am I studying law when I can't practice law in the United States.["] So I quit. I spent three years in college. And then I went to organize people on the farms.

In those three years, his exposure to communism and labor activism prepared him to work as the business agent for Local 266 of the United Cannery, Agricultural, Packinghouse, and Allied Workers of America (UCAPAWA), which represented Filipino-American Alaska cannery workers based in Portland. After the death of his second wife, Margie Leitz, from childbirth in 1947, he served Local 7, based in Seattle, as their publicity director for a year before moving to Stockton to lead efforts in the 1948 Stockton Asparagus strike. The strike ended up being disastrous notwithstanding the subsequent court cases that drained the union members of their financial resources.

Local 266 merged with Local 7 to become Local 37 of the International Longshore and Warehouse Union (ILWU) in what is known as dual unionism. Local 37 would go on to be recognized as "the country's first Filipino-led union" and he served as President of the merged entity from 1949 to 1959.

In 1952, Mensalvas invited Carlos Bulosan to edit the yearbook for ILWU Local 37. The yearbook celebrates the leftist political orientation of the union, and attributes its victories against the government legislations of Taft-Hartley and the McCarran International Security Act to inter-union solidarity and dedication to liberalism.

== Ties to Communism ==
During the McCarthy Era, Mensalvas and other leaders of the ILWU Local 7, including Ernesto Mangaoang, were arrested and charged for being associated with the Communist party. The McCarran International Security Act of 1950 required the registration of any individual with communist associations. Once registered, immigration officials filed a motion to reclassify communists as "subversive" aliens, which are considered grounds for deportation. Chris Mensalvas was released under habeas corpus and he made plans to move to the Philippines after the event. Not wanting to bring more attention to the case, he temporarily settled in Hawaii to participate in the Longshoremen's Union there as a business agent and staff organizer.

He returned to Seattle's Chinatown and spent the rest of his days running for positions in the Cannery Workers Field Labor Union, filling in the role of trustee in 1976.

He died on April 11, 1978, from a fire in his Downtowner Apartments room. Cause of death is smoke inhalation.
