= Lupe Martinez =

American labor leader and civil rights activist

- Born: January 10, 1945 (age 81)
- Occupations: Labor leader; Civil rights activist
- Children: Michelle, Sheila and Joseph
- Awards: Farmworker Advocate Hall of Fame (2017)

Lupe Martinez (born January 10, 1945) is an American labor leader and civil rights activist. He has spent his entire career advocating for the living and working conditions of migrant and seasonal farm workers.

Martinez serves as chairman of the National Farmworker Alliance; chair of MAFO, a national partnership of farmworker and rural organizations; president of the Wisconsin Farmworkers Coalition; chair of the Governor's Council on Migrant Labor in Wisconsin; board member for Farmworker Justice; board member of the National Council of La Raza; and as president and chief executive officer of United Migrant Opportunity Services (UMOS) for over 45 years.

== Early life and career ==
Martinez was a migrant worker whose family traveled throughout the Midwest harvesting crops. He was one of 10 siblings in a family of migrant workers and accepted the responsibility of paying bills and managing the family finances. As a young man, Martinez organized and marched side-by-side with Cesar Chavez during the grape boycott of the 1970s.

In 1974, Martinez was appointed as President/CEO of UMOS. At that time, UMOS was a single state, single-focused migrant serving agency only. As of 2019, UMOS is nationally recognized organization, administering over forty programs. UMOS is the largest Hispanic-managed, non-profit organization in Wisconsin, and one of the largest in the United States. UMOS operates throughout the state of Wisconsin, as well as in Minnesota, Missouri, and Texas.

Martinez is a member of the executive committee of the Milwaukee Area Workforce Investment Board. Every month, 20,000 people, on average, walk through the doors of the UMOS Job Center in Milwaukee for employment related services. Martinez founded the Latina Resource Center, the first and is still the only comprehensive center that provides domestic violence, sexual assault and human trafficking supportive services under one roof, targeted to Hispanic women.

In 1993, Martinez was a pallbearer of Cesar Chavez' casket for his "final march" of 40 acres on the land where Chavez hosted his first fast that brought the farm workers movement national attention. In 2002, Martinez worked with the Racine Unified School District to found the Cesar Chavez School of Excellence, a public charter school.

Martinez was appointed to the Wisconsin Council on Migrant Labor by Governor Jim Doyle, and reappointed to the committee by Governor Scott Walker. Martinez was also appointed to the State Advisory Council on Early Childhood Education and Care.

=== Awards and honors ===
In April 2014, Lupe Martinez presented the MAFO Lifetime Achievement Award to Arturo Rodriguez who succeeded Cesar Chavez as President of United Farmworkers.

Martinez received the Lifetime Achievement Award presented by the Hispanic Professionals of Greater Milwaukee. Martinez was honored with the Cesar Chavez Humanitarian Award from the widow of Chavez, and received the World Citizen Award from the International Institute of Wisconsin. In 2015, Martinez was named as a "Champion for Migrant Workers" by the Spanish Journal.

In 2016, Martinez was named as "the most influential Latino in the state of Wisconsin" by OnMilwaukee. In 2017, Martinez was inducted into the Farmworker Advocate Hall of Fame. In a tribute to UMOS on its 50th anniversary, Congresswoman Gwen Moore said of Lupe Martinez during a session of Congress that "Mr. Martinez is dedicated to advocating and providing programs and services to improve employment, provide education opportunities as well as health and housing supports for UMOS' clientele whether they are migrant and seasonal farm workers or other underserved populations." Madison365 wrote that Martinez would be a highly eligible candidate should he seek the office of Governor of Wisconsin.

Martinez is depicted with the faces of other Latino leaders in the mural at Shorewood High School.

== See also ==
- List of civil rights leaders
- Union organizer
