= America Is in the Heart =

1946 novel by Carlos Bulosan

- 1973 edition
- Author: Carlos Bulosan
- Language: English
- Genre: Autobiography
- Publication date: 1946
- Publication place: United States
- ISBN: 0-295-95289-X

America Is in the Heart, sometimes subtitled A Personal History, is a 1946 semi-autobiographical novel written by Filipino American immigrant poet, fiction writer, short story teller, and activist, Carlos Bulosan. The novel was one of the earliest published books that presented the experiences of the immigrant and working class based on an Asian American point of view and has been regarded as "[t]he premier text of the Filipino-American experience." In his introduction, journalist Carey McWilliams, who wrote a 1939 study about migrant farm labor in California (Factories in the Field), described America Is in the Heart as a “social classic” that reflected on the experiences of Filipino immigrants in America who were searching for the “promises of a better life”.

== Plot ==
Born in 1913, Bulosan recounts his boyhood in the Philippines. The early chapters describe his life as a Filipino farmer "plowing with a carabao". Bulosan was the fourth oldest son of the family. As a young Filipino, he once lived on the farm tended by his father, while his mother was separately living in a barrio in Binalonan, Pangasinan, together with Bulosan's brother and sister. Their hardships included pawning their land and having to sell items in order to finish the schooling of his brother Macario. He had another brother named Leon, a soldier who came back after fighting in Europe.

Bulosan's narration about his life in the Philippines was followed by his journey to the United States. He recounted how he immigrated to America in 1930. He retells the struggles, prejudice, and injustice he and other Filipinos had endured in the United States, first while in the Northwestern fisheries then later in California. These included his experiences as a migrant and laborer in the rural West.

== Themes ==
Bulosan's America Is in the Heart is one of the few books that detail the migrant workers' struggles in the United States during the 1930s through the 1940s, a time when signs like "Dogs and Filipinos not allowed" were common. The struggles included "beatings, threats, and ill health". In this book, Bulosan also narrated his attempts to establish a labor union. Bulosan's book had been compared to The Grapes of Wrath except that the main and real characters were brown-skinned. Despite the bitterness however, Bulosan reveals in the final pages of the book that because he loved America no one could ever destroy his faith in his new country. In this personal literature, Bulosan argued that despite the suffering and abuses he experienced, America was an unfinished "ideal in which everyone must invest (...) time and energy, (...) this outlook leaves us with a feeling of hope for the future instead of bitter defeat." According to Carlos P. Romulo when he was interviewed by The New York Times, Bulosan wrote America Is in the Heart with "bitterness" in his heart and blood yet with the purpose of contributing "something toward the final fulfillment of America".

== Publication history ==
After the 1946 printing, America Is in the Heart was republished by the University of Washington Press in 1973. Because of its subtitle "A Personal History", America Is in the Heart is regarded as an autobiography. However, according to P.C. Morantte, a friend of Bulosan, the work had to be "fictionalized", incorporating real characters in the story and adding fictional details. Thus, it was described by Morantte as "30% autobiography, 40% case history of Pinoy life in America, and 30% fiction". A Filipino translation of the book, Nasa Puso ang Amerika, was published in 1993.

== Historical context ==
=== Great Depression ===
As can be evidenced by Carlos Bulosan’s America Is in the Heart, the life of a Filipino migrant worker during the Great Depression was anything but easy. In reality, the life of any Filipino in the United States during this time period was “lonely” and “damned,” as Bulosan described in a letter to a friend. When he and his friend José arrived in California in 1930, “the lives of Filipinos were cheaper than those of dogs.” As the Filipino population grew and the Great Depression worsened, the anti-Filipino movement flourished. This attitude towards Bulosan and his people was led by the same forces that previously condemned the Chinese and the Japanese, and in 1928, the American Federation of Labor encouraged an “exclusion” of the race, which was warmly received in Congress. Despite the fact that most of these immigrants were modernized and able to speak more than one European language, there was a persistent tendency to portray them not only as primitive savages but also sexual threats against white women.

The anti-Filipino sentiment that plagued the American mindset during this time period can be observed in a few separate events. The most violent and well-known incident occurred in California in 1930: four hundred white vigilantes attacked a Filipino night club, injuring dozens and killing one. In 1933, California and twelve other state legislatures restricted Filipino-white marriages. Lastly, in 1935 the Welch Bill offered a fixed sum of cash to pay for the fare of Filipinos who would voluntarily go back to the Philippines. Events such as these prove the anti-Filipino sentiment that afflicted Carlos Bulosan and the rest of the Filipino population.

Without the tribulations of a migrant life during the Great Depression, Bulosan would not have been compelled to write down his thoughts, nor would he have aligned so heavily with the Communist party. The Great Depression in western America was the cause of strong bonds between culture groups and families and further fueled the racial tensions between the white farm owners and the migrant workers. As documented in Bulosan's novel, “fraternity is not limited to biological brothers; the network of young migrant men from the same region serves not only as a microcosm of the Filipino community, but as a gallery of alternative lives and fates...” Because of this connection, when Carlos’ brothers and fellow Filipino workers began to join the Communist party, the only logical response was to follow suit.

Bulosan's novel compares to other works written by authors who lived through the Great Depression in that the combination of a strong racial identity and the exposure to the harsh working environments caused the protagonist to desire something more from life. Bulosan “came to represent the ‘voice of Bataan’,” because of this strong desire, fueled by the obstacles caused by the Great Depression. Bulosan's writings reached a wide audience, a number of whom were feeling similar strife due to the state of the nation's economy. The agriculture community in the West, especially in California, was characterized by a deficit in jobs and a life of transience. Bulosan's writing provides an accurate first-hand description of the uncertainty of a migrant's life, and while there is speculation about the amount of truth in his writing, one cannot deny that he was exposed first-hand to the struggles of The Great Depression.

== Filipino-American literature ==
=== Bulosan's message ===
America Is in the Heart serves as a piece of activist literature. It sheds light on the racial and class issues that affected Filipino immigrants throughout the beginning of the twentieth century. The autobiography attempts to show Filipino Americans the structure of American society and the oppression inflicted upon Filipino's living in America. E. San Juan, Jr., in “Carlos Bulosan, Filipino Writer-Activist”, states, “American administrators, social scientist, intellectuals, and others made sense of Filipinos: we were (like American Indians) savages, half childish primitives, or innocuous animals that can be either civilized with rigorous tutelage or else slaughtered outright”. In America Is in the Heart, Bulosan properly shows the reader the animalistic treatment that was inflicted upon the Filipino's on the west coast. Bulosan states, “At that time, there was ruthless persecution of the Filipinos throughout the Pacific Coast”. He wants Filipinos and even white Americans to realize the harmful treatment of Filipinos and the problems of society.

Bulosan continues his activism through irony in his novel. “Behind the triumphant invocation of a mythical 'America' linger the unforgettable images of violence, panicked escape, horrible mutilation, and death in Bulosan's works”. Throughout his novel, Bulosan mentions the death and violence that is inflicted upon Filipino immigrants. After being informed of a labor camp being burned down, he states, “I understood it to be a racial issue, because everywhere I went I saw white men attacking Filipinos”. He later stated, “Why was America so kind and yet so cruel?” Though America was supposed to be a place of freedom and kindness for Filipino Americans to escape to, Filipinos were treated like savages and were oppressed by white Americans. Bulosan makes this clear in his novel in order to present these problems to society.

=== Influence on later Filipino-American writers ===
Throughout his career, Carlos Bulosan has provided examples of the Filipino American identity that affected future Filipino American and the issues they approached. In 1942, Chorus For America: Six Filipino Poets became the first Filipino poetry anthology published in America. It was based on the works of Bulosan and five other poets. At a time when Asians were being persecuted in America, Bulosan was attempting to distinguish Filipino American struggles from the generic term “Oriental”. America Is in the Heart speaks to this struggle to retain one's identity in a new world. The graphic and gritty description of the Filipino town Bibalonan shocked the readers into realizing its distinction. It is a “damned town” where women are stoned to death and babies are left unwanted by the wayside. America Is in the Heart described the indelible mark a person's background has on his or her life, highlighting the failures of generalizing racial identities.

Ironically, it is Bulosan's success and America Is in the Heart's dominance in the study of Filipino-American literature that may have a greater impact of then his actual words. There is great debate whether the agenda for Filipino American writers should be, “to exile themselves from the home country or to accept the status of a hyphenated American or to find a bridge between the two.” King-Kok Cheung believes that Bulosan is so celebrated due to a lack of attention to Filipino American writers “whose exilic writings did not fit with the immigrant ethos” of America. One of Bulosan's most important themes as a writer was the importance to find one's identity in America. Bulosan reveals his faith and love for America in the end of America Is in the Heart. This sentiment is repeated in an essay entitled Be American, where Bulosan described American citizenship as a “most cherished dream”. Even if his writing did seem more conducive to the accepted image of immigrants, Bulosan opened the door for later writers to push the envelope of acceptance. Filipino-American writers of more recent years, such as Ninotchka Rosca and Linda Ty-Casper, have continued to highlight the complexity of a totally unified Filipino-American identity.

== See also ==
- I Walked with Heroes, an autobiography by Carlos P. Romulo
- Claro Candelario
