= Salad Bowl strike =

1970–71 farm worker strike

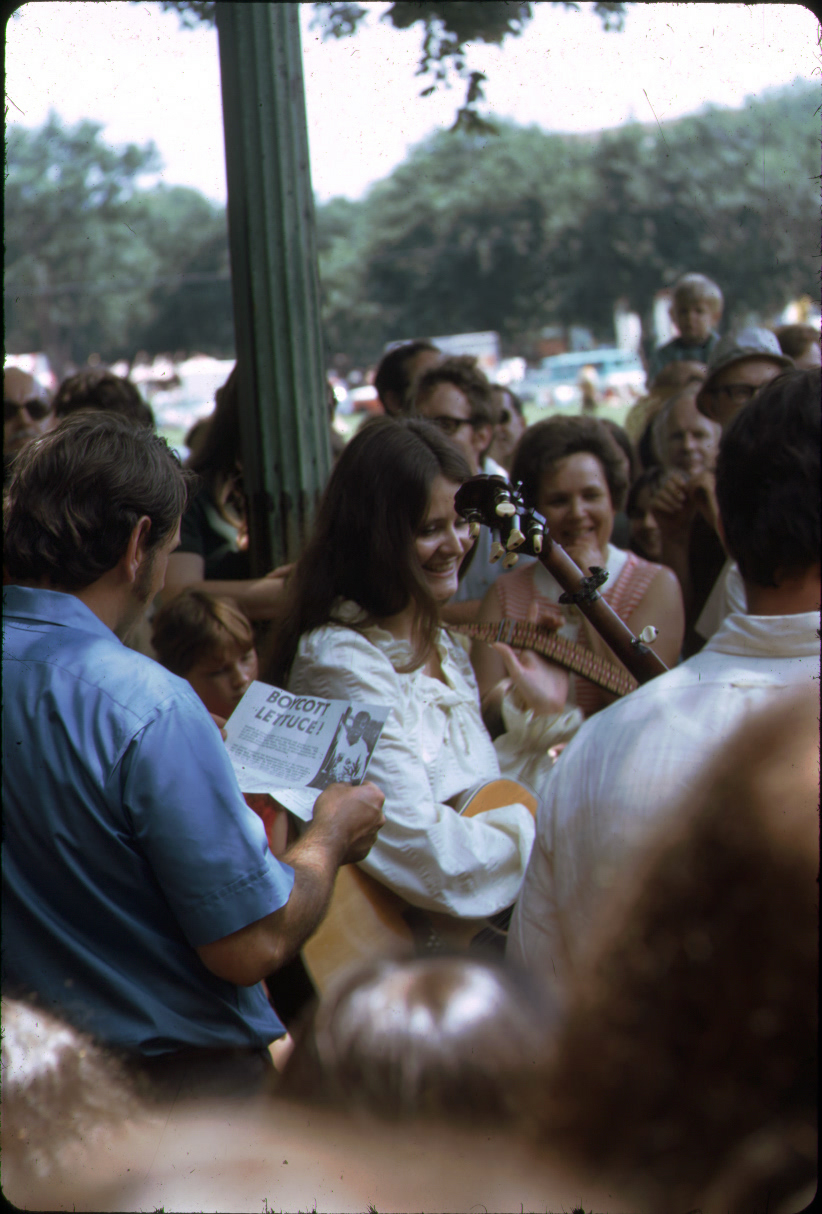
- Protestors during the Salad Bowl strike
- Date: August 23, 1970 – March 26, 1971
- Goals: Collective bargaining
- Methods: Pickets; boycott; secondary boycott

Parties
Teamsters	United Farm Workers

Lead figures
Frank Fitzsimmons	César Chávez

The Salad Bowl strike was a series of strikes, mass pickets, boycotts and secondary boycotts that began on August 23, 1970 and led to the largest farm worker strike in U.S. history. The strike was led by the United Farm Workers against the International Brotherhood of Teamsters. The Salad Bowl strike was only in part a jurisdictional strike, for many of the actions taken during the event were not strikes. The strike led directly to the passage of the California Agricultural Labor Relations Act in 1975.

== Background ==
Collective bargaining rights for most hourly workers in the United States were first given legal protection in 1933 by Section 7a of the National Industrial Recovery Act (NIRA). Although NIRA did not specifically exempt agricultural laborers from the protection of the Act, the Roosevelt administration, eager to win the political support of farm-state members of Congress, argued that farm workers were excluded. When the National Labor Relations Act (NLRA) was enacted in 1935, it specifically exempted agricultural workers due to pressure from the "farm bloc" in Congress. The NLRA was not the only federal law to discriminate against farm workers; the Social Security Act of 1935 and Fair Labor Standards Act of 1938 also excluded them. Although a number of attempts were made in the 1920s, 1930s, and 1940s to organize farm laborers, these efforts were unsuccessful.

In August 1966, the National Farm Workers Association (NFWA) and Agricultural Workers Organizing Committee (AWOC), two unrecognized and relatively minor labor unions claiming organizing jurisdiction over farm workers in California, merged to form the United Farm Workers Organizing Committee (the predecessor organization to the United Farm Workers). Adopting the philosophy of pacifism in the face of often violent reaction to its organizing efforts and engaging in strikes, hunger strikes, boycotts and secondary boycotts (including the successful Delano grape strike), marches, rallies and cutting-edge public relations campaigns, the United Farm Workers (UFW) began organizing large numbers of agricultural laborers into unions. In some cases, the UFW even won recognition and negotiated contracts.

== Strike ==
By 1969, the UFW was on the verge of winning its four years old Delano grape strike. In June 1969, about 25 small growers broke ranks with the rest of the industry, and by the end of July 1970 the strike had ended. The UFW believed that success over the Delano grape growers would lead hundreds of growers to recognize the union and negotiate contracts with the union.

But the UFW was not the only union to see the end of the Delano grape strike as an opportunity. Six thousand drivers and packing workers in the Salinas Valley in California, represented by the Teamsters, struck on July 17, 1970 effectively preventing most of the nation's summer lettuce crop from reaching consumers. The price of iceberg lettuce tripled overnight, and thousands of acres of lettuce were plowed under as crops spoiled on the ground. The strike ended on July 23, but the contract included a special agreement by the growers to give the Teamsters, not the UFW, access to farms and the right to organize workers into unions.

The UFW, which had long asserted jurisdiction over the field workers, was outraged, especially when the Teamsters signed a contract with the growers days later without having to do much organizing or build support among the workers. Even as UFW leader César Chávez went on a hunger strike to protest the Teamsters' actions and a state district court imposed a temporary injunction to preempt UFW members from walking off the job, the UFW held secret talks with the Teamsters to avert a strike by the UFW. An agreement to return jurisdiction over the field workers to the farm union was reached on August 12, and FreshPict Foods (then owned by the Purex Corporation) and Inter-Harvest (part of the United Fruit Company) broke ranks with the other lettuce growers and signed contracts with the UFW.

But the August 12 agreement collapsed, and 5,000–7,000 UFW workers struck the Salinas Valley growers on August 23 in what was the largest farm worker strike in U.S. history. (Note: "The United Farmworkers of America organized strikes and boycotts—including the 'Salad Bowl Strike,' the largest farmworker strike in U.S. history—to protest for, and later win, higher wages for farmworkers working for grape and lettuce growers.") More workers walked off the job in the next few weeks, while other unions supported the strike, shipments of fresh lettuce nationwide almost ceased, and the price of lettuce doubled almost overnight. Lettuce growers lost $500,000 a day. A state district court enjoined Chávez personally and the UFW as an organization from engaging in picketing, but both Chávez and the union refused to obey the court's orders. In late September 1970, the UFW asked consumers to join in a nationwide boycott of all lettuce which had not been picked by members of the United Farm Workers. Violence, sporadic at first but increasingly widespread, began to occur in the fields. On November 4, 1970 a UFW regional office was bombed.

On December 4 federal marshals arrested Chávez and, for the first time in his life, César Chávez was put in jail. Two days later, he was visited in the Monterey County jail in Salinas by former Olympic gold medal-winning decathlete Rafer Johnson and Ethel Kennedy, widow of slain Senator Robert F. Kennedy. Kennedy and Johnson were attacked by an anti-union mob on the steps of the jail, and only intervention by city police, Monterey county sheriff's deputies, and the Brown Berets prevented a riot and injury to the visitors. Chávez was released by the Supreme Court of California on December 23, but the next day called a strike against six additional lettuce growers.

The bitter strike ended on March 26, 1971 when the Teamsters and UFW signed a new jurisdictional agreement reaffirming the UFW's right to organize field workers.

== Impact ==
The Salad Bowl strike did not end the jurisdictional disagreement between the Teamsters and the UFW. The Teamsters resumed their dispute with the UFW in December 1972, which led to further extensive disruptions in the state agricultural industry, mass picketing, mass arrests, and extensive violence. By April 1973, the UFW was "fighting for our lives" and threatening to launch a nationwide boycott of any grower which signed a contract with the Teamsters. Thousands of UFW members began picketing in the fields on April 15, 1973. Mass arrests quickly occurred, and many county jails were soon overflowing with detainees. The organizing battles between the two unions became violent with audacious and brutal attacks on UFW members day and night. The UFW appeared to be losing the battle physically, legally, and organizationally. The violence worsened; seventy farm workers were attacked on July 31, a UFW picketer was shot on August 3, five firebombs were thrown at UFW picket lines on August 9, two UFW members were shot on August 11, and a UFW picketer was shot to death on August 16, 1973.

With the UFW beginning to buckle under the financial, legal, and organizational stress of the jurisdictional dispute, Chávez entered into talks with the Teamsters on August 6 but quit them on August 10. But the Teamsters, too, had suffered greatly (it is possible that the FBI still suspected the union of having links with organised crime and that this was bringing a lot of unwarranted attention focused onto The Mob), and the day after the peace talks ended the Teamsters shocked other unions and many growers by repudiating all the contracts they had signed since the new round of battles had begun.

Talks resumed, and a tentative agreement was reached on September 27, 1973 in which the Teamsters again agreed to leave jurisdiction over farm field workers to the UFW.

By late 1974, many observers were concluding that the UFW was no longer a viable force. In July it was forced to end picketing at some grape fields near Delano. Newspaper columnists suggested in June that the UFW no longer had any capacity to fight, and by February 1975 had concluded the union had no future.

=== Enactment of CALRA ===
The ongoing fight between the Teamsters and UFW and its effect on UFW's organizational viability led César Chávez to seriously consider and advocate for legal reform in 1974. Although Jerry Brown had been elected Governor of California in November 1974, Brown's election was not enough to win passage of legislation. The UFW knew it had to make a strong political showing in order to push the California State Legislature to act.

Although it considered mass picketing, rallies, and more boycotts, the UFW worried that it had lost the support of farm workers and that such events would only highlight the union's political weakness. Instead, the UFW settled on a 110-mile (180 km) march by a small group of UFW leaders from San Francisco to the E & J Gallo Winery in Modesto. The march would be dramatic, but not require large numbers of participants. Although just a few hundred marchers left San Francisco on February 22, 1975, more than 15,000 people had joined them by the time they reached Modesto on March 1.

The dramatic success of the Modesto march energized the farm labor movement in California, and Governor Brown quickly began pushing for labor law reform. The march may have been the capstone, but it was the Delano grape boycott's success which brought the growers to the table. "The grape boycott scared the heck out of the farmers, all of us," said one major grower. The march brought politicians and the Teamsters to the table.

Broad agreement on a bill was reached on May 7, 1975 just 68 days after the Modesto march. The California State Senate passed the bill on May 26, and the California State Assembly passed the bill two days later. Governor Brown signed the legislation into law on June 4, 1975. The act went into effect on August 28, 1975.

After hundreds of elections under the law in its first two years, the UFW and Teamsters finally signed a long-lasting jurisdictional agreement in March 1977, and the UFW ended its boycotts of lettuce, grapes, and wine in February 1978.

== Bibliography ==
- Bonifacio, Glenda Tibe (2014). Gender and Rural Migration: Realities, Conflict and Change. New York: Routledge. ISBN 9780415817387.
