= Delano grape strike =

Labor strike in California, United States

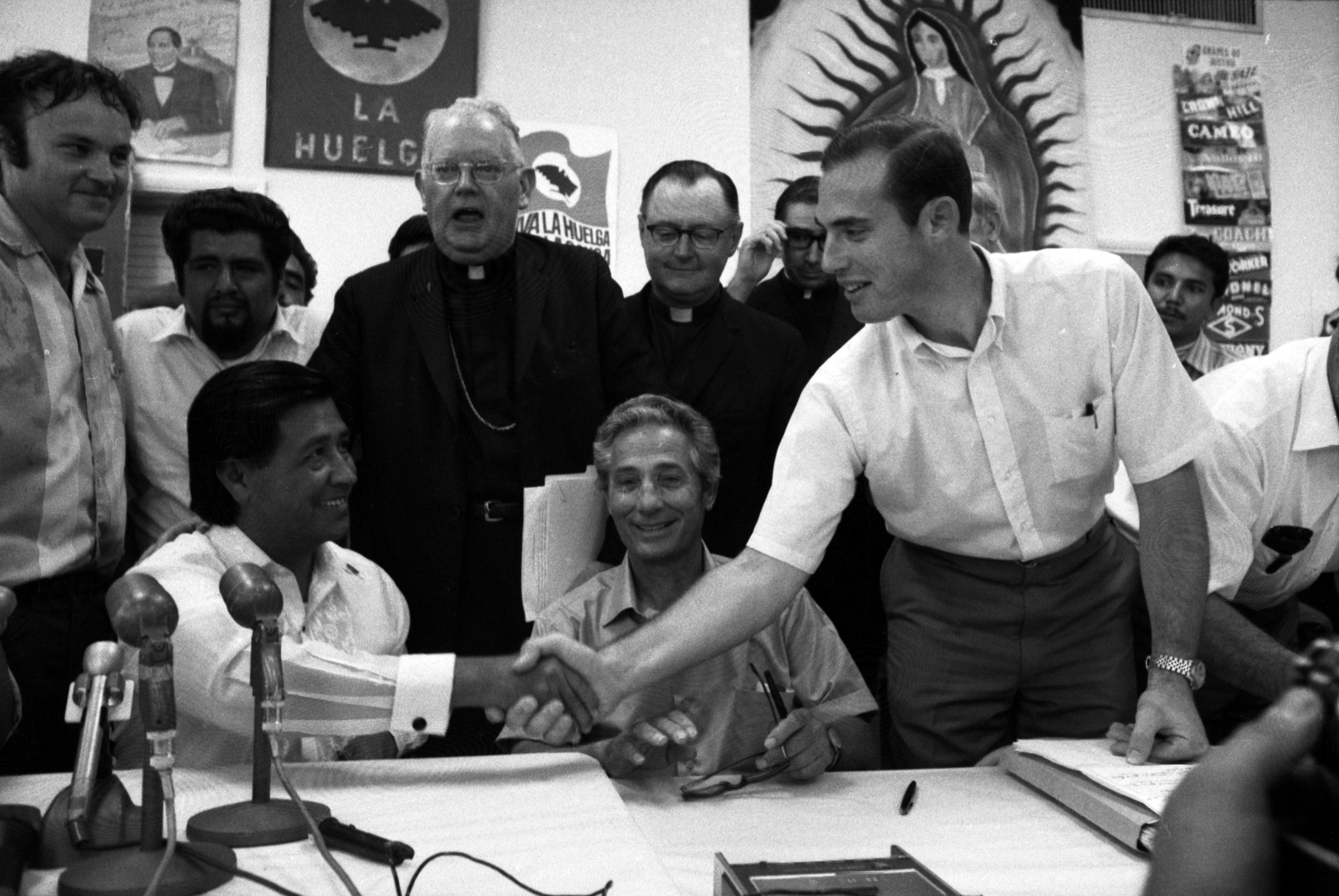
- César Chávez (seated) shakes hands with John Giumarra Jr. after signing an agreement to end the strike
- Date: September 7, 1965 – July 29, 1970
- Location: Delano, California, U.S.
- Goals: Increased wages and working conditions
- Methods: Strikes, boycotting, demonstrations
- Result: Collective bargaining agreement

Parties
1965–1966: Agricultural Workers Organizing Committee; National Farmworkers Association; 1966–1970: United Farm Workers	Table grape growers: Schenley Industries; DiGiorgio Corporation

Lead figures
Larry Itliong; Lupe Martinez; Cesar Chavez; Dolores Huerta	

Number
2,000+ Filipino Americans; 1,200+ Mexican Americans; Total: 10,000+	

The Delano grape strike was a labor strike organized by the Agricultural Workers Organizing Committee (AWOC), a predominantly Filipino and AFL-CIO-sponsored labor organization, against table grape growers in Delano, California, to fight against the exploitation of farm workers. The strike began on September 8, 1965, and one week later, the predominant Mexican National Farmworkers Association (NFWA) joined the cause. In August 1966, the AWOC and the NFWA merged to create the United Farm Workers (UFW) Organizing Committee.

The strike lasted for five years and was characterized by its grassroots efforts—consumer boycotts, marches, community organizing and nonviolent resistance—which gained the movement national attention. It received significant coverage in religious publications, and the Catholic church served as a mediator between the two sides in the later years. In July 1970, the strike resulted in a victory for farm workers, due largely to a consumer boycott of non-union grapes, when a collective bargaining agreement was reached with major table grape growers, affecting more than 10,000 farm workers.

The Delano grape strike is most notable for the effective implementation and adaptation of boycotts, the unprecedented partnership between Filipino and Mexican farm workers to unionize farm labor, and the resulting creation of the UFW labor union, all of which revolutionized the farm labor movement in America.

== Background ==
Preceding the Delano grape strike was another grape strike organized by Filipino farm workers that occurred in Coachella Valley, California, on May 3, 1965. Because the majority of strikers were over 50 years old and did not have families of their own due to anti-miscegenation laws (first overthrown in 1949), they were willing to risk what little they had to fight for higher wages. The strike succeeded in granting farm workers a 40-cent-per-hour raise, which resulted in a wage equivalent to the $1.40-per-hour wage that was paid through the recently expired braceros contracts.

After this strike, the grape harvest moved north to Arvin, where a strike was attempted at the El Rancho Farms with the NFWA. However, it was broken by police and the growers.

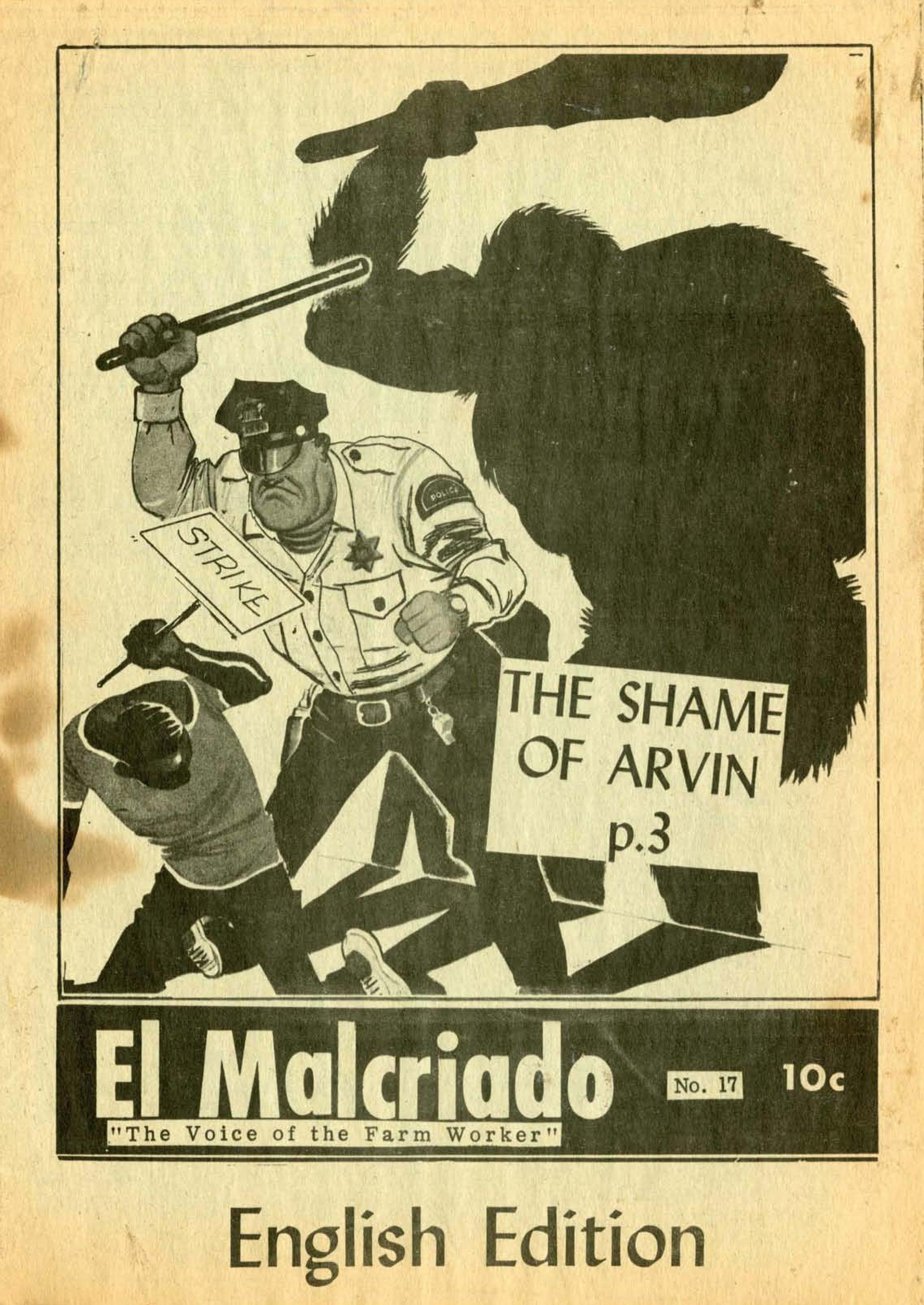
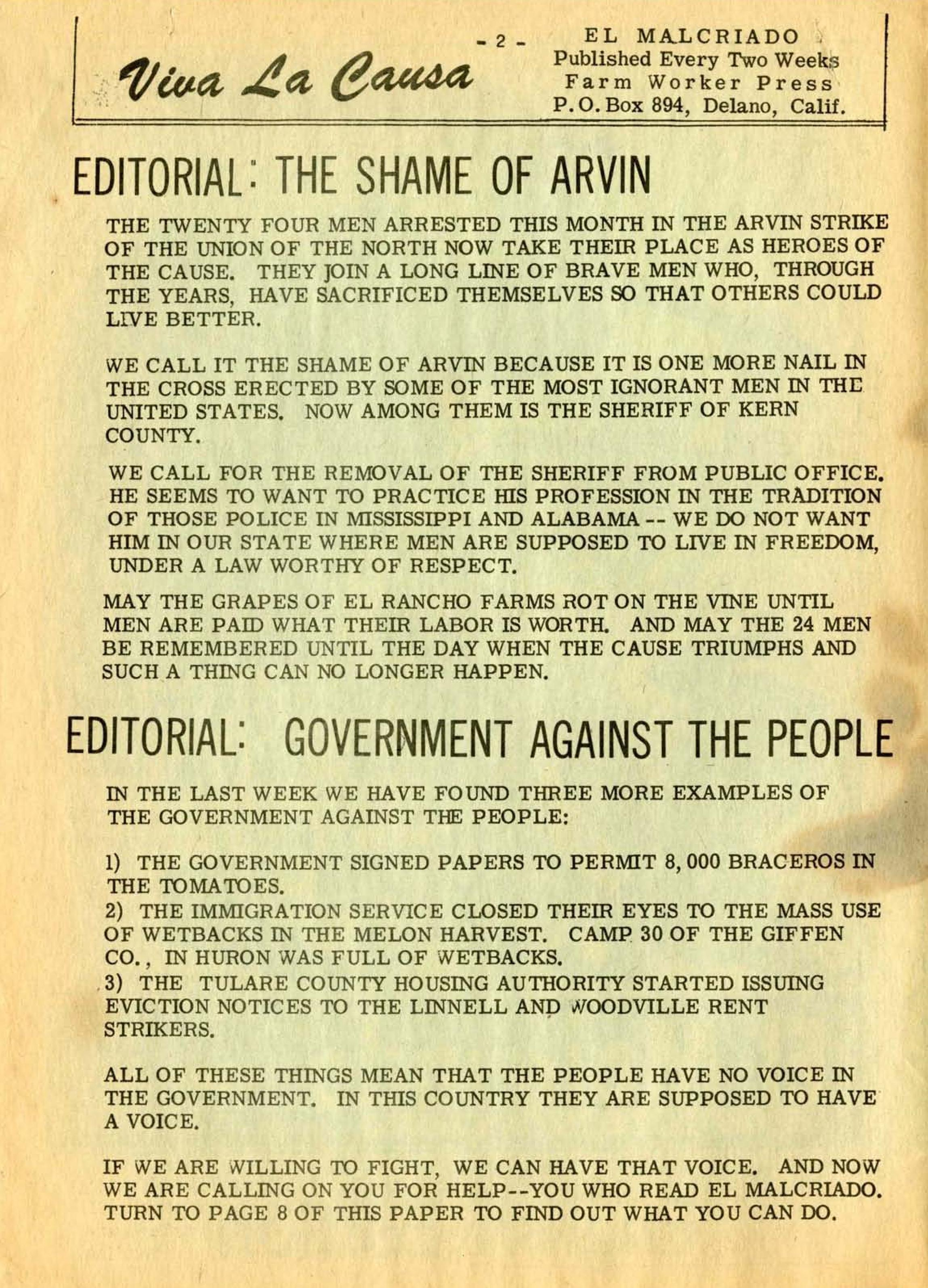
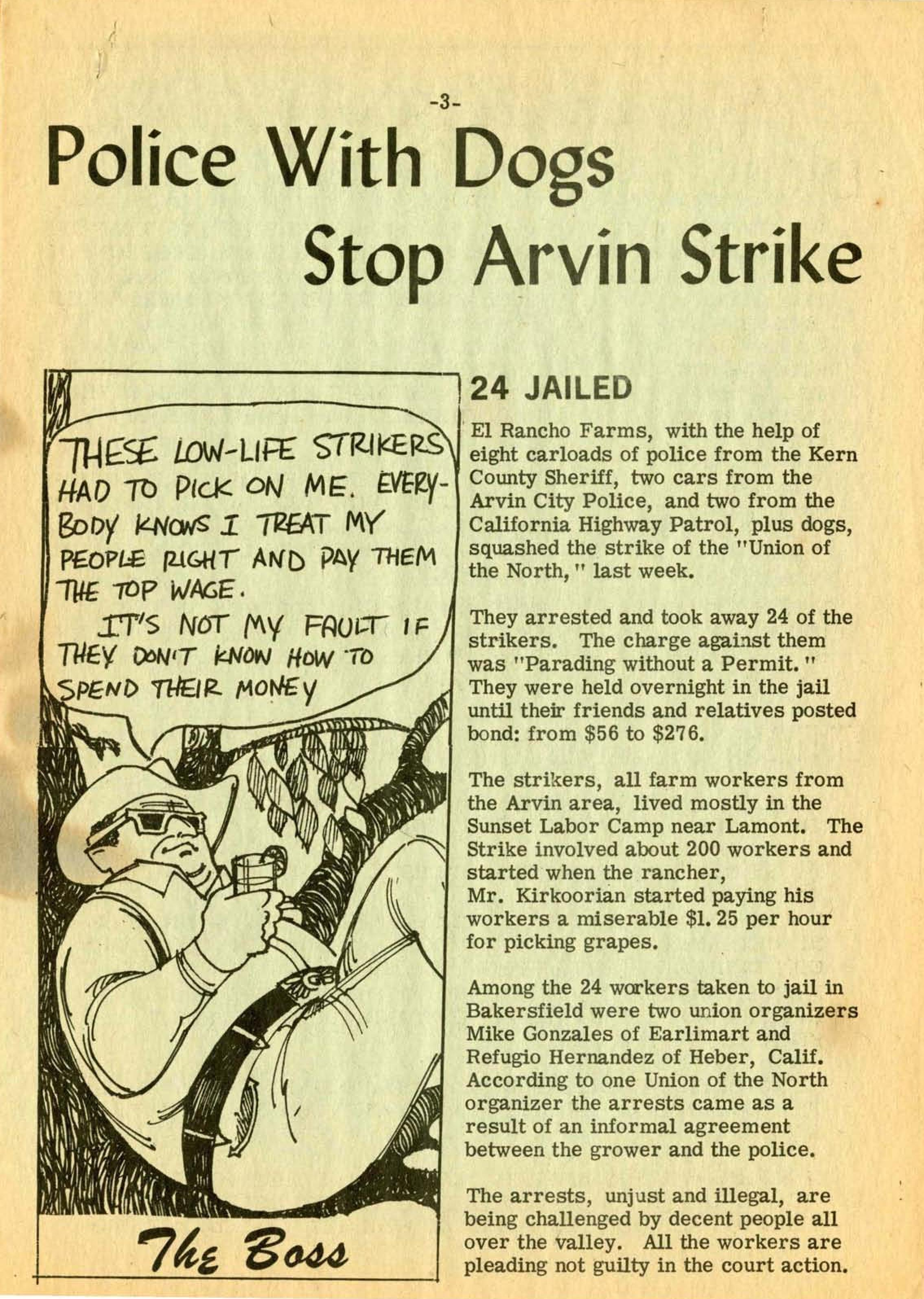
An El Malcriado article from the time of the event, the unofficial NFWA led paper of the time

Farm workers then followed the grape-picking season and moved north to Delano. The Filipino farm workers who came up from Coachella were led by Larry Itliong, Philip Vera Cruz, Benjamin Gines, and Pete Velasco under the AWOC. Upon arriving in Delano, the farm workers were told by growers that instead of being paid the $1.40-per-hour wage they received in Coachella, they would be paid $1.20-per-hour, which was below the federal minimum wage.

In addition to the low wages, the workers did not have access to health insurance, protection offered by a union, or pensions. Despite attempts at negotiation, growers were not willing to raise wages since workers were easily replaceable. This pushed Itliong, who was the leader of the AWOC, to organize Filipino farm workers and pressure growers into granting them higher wages and better working conditions. On September 7, 1965, Itliong and Filipino farm workers gathered inside Filipino Community Hall, and the AWOC unanimously voted to go on strike the next morning.

In response to the success of the strike organized by the AWOC, the NFWA organized a meeting of 1,200 Mexican farmworkers on September 16, 1965, at Our Lady of Guadalupe Church in Delano. The meeting was tactfully held on Mexican Independence Day to rouse the Mexican identity of the farmers, a technique that would go on to define the grape strike. At the meeting, there were concerns whether the NFWA could successfully mount a strike, given that they lacked the housing and meal support as seen in the strike organized by Itliong and the Filipino farmworkers.

Despite these concerns, the union voted to move forward with the grape strike. The NFWA adopted a strategy of volunteerism, nonviolence, and union networking. To illustrate, the strike was supported by Walter Reuther of the United Auto Workers Union, who provided publicity and financial support for the strike, as well as Dolores Huerta, who would go on to become a co-founder of the United Farmworkers Union when the AWOC and the NFWA merged. Huerta subsequently expanded the network of the UFW by organizing Grape boycott efforts in New York and New Jersey.

== Events ==
An excerpt around the Delano Grape strike from the 1966 documentary The Land is Rich by Harvey Richard

On September 8, 1965, Itliong, Vera Cruz, Gines, Imutan, and more than 1,000 Filipino farm workers walked off of vineyards and began their strike against Delano table grape growers. In response to strikers, grape growers hired Mexican farm workers to cross the picket lines and break the strike, a tactic typically used to create conflict and reinforce divisions between Filipino and Mexican farm workers. The farm owners also responded by closing down the camps and water supply as well as physical punishment to try to reinforce the strikers to work.

To prevent the strike from ending in failure, Itliong sought out Cesar Chavez, who was the leader of the newly established NFWA. Chavez initially declined Itliong's request because he believed the NFWA was not financially stable enough to join the strike. However, because NFWA members expressed a desire to support the Filipinos' efforts, Chavez decided to hold an emergency conference at the Our Lady of Guadalupe Church (Iglesia Nuestra Señora de Guadalupe) on September 16 to allow NFWA members to decide for themselves whether or not to join the struggle at Delano.

A crowd of more than twelve hundred supporters attended the meeting and overwhelmingly voted in favor of joining the strike, with members repeatedly chanting, "Huelga!" – the Spanish word for strike – in favor of supporting the Delano grape farmer workers. September 16, 1965 marked the day that Filipino and Mexican farm workers officially joined forces to picket together and fight for farm labor justice. This was the beginning of the nonviolent resistance for the farm workers in Delano, California.

As these strikes and marches began to happen, El Teatro Campesino was founded along its picket lines. El Teatro Campesino was a Latino theatrical company that would perform skits or "actors" at public rallies, on flatbed trucks, or in union halls. They used satire, humor, and improvisation in their skits to tell the stories of the farm workers and explain why they were fighting for their cause. The actors, who were also farmworkers, had few financial resources and limited access to theatrical aesthetics.

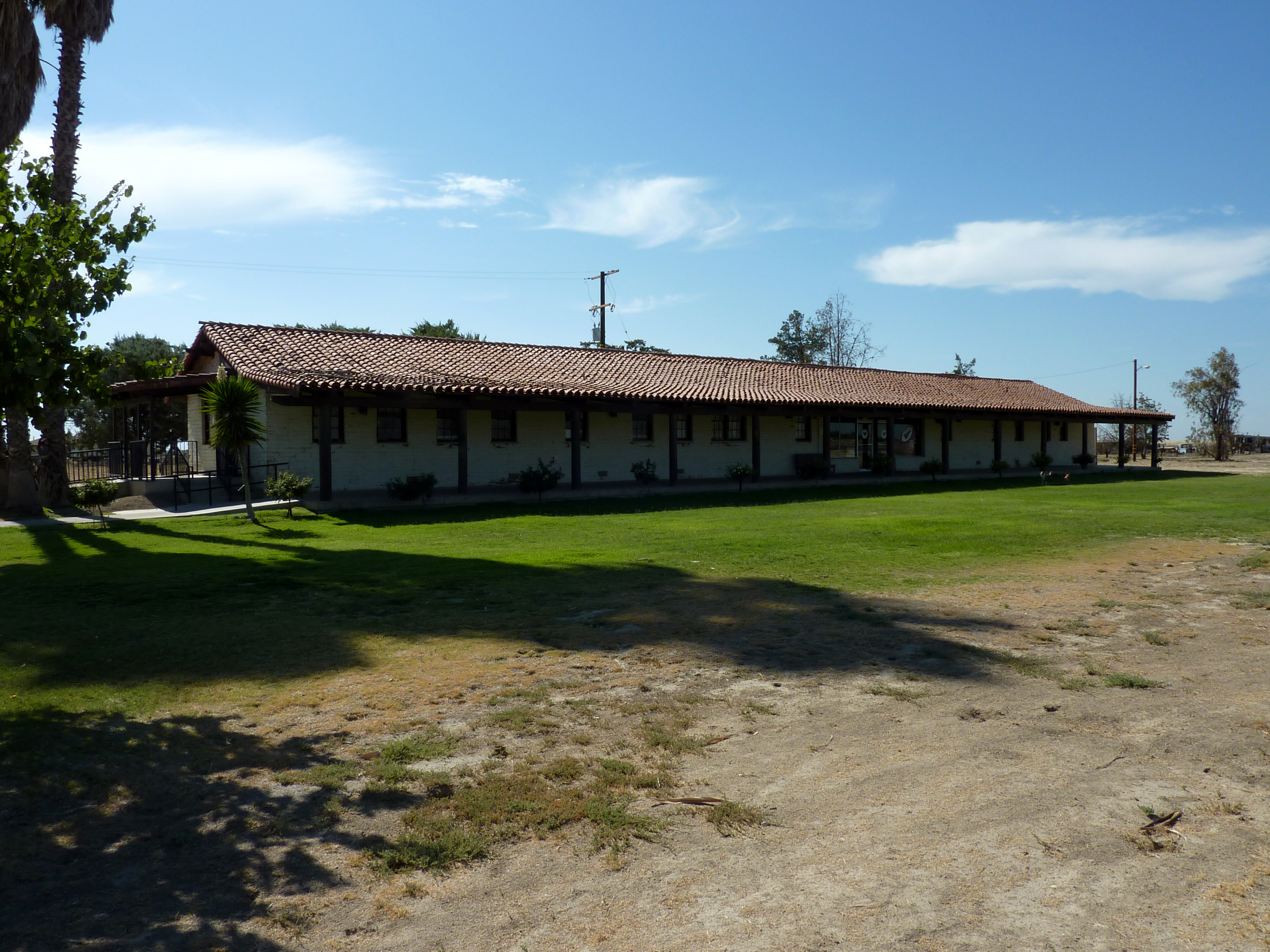
The Forty Acres complex in Delano was made a National Landmark in 2008

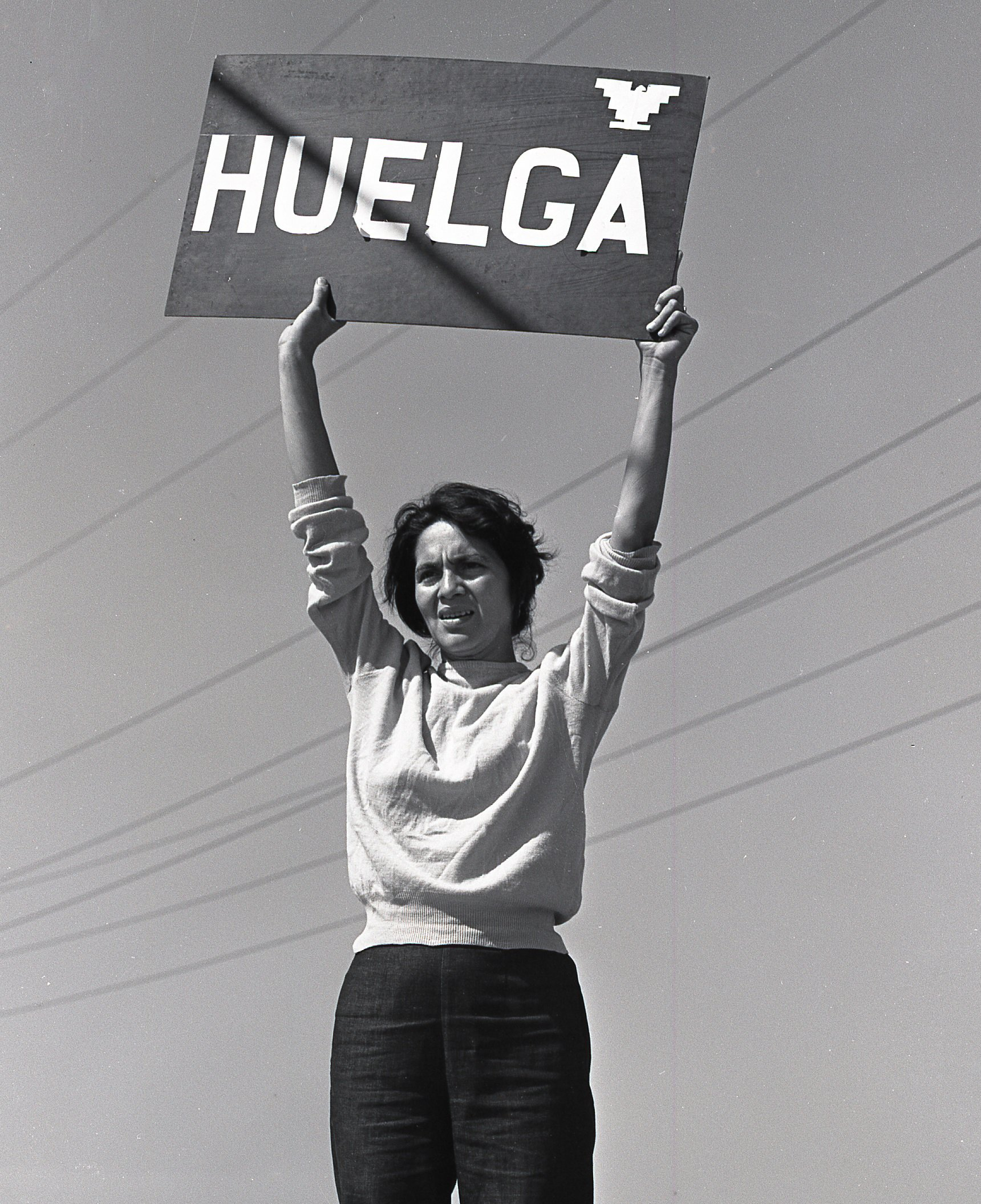
Dolores Huerta holding a Huelga (strike) sign

Inspired by marches organized by Martin Luther King Jr. and various civil rights activists; on March 17, 1966, Cesar Chavez embarked on a 300-mile pilgrimage from Delano, California to the state's capital of Sacramento. This was an attempt to pressure the growers and the state government to answer the demands of the Mexican American and Filipino American farm workers which represented the Filipino-dominated Agricultural Workers Organizing Committee and the Mexican-dominated National Farm Workers Association.

The pilgrimage was also intended to bring widespread public attention to the farm worker's cause. Shortly after this, the National Farm Workers Association and the Agricultural Workers Organizing Committee merged and became known as the United Farm Workers Organizing Committee, with Cesar Chavez and Larry Itliong being head and assistant director respectively. In August 1966, the AFL-CIO charted the UFW, officially combining the AWOC and the NFWA.

After a record harvest in the fall of 1965, thousands of California farm workers went on strike and demanded union representation elections. Many were arrested by police and injured by growers while picketing. The growers used many tactics to intimidate and harass the picketers, whom they were sure would maintain a position of nonviolence. The growers would push protesters, punch the strikers and jab their elbows into their ribs. Some growers drove their cars towards the protesters, swerving just as they reached the strikers.

There were several cases where pesticide spraying equipment was used to drench picketers with deadly surfer, which temporarily blinded them. Despite this, the UFW continued to avoid violent protest. Chavez repeatedly encouraged the people to "not react against the violence," stating that "we can change the world if we do it nonviolently." There was a lot of support towards nonviolent protest across the country and Chavez wanted to continue with that focus. The UFW sent two workers and a student activist to follow a grape shipment from one of the picketed growers to the end destination at the Oakland docks.

Once there, the protestors were instructed to persuade the longshoremen to refrain from loading the shipment of grapes. The group was successful in its course of action, and this resulted in the spoilage of a thousand ten-ton cases of grapes which were left to rot on the docks. This event sparked the decision to use the protest tactic of boycotting as the means through which the labor movement would win the struggle against the Delano grape growers.

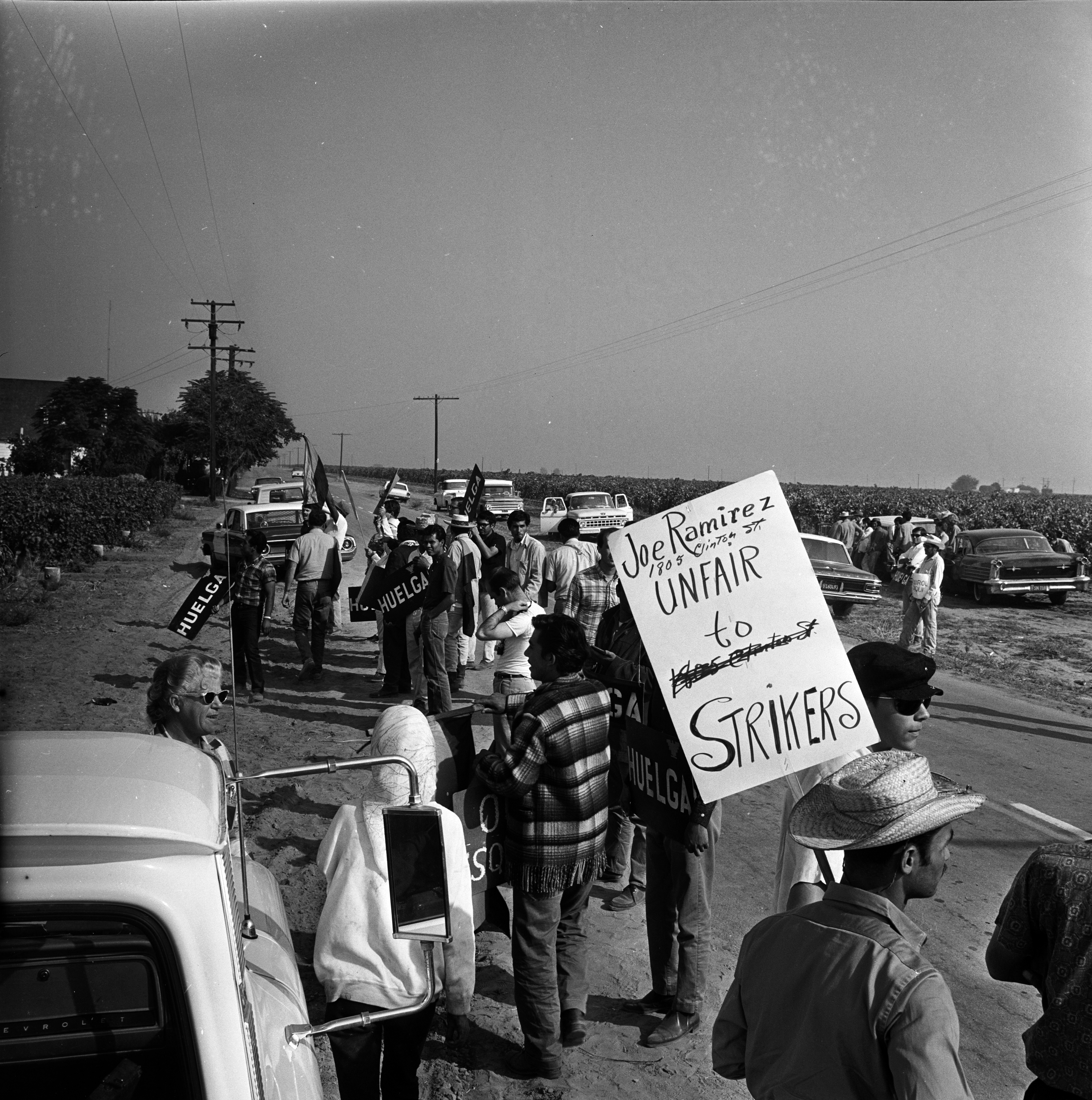
United Farm Worker's strike in Delano

This initially successful boycott was followed by a series of picket lines on Bay Area docks. The International Longshoremen's and Warehousemen's Union, whose members were responsible for loading the shipments, cooperated with the protesters and refused to load non-union grapes.

The UFW's successful boycotting campaigns in the docks inspired him to launch a formal boycott against the two largest corporations which were involved in the Delano grape industry, Schenley Industries and the DiGiorgio Corporation.

Starting in December 1965, the UFW participated in several consumer boycotts against the Schenley corporation. The increased pressure from supporters in the business sector led to the farm workers’ victory and acquisition of union contracts that immediately raised wages and established hiring halls in Delano, Coachella, and Lamont.

Following the march in 1966 from Delano to Sacramento, California; the movement gained momentum from the media coverage and support from politicians that urged negotiations to occur between the strikers and the growers. The negotiations did not follow through however, leading to a national boycott on grapes where people would refuse to buy grapes in stores in solidarity of the strike occurring. This boycott lasted until 1970 when the growers agreed to work with the laborers demands which included raising wages, creating better working conditions, and stopping child labor.

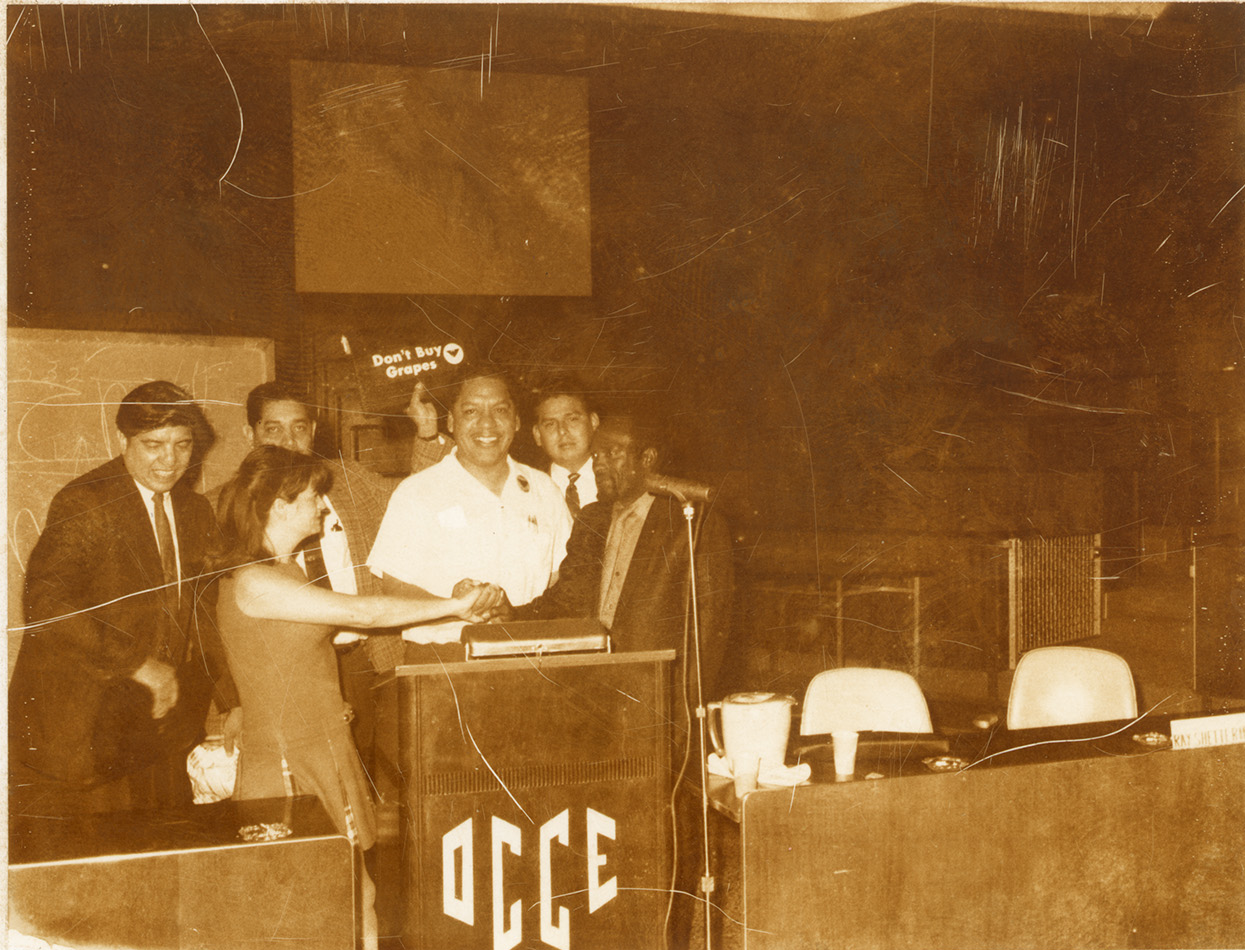
Francisco 'Pancho' Medrano speaks at conference on the boycott of grapes around 1965–1967. In the back, an unidentified man holds a sign that reads "Don't buy grapes"

The large corporations affected by the strikes led by Chavez employed fear tactics in order to protect profits. The documentary The Wrath of Grapes mentions that the Delano-based company, M Caratan Inc., hired criminals to break up farm workers voting to unionize. They attacked voters, overturned tables and even smashed ballot boxes.

The DiGiorgio Corporation was finally pressured into holding an election among its workers allowing them to choose the union they wanted to represent them on August 30, 1967. This came as a result of the boycott tactic of blocking grape distribution centers. With their products not on the shelves of retailers as a result of the boycott, the DiGiorgio Corporation was pressured to answer to the demands of the farm workers. The result of the vote favored the union representation of the UFW, a 530 to 332 vote, against the representation of The Teamsters, which was the only union that was competing against the UFW in the election.

On July 29, 1970, the grape strike and boycott ended, when grape growers signed labor contracts with the union. The contracts included timed pay increase, health, and other benefits.

=== Leadership ===
As Marshall Ganz explains in his article "Resources and Resourcefulness: Strategic Capacity in the Unionization of California Agriculture,” the UFW's leadership approached the problem of labor negotiations strategically. To maximize influence, the union welcomed and formed alliances with other unions, politicians, religious organizations (both Catholic and Protestant). The UFW also welcomed a wide variety of volunteers, from farm workers to college students, to civil rights activists, women's organizations, and even children. These volunteers donated money, ran boycotts, organized fieldside strikes, and handled the day-to-day union administration.

El Teatro Campesino, founded by Luis Valdez, used performance art to further educate and share the exploitation that picketers were enduring. The acts mocked bosses and showed the political issues. The performances used much satire and humor to tell a real cruel story. Their skits exposed the injustices towards farmers. Performers use a truck flat bed as their stage but that did not stop them from advocating and telling their truths. They performed at different picket lines for 25 days. As a result, communities felt even more enraged and this led to even more support for workers from the community.

In February–March 1968, Chavez committed to a 25-day water-only fast as a form of penance and to reaffirm the movement's commitment to nonviolence. This highly publicized act of self-sacrifice culminated on March 10, 1968, when Senator Robert F. Kennedy flew to Delano to be at Chavez's side as he broke the fast during a public mass. Chavez had lost about 35 pounds and was too weak to speak, so others read his message urging courage through nonviolent sacrifice. Kennedy's presence drew national attention to the farm workers’ cause and symbolized political support at the highest level for their struggle.

=== Impact of religion ===
When planning the strike, farmworkers knew that they needed to have a written plan and reason for the cause that they were fighting for, which is how the NFWA came up with The Plan of Delano (El Plan de Delano). The document stated that they were, "seeking justice in farm labor with those reforms that they believed necessary for their well-being as workers in the United States." To the NFWA, they weren't just marching, but conducting a pilgrimage, a Christian act of penance to exemplify the lengths they would go and the suffering they would endure to get the justice they deserved.

The farmers related a lot of their actions back to their religion. For example, they began their march during Lent, to further their message of penance and sacrifice, and planned to end the march on Easter Sunday, which acted as a metaphor for their redemption and a new life if they are able to attain their wants as presented in The Plan of Delano.

As they marched, they also carried banners with the image of Our Lady Guadalupe, a very important religious figure in Mexican and other Latin cultures. Cesar Chavez and his supporters believed that if they walked with her and carried her emblem with them, she would help to support and protect them from the oppression they were facing.

== Additional effects beyond the strike ==
The Delano Grape Strike was not only fought in the fields of California but was rather a widespread strike. Matt Garcia goes in to further detail in the article, "A Moveable Feast: The UFW Grape Boycott and Farm Worker Justice" where it is discussed how by motivating consumers to stop buying table grapes, the UFW put a lot of economic worry for the grape growers. It was a boycott beyond just the farmers, it turned into the consumers boycott too.

The strike forced grape growers to sign contracts with the UFW that demanded better wages, medical benefits, and also helped pass the California Agricultural Labor Relations Act (ALRA) in 1975. The ALRA allowed for farmworkers to legally form organized unions, the right to vote in secret-ballot elections, and bargain collectively.Through solidarity, by the 1970s, farmers were able to achieve the justice they deserved. The strike brought everyone together and essentially was a big battle for labor rights against unfair treatment.

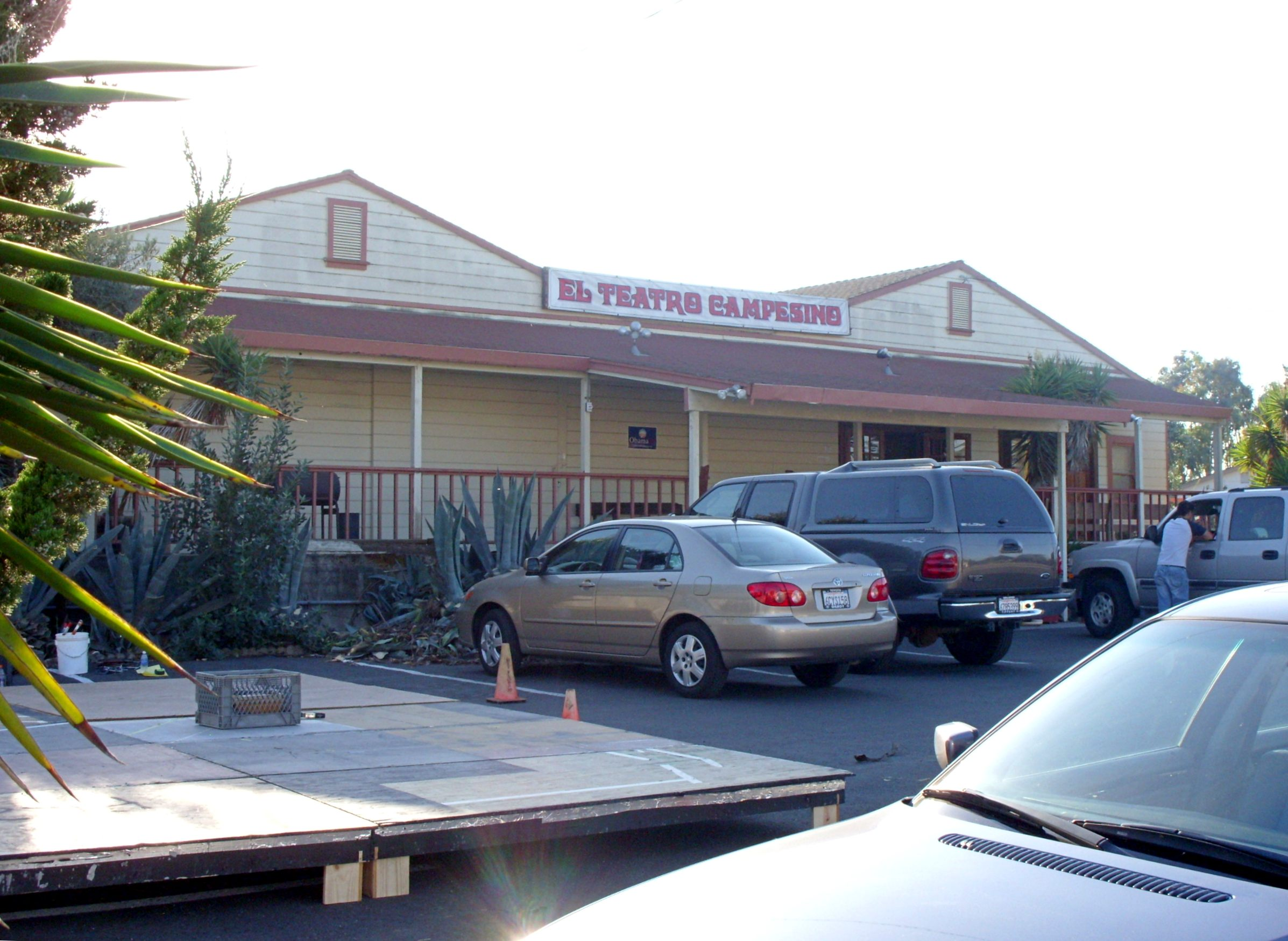
El Teatro Campensino

== Suppression attempts ==
Even though the strikers remained peaceful and non-violent during their strike, grape growers on the other hand did not fully adhere to the peace. Grape growers took measures to try and stop the movement. Growers would use pesticide and spray picketers with harmful chemicals, which would even temporarily blind them. They would also use tactics like cutting off water supplies needed by farmworkers. Grape Growers would push, shove, and even try to run over the picketers to try and stop them from picketing. Even though they were facing violent attacks, picketers remained nonviolent and continued their peaceful protesting. This allowed them to gain even more attention for their determination and will.

=== Filipino farmworkers during the strike ===
Many Filipino farm workers faced hardships during their time in agriculture. They faced racism and discrimination within the workforce, which led to the group having a strong sense of solidarity within the community. Filipino farm workers banded together to fight their unfair working conditions before the Delano Grape Strike, with Filipino farm workers banding together during the 1934 lettuce cutters strike, for example. Impacts within these previous movements would go on to inspire Cesar Chavez in his own strike.

Itliong had convinced his fellow Filipino farm workers to ask their employers for better wages. They wanted to increase their earnings from $1.20 to $1.40, but when the employers refused, Itliong called for action. AWOC members voted in favor of having a strike. On September 8, 1965, Filipino farm workers of the AWOC stopped working in the fields of Delano, California, in protest of better working conditions and wages. Larry Itliong and Ben Gines would go on to lead the strike. During this time, AWOC members were often met with violence from farm growers. Despite many barriers and discouragement from growers, Filipino farmworkers did not give up and kept the movement strong until they could strengthen it when they aligned with Cesar Chavez.

Itliong made the decision to align with Cesar Chavez as he believed the strike would be stronger if Filipino and Mexican farmworkers united. This was due to farmers hiring Mexican workers to cross the picket lines, which would undermine the strength of the strike. Itliong viewed the alliance with Cesar Chavez as important as there was no unity between the Mexican and Filipino farm workers, creating great conflict between the two.

During the strike, Filipino farm workers worked to mobilize and keep the strike going, often working with religious groups and civil rights organizations. This was also done to keep morale up during this time, as they still faced backlash from growers. For example, Filipino farm workers would face violence from vigilante gangs who would burn down labor camps in order to drive Filipino farm workers out to try and break the strike. Regardless of the violence and backlash they faced, they remained strong and united, continuing to peacefully protest.

Another aspect of the strike that was important to Filipino farmworkers was building a community. They often used Filipino community halls to meet and organize for the workers on strike. Filipino farmworkers were able to support one another during the strike in these halls, creating unity and solidarity, which was key to keeping the integrity of the movement strong.

The strike ended in 1970 with bargaining agreements with several grape growers, resulting in the improvement of the lives and working conditions of over 10,000 workers due to the contribution of Filipino farm workers' participation and involvement.

=== Religious publications during the strike ===
Both sides of the dispute were mostly Catholic. The Catholic church was somewhat torn on which side to support, with younger clergy spread across the country tending to support the strike, while the local church officials were generally either apathetic or opposed to it. This was in part due to the church's fear of supporting socialism and communism, which were often associated with unionization, during the Red Scare. Cesar Chávez was labeled a communist by Daniel Lyons, who wrote for the conservative Catholic publication Twin Circle.

The church's hesitance to support the workers also had to do with its desire to avoid coming into conflict with Catholic growers, who it received financial support from. Despite the shared religion of the farm workers and church leaders, the Mexican and Filipino workers came from different cultural traditions than the clergy, and often spoke Spanish instead of English. This created a communication barrier. Many Catholics also viewed the issue as purely political and believed the church should remain neutral.

Nevertheless, Catholic publications typically saw Caesar Chávez as a man of faith and a champion of a worthy cause. Liberal-oriented publications Commonweal and America published articles criticizing the local clergy, who they viewed as distant, and pushed the church to become more involved. The leftist publication the Catholic Worker actively supported the farm workers, encouraging boycotting and bringing to light harm caused to workers by pesticides. The Catholic church became more involved as the strike progressed, and formed an ad hoc committee in 1969 to mediate the conflict.

=== Geography ===
Page from EL Malcriado, showing the march path by striking farmworkers

The grape strike officially began in Delano in September 1965. In December, union representatives traveled from California to New York, Washington, D.C., Pittsburgh, Detroit, and other large cities to encourage a boycott of grapes grown at ranches without UFW contracts.

In the summer of 1966, unions and religious groups from Seattle and Portland endorsed the boycott. Supporters formed a boycott committee in Vancouver, prompting an outpouring of support from Canadians that would continue throughout the following years.

In 1967, UFW supporters in Oregon began picketing stores in Eugene, Salem, and Portland. After melon workers went on strike in Texas, growers held the first union representation elections in the region, and the UFW became the first union to ever sign a contract with a grower in Texas.

National support for the UFW continued to grow in 1968, and hundreds of UFW members and supporters were arrested. Picketing continued throughout the country, including in Massachusetts, New Jersey, Ohio, Oklahoma, and Florida. The mayors of New York, Baltimore, Philadelphia, Buffalo, Detroit, and other cities pledged their support, and many of them altered their cities’ grape purchases to support the boycott.

In 1969, support for farm workers increased throughout North America. The grape boycott spread into the South as civil rights groups pressured grocery stores in Atlanta, Miami, New Orleans, Nashville, and Louisville to remove non-union grapes. Student groups in New York protested the Department of Defense and accused them of deliberately purchasing boycotted grapes. On May 10, UFW supporters picketed Safeway stores throughout the U.S. and Canada in celebration of International Grape Boycott Day. Cesar Chavez also went on a speaking tour along the East Coast to ask for support from labor groups, religious groups, and universities.

== Impact ==
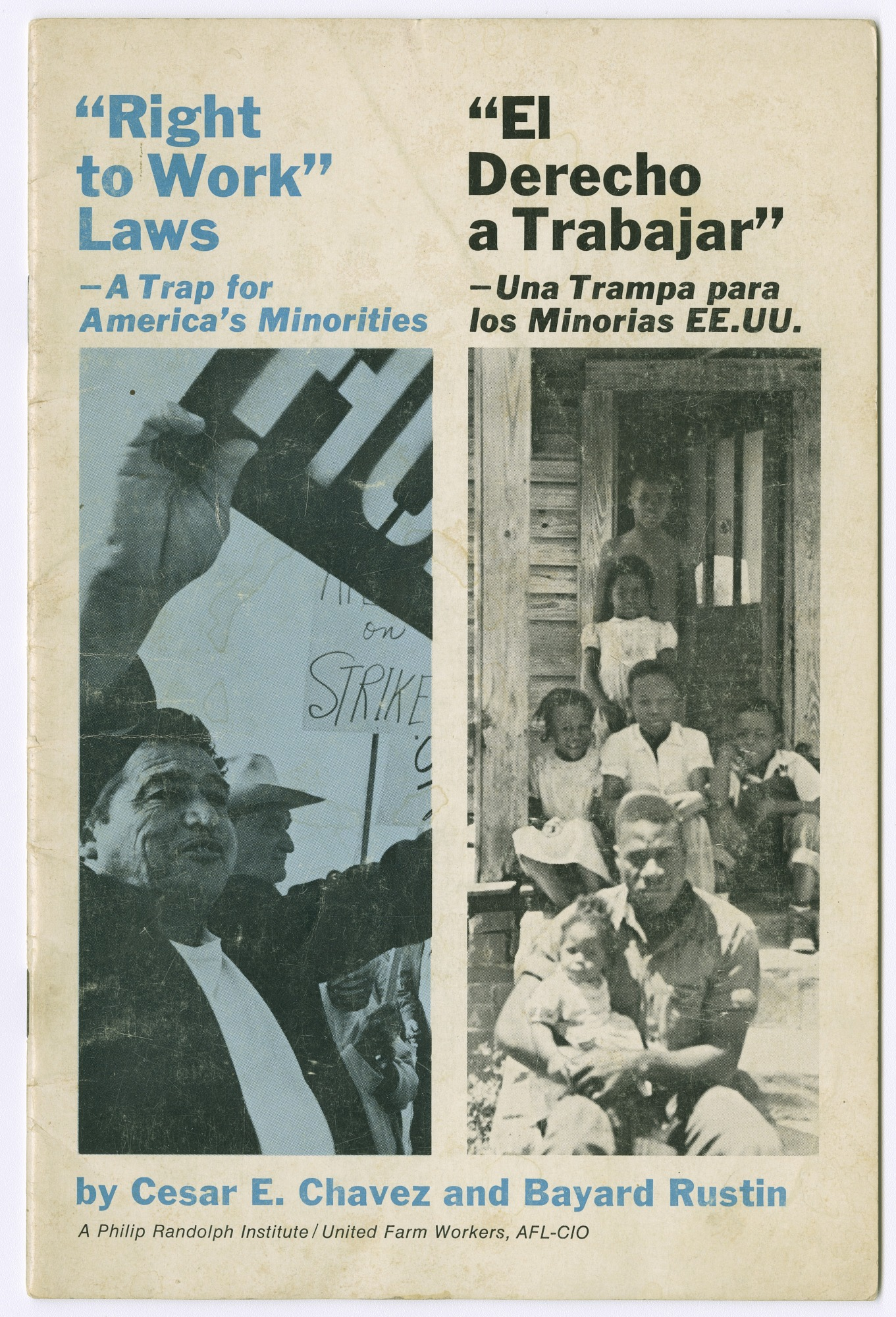
A two-color brochure highlighting the solidarity between Black and Latino communities during the Delano Grape Strike.

The Delano strike and the events that transpired throughout 1960 to 1975 resulted in a victory for the UFW and farm workers. By 1968, the UFW had signed contracts with 10 different table grape growers, which included Schenley Industries and DiGiorgio Corporation, but strikes and boycotts did not cease until 1970, when 26 table grape growers signed contracts with the UFW. Contracts between the UFW and grape growers were the first of their kind in agricultural history, and alongside the immediate effects of these initial contracts such as the increase in wages and improved working conditions, some contracts included provisions regarding unemployment insurance, paid vacation days, and the creation of a special benefits fund.

After the end of the grape strike in 1970, a strike against lettuce growers began. This led to conflict with the Teamsters union, in the Salinas Valley.

In June 1975, California passed a law allowing for secret ballot union representation elections for farm workers. By mid-September, the UFW won the right to represent 4,500 workers at 24 farms, while the Teamsters won the right to represent 4,000 workers at 14 farms. The UFW won the majority of the elections in which it participated.

The Teamsters signed an agreement with the UFW in 1977, promising to end its efforts to represent farm workers. The boycott of grapes, lettuce, and Gallo Winery products officially ended in 1978.

Despite the successes achieved by the UFW, there were also negative outcomes that farm workers experienced. The most significant of these was the deteriorated relationship between the Filipino and Mexican farm workers. In the initial contracts, the UFW implemented the hiring hall system. The hiring hall system was established with the intent of ending farm workers' migration cycle, which the UFW believed would make for more organized and efficient harvesting. However, the hiring hall system disadvantaged many of the Filipino who were accustomed to migrating with the harvesting season.

The hiring hall system replaced the old system of foremen which Filipino workers relied on for job stability and forced workers to line up at the union and compete with younger Hispanic farmworkers. Furthermore, the hiring hall system favored settled workers, who in the union were primarily Hispanic workers. As a result of this, many Filipino leaders and union members such as Larry Itliong left the union, as they felt overlooked and their needs, especially of the older Filipino workers, unprioritized.

The consequence of the conflicting visions between Filipino and Mexican farmworkers led another Filipino leader, Philip Vera Cruz to decide to leave the union following Cesar Chavez's meeting with Filipino President Ferdinand Marcos where Chavez received recognition in Marcos’ regime. This essentially meant that Filipino leadership and workers were on their own trying to represent themselves to achieve their needs.

Tensions in the UFW between Filipino and Mexican farmworkers lead The Teamsters to take advantage of the internal chaos within the UFW, to become the victors of promoting The Teamsters’ traditional labor system of benefiting the farmworkers, getting the attention of some of the UFW's Filipino workers to switch to The Teamsters, escaping from the UFW's alternative labor system that essentially promoted racial discrimination against Filipinos. Due to the changes in immigration policies and new economic opportunities, Filipino involvement in farm labor began to decline.

Following the strike, the actions of Cesar Chavez were highlighted and remembered. The 2014 film Cesar Chavez highlights his role in the labor movement. Less remembered are the many others who collaborated with him to organize strikes and fight for farmer rights. Particularly forgotten were the efforts of Filipino Americans in the strike. For example, in the 2014 film, the Filipinos role was largely absent, except for one speaking line and a few group shots.

The impact of the strike is still felt today in California, such as Filipino Americans holding office in state legislatures and executive positions in government and laws recognizing farm worker's rights to form unions. However, after the strikes in the 1960s and 70s, work on farms went back to how it was prior to all the work done by the unions: harsh working conditions and low wages. With the strikes led by Cesar Chavez and Larry Itliong, farm workers are able to come together and strike for their rights on the farm that was not seen before the strikes that occurred in the 1960s.

== See also ==
- El Malcriado
