= Larry Itliong =

Filipino-American union organizer (1913–1977)

- Born: Modesto Dulay Itliong; October 25, 1913; San Nicolas, Pangasinan, Philippine Islands
- Died: February 8, 1977 (aged 63) (Note: Sources disagree as to whether Itliong died on February 8 or 10, 1977; February 8 is the date that was inscribed on his gravestone.); Delano, California, U.S.
- Other name: Seven Fingers
- Occupations: Labor organizer; farmworker

Modesto "Larry" Dulay Itliong (October 25, 1913 – February 8, 1977), also known as "Seven Fingers", was a Filipino-American union organizer. He organized West Coast agricultural workers starting in the 1930s, and rose to national prominence in 1965, when he, Philip Vera Cruz, Benjamin Gines and Pete Velasco walked off the farms of area table-grape growers, demanding wages equal to the federal minimum wage, in what became known as the Delano grape strike. He has been described as "one of the fathers of the West Coast labor movement".

== Biography ==
Itliong was born in San Nicolas, Pangasinan, Philippines (then a territory of the United States). One of six children of Artemio and Francesca Itliong, he only had a sixth-grade education. He immigrated to the United States in 1929 at age 15 and joined his first strike in 1930. Itliong was an excellent card player and avid cigar smoker, who spoke multiple Filipino languages, Spanish, Cantonese, and Japanese, and taught himself about law. Itliong married six times, had seven children, and raised his family in the Delano area and in the Little Manila community in Stockton, California.

As a farmworker, Itliong worked in Alaska, where he organized cannery and agricultural unions, Washington, and up and down California; he also worked in Montana and South Dakota. While living in Alaska, he helped found the Alaska Cannery Workers Union (which later became Local 7 of the United Cannery and Packing and Allied Workers Union, then Local 7 of the International Longshoreman's and Warehouse Workers Union). He lost three fingers in an accident in an Alaskan cannery, which earned him the nickname "Seven Fingers".

Some of the labor organizers whom Itliong met in his early days had ties to the Communist Party. Filipinos in California led the way in unionization efforts among farmworkers in the 1930s and 40s. During World War II, Itliong served on a U.S. Army transport ship as a messman. After the war, he settled in the city of Stockton in California's Central Valley. In 1948, Itliong (along with Rudy Delvo, Chris Mensalvas, Philip Vera Cruz, and Ernesto Mangaoang) became involved in the 1948 asparagus strike, which was the first major agriculture strike after World War II. Itliong served as the first shop steward of International Longshore and Warehouse Union Local 37, in Seattle, and was elected its vice-president in 1953. He served as secretary of the Filipino Community of Stockton from 1954 to 1956. In 1956, Itliong founded the Filipino Farm Labor Union in Stockton. In 1957, he was elected president of the Filipino Voters League in Stockton. By 1965, Itliong was leading the AFL-CIO union Agricultural Workers Organizing Committee; the majority of the members of the committee were Filipinos who had arrived in the United States in the 1930s.

A vote was held on May 3, 1965, in which the committee voted to strike against Coachella Valley grape growers in Southern California. Although the strikers weren't able to negotiate a contract with the growers, they did succeed in winning higher wages. Following this success, on September 8, 1965, the Agriculture Workers Organizing Committee voted to strike against grape growers in Delano, California, where the grape season starts in September. This strike became the first time Mexican workers, due to the decision of Cesar Chavez, did not break a strike of Filipinos; later, on September 16, 1965, Chavez's National Farm Workers Association joined the Agricultural Workers Organizing Committee on the picket lines. These strikes occurred around the same time as when younger Filipino Americans began a period of political self-reflection and awakening.

The Agricultural Workers Organizing Committee and National Farm Workers Association merged to form the United Farm Workers; Itliong was skeptical of the merger, as he believed that Mexicans would become dominant over the Filipinos when the organizations merged, and that improving work conditions would come at the expense of Filipino farmworkers, but Itliong kept those feelings to himself at the time. In 1966, the California Rural Legal Assistance was founded as part of President Lyndon B. Johnson's War on Poverty, with Cesar Chavez, Dolores Huerta, and Itliong sitting on the founding board. Itliong served as assistant director of the United Farm Workers under Cesar Chavez, and in 1970 he was appointed the United Farm Workers' national boycott coordinator. In 1971, Itliong resigned from the United Farm Workers because of disagreements about the governance of the union; another reason for resigning from the United Farm Workers was that Itliong felt that the union was not willing to support aging Filipinos. Alex Fabros, a doctoral candidate at University of California, Santa Barbara, called the merger "devastating for the Filipinos who participated in the UFW".

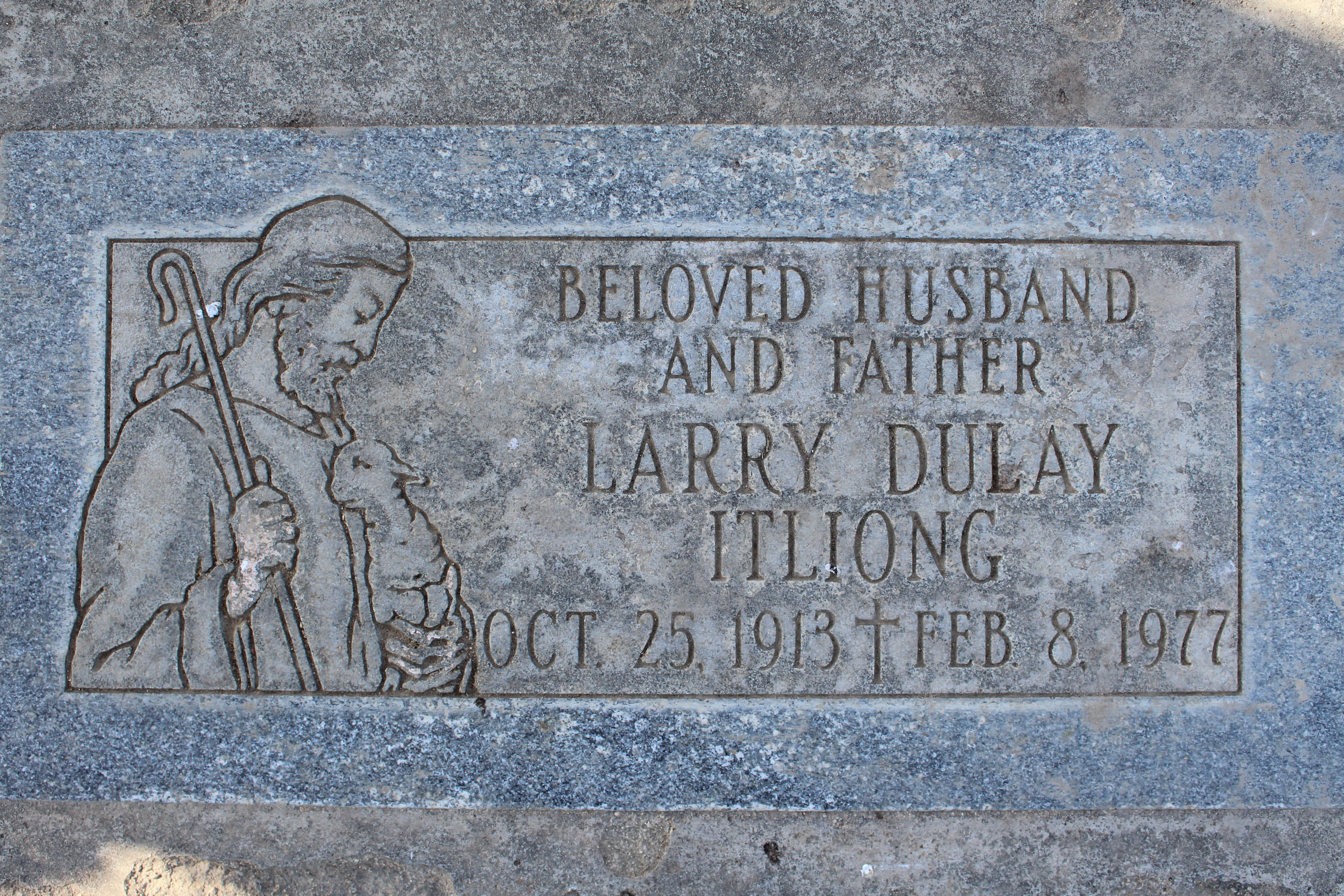
Itliong's gravestone in Delano's North Kern Cemetery

After leaving the United Farm Workers, Itliong assisted retired Filipino farmworkers in Delano and was a delegate at the 1972 Democratic National Convention. Together with Vera Cruz, Itliong worked towards building a retirement facility for UFW workers, known as Agbayani Village. Although no longer in the United Farm Workers, Itliong continued to support others in the organized labor movement, such as helping others plan a strike against Safeway supermarkets in 1974. Itliong also served as president of the Filipino American Political Association, a bipartisan lobbying organization. He died in Delano in February 1977, aged 63, from Lou Gehrig's disease.

== Legacy ==
Most history books mention Chavez and the United Farm Workers, but do not include a mention of Itliong or other Filipinos. Speaking about Chavez and his father, Johnny Itliong said, "Larry was militant. Cesar was non-violent. Cesar had handlers. Cesar had lawyers. Cesar was a dictator."

The first public art memorial honoring Filipino American farmworkers was unveiled on June 24, 1995, in Historic Filipinotown, Los Angeles, with Larry Itliong and Philip Vera Cruz as its most prominent historical figures. Itliong was posthumously honored in 2010 by inclusion in a mural at California State University, Dominguez Hills.

In 2011, Los Angeles County recognized Itliong with Larry Itliong Day on October 25; this follows the City of Carson, which became the first city in the United States to recognize Larry Itliong Day in the United States in 2010. In 2015 Governor Jerry Brown signed a bill to establish Larry Itliong Day in California. It was proclaimed in 2019 by Governor Gavin Newsom.

In mid-April 2013, the New Haven Unified School District renamed Alvarado Middle School as the Itliong-Vera Cruz Middle School in honor of Vera Cruz and Larry Itliong; this school is the first school in the United States to be named for Filipino Americans. There was a vocal opposition to the name change, some of whom waved Mexican flags, who said that the name changing disrupts the neighborhood's tradition. The middle school was originally named for Juan Bautista Alvarado, and the name change did not take effect until 2015. This occurred after a 13-year effort to rename a school for the Filipino American leaders, after several other schools had been named to reflect the city's diverse population, including Cesar Chavez Middle School, where 20% of the population is Filipino American.

In late April 2013, a Filipino business and a Filipino Community Center were targeted with graffiti vandalism; the graffiti was investigated as a hate crime.

In 2014, an overpass over the Filipino American Highway in south San Diego was designated as the "Itliong-Vera Cruz Memorial Bridge".

A documentary titled The Delano Manongs: Forgotten Heroes of the UFW was made to highlight the role of Filipinos in the farm labor movement, including Itliong; the documentary was released in 2013. Itliong was portrayed by Darion Basco in the 2014 film about Cesar Chavez; the film did not include other Filipino American farm labor leaders such as Vera Cruz.

In 2018, a children's book was published, highlighting Itliong's life and his role in the agriculture labor movement.

The Filipino Hall in Delano, California, houses a collection of memorabilia. The Larry Itliong Papers are housed at the Walter Reuther Library at Wayne State University in Detroit.

A musical based on Itliong's life, titled Larry the Musical, debuted in San Francisco in 2024, with original compositions by Bryan Pangilinan.

== See also ==
- Philip Vera Cruz
- Cesar Chavez
- Dolores Huerta
