= Philip Vera Cruz =

American labor leader (1904–1994)

- Vera Cruz in his later years
- Born: December 25, 1904; Saoang, San Juan, Ilocos Sur, Philippine Islands
- Died: June 12, 1994 (aged 89); Bakersfield, California, U.S.
- Occupations: Labor organizer, farmworker

Philip Villamin Vera Cruz (December 25, 1904 – June 12, 1994) was a Filipino American labor leader and farmworker. He helped found the Agricultural Workers Organizing Committee (AWOC), which later merged with the National Farm Workers Association (NFWA) to become the United Farm Workers (UFW) in 1966. In 1971, he was appointed as the organization’s second vice president, the highest-ranking Filipino American in the union. He wanted his work to cross both ethnic and generational lines. Thus, it included Filipino, Mexican, and Black workers, and he advocated for retirees he found were neglected in the broader movement for racial equality in America. Some of his major projects included chairing efforts to build the Paulo Agbayani Retirement Village, opened in 1974, which housed Filipino farmworkers who had aged out of the labor force and helping organize the Delano Grape Strike. In 1977, Vera Cruz resigned from the UFW. He had grown apart from the president, Cesar Chavez, due to disagreements over the Union's mission and actions.

After his departure, he continued his advocacy and mentoring until his death in Bakersfield, California.

== Early life ==
Vera Cruz was born in Saoang, San Juan, Ilocos Sur, Philippines (then a territory of the United States) on December 25, 1905 on christmas. As a small boy, he tended to water buffalo (carabaos) for his father, which he described as much easier than the work he would do in California. These early experiences exposed Vera Cruz to the physical demands and economic constraints of rural peasant farming under colonial administration. For example, small landholders often faced land tenure insecurities and limited market access. He received limited formal education while he lived in the Philippines. His family obligations often inhibited his time for schooling, but when he could, Vera Cruz attended American colonial schools, established to promote a Western-style education in the territory.

In 1926, 20-year-old Vera Cruz emigrated to the United States aboard the RMS Empress of Asia. As an early Filipino immigrant, he was a part of the manong generation, shaped by the ability to enter the United States as non-citizen U.S. nationals and, after the Tydings-McDuffie Act of 1934, as aliens with restricted immigration rights. As a result, early Filipino-American immigration saw constrained family formation and segregation in labor and housing enforced under a legal purview. Participating in immigration during this time period and feeling the effects first-hand influenced Vera Cruz’s worldview on social justice and equality.

He performed a wide variety of jobs after entering America, including working in an Alaskan cannery, a restaurant, and a box factory. He was briefly a member of the Industrial Workers of the World. For a year, beginning in 1931, Vera Cruz studied at Gonzaga University, which erected a bench in his honor in 2021. In 1942, he was drafted into the United States Army, but was later discharged due to age.

== Labor activities ==
=== Informal organization ===
Following his discharge from the U.S. Army around the end of World War II, Philip Vera Cruz settled in the San Joaquin Valley. He took up seasonal agricultural labor, working nine to ten hours per day at about seventy cents per hour. Farmworkers like Vera Cruz resided in rudimentary labor camps with meager amenities. They lacked access to healthcare despite grueling field conditions and exposure to harsh weather, dust, and early pesticides. Despite this, growers in grapes, lettuce, asparagus, and other cash crop fields refused to increase wages or entertain bargaining. As a response, Vera Cruz helped facilitate the growth of informal communication networks among Filipino farmworkers, often elderly, unmarried immigrants. They practiced damay, a system of mutual aid where contributors would pool resources for rent, medical needs, or emergencies, which bolstered community ties.

While local support was integral for further action, such as raising direct complaints to grew bosses, Vera Cruz recognized that grassroots actions were limited by ethnic isolation. By the late 1940s, Filipino labor began to phase out in favor of the importation of cheaper, Mexican workers. The Bracero Program, active from 1942 to 1964, was the codification of that agenda. Strikers and vocal workers were vulnerable to replacement. Concurrently, the mechanization of agriculture intensified growing job insecurity. All of these factors culminated in Vera Cruz's recognition for the need for wider alliances to counter the threats to his community.

=== Founding role in the Agricultural Workers Organizing Committee (AWOC) ===
Vera Cruz eventually settled in California, where he became a farmworker. He joined the AFL-CIO-affiliated union, the National Farm Labor Union, in the 1950s. His union local, based in Delano, California, had an Agricultural Workers Organizing Committee (AWOC). The prime focus of AWOC was to add members to the National Farm Labor Union. AWOC was composed primarily of Filipino American farmworker organizers, although it did hire Dolores Huerta. Huerta eventually quit the AWOC to join the National Farm Workers of America, which had a primarily Mexican American membership. The organization targeted Filipino-dominated sectors, such as asparagus and grape harvesting, as a priority group.

Labor leaders in this organization, including Philip Vera Cruz alongside Larry Itliong and Pete Velasco, advocated for the use of collective bargaining to leverage change to the benefit of workers. While AWOC created a platform for formal grievances under institutional legitimacy, it still had internal challenges because of its ethnic homogeneity that limited broader alliances without occasional factionalism.

=== The Delano grape strike ===
The National Labor Relations Act of 1935 excluded farmworkers. This meant they did not have the right of collective bargaining, which was afforded to other U.S. laborers. With this lack of protections in mind, Vera Cruz urged strikers to use non-violent protest methods, he believed violence could undermine their cause.

On September 8, 1965, members of the Agricultural Workers Organizing Committee in the Delano local voted to strike against the grape growers. Over 1500 workers rallied to protest stagnant wages. Following the strike call, the growers attempted to bring in Mexican American workers, some of whom were affiliated with the National Farm Workers of America. Cesar Chavez, Dolores Huerta, and other leaders of the National Farm Workers of America met with several National Farm Labor Union organizers, including Vera Cruz, Larry Itliong, Benjamin Gines and Pete Velasco. Together, they decided that both unions would strike against the grape growers, an action which eventually led to both unions joining to become the United Farm Workers, debuting in August 1966, and continuing the strike into 1970.

He described the start of the Delano grape strike as following:

Philip Vera Cruz, a former UFW Vice President, described the start of the great Delano grape strike.

On September 8, 1965, at the Filipino Hall at 1457 Glenwood St. in Delano, the Filipino members of AWOC held a mass meeting to discuss and decide whether to strike or to accept the reduced wages proposed by the growers. The decision was "to strike" and it became one of the most significant and famous decisions ever made in the entire history of the farmworkers struggles in California. It was like an incendiary bomb, exploding out the strike message to the workers in the vineyards, telling them to have sit-ins in the labor camps, and set up picket lines at every grower's ranch... It was this strike that eventually made the UFW, the farmworkers movement, and Cesar Chavez famous worldwide.

In the new union, Vera Cruz served as second vice president and on the managing board.

== Leaving the UFW and later life ==
Vera Cruz resigned from the UFW in 1977. Vera Cruz and Chavez had been drifting apart, and Vera Cruz felt that Chavez did not give Filipinos due credit for their role in starting the labor movement. Things culminated that year, when Chavez traveled to the Philippines to meet with Ferdinand Marcos, whom Vera Cruz saw as a brutal dictator. Vera Cruz continued to live in the San Joaquin Valley of California after his resignation, and remained active in union and social justice issues for the rest of his life. Vera Cruz received the Ninoy M. Aquino Award in 1987, traveling to the Philippines for the first time in fifty years to accept it. In 1992, the AFL-CIO's Asia Pacific American Labor Committee honored Vera Cruz at its founding convention. He died at the age of 89 in 1994, in Bakersfield, California.

== Legacy ==
In 1995, the first mural honoring Vera Cruz and other Filipino-American farm workers was completed in Los Angeles’ Historic Filipinotown.

In 2013, the New Haven Unified School District renamed Alvarado Middle School as Itliong-Vera Cruz Middle School in honor of Vera Cruz and Larry Itliong; this school is the first school in the United States to be named after Filipino Americans.

In 2014, an overpass over a segment of the California State Route 54 in South San Diego named the "Filipino-American Highway" was designated as the "Itliong-Vera Cruz Memorial Bridge".
