= Carlos Bulosan =

Filipino-American novelist (1913–1956)

- Portrait from the University of Washington Libraries, Special Collections, c. 1945
- Born: Carlos Sampayan Bulosan; November 24, 1913; Binalonan, Pangasinan, Philippine Islands
- Died: September 11, 1956 (aged 42); Seattle, Washington, U.S
- Occupations: Novelist; essayist; labor union organizer

Carlos Sampayan Bulosan (November 24, 1913 – September 11, 1956) was a Filipino-American novelist and poet who immigrated to the United States on July 22, 1930. He never returned to the Philippines and he spent most of his life in the United States. His best-known work today is the semi-autobiographical America Is in the Heart, but he first gained fame for his 1943 essay on The Freedom from Want.

== Early life and immigration ==
Bulosan was born to Ilocano parents in the Philippines in Binalonan, Pangasinan. There is considerable debate around his actual birth date, as he himself used several dates. 1911 is generally considered to be the most reliable answer, based on his baptismal records, but according to the Lorenzo Duyanen Sampayan, his childhood playmate and nephew, Bulosan was born on November 2, 1913. Most of his youth was spent in the countryside as a farmer. It is during his youth that he and his family were economically impoverished by the rich and political elite, which would become one of the main themes of his writing. His home town is also the starting point of his semi-autobiographical novel, America is in the Heart.

Following the pattern of many Filipinos during the American colonial period, he left for America on July 22, 1930, at age 17, in the hope of finding salvation from the economic depression of his home. He never again saw his Philippine homeland. Upon arriving in Seattle, he was met with racism and was forced to work low paying jobs. He worked as a farmworker, harvesting grapes and asparagus, while also working other forms of hard labor in the fields of California. He also worked as a dishwasher with his brother Lorenzo in the famous Madonna Inn in San Luis Obispo which opened in 1958 or almost three years after Bulosan had died.

In 1936, Bulosan suffered from tuberculosis and was taken to the Los Angeles County Hospital. There, he underwent three operations and stayed two years, mostly in the convalescent ward. During his long stay in the hospital, Bulosan spent his time constantly reading and writing.

== Labor movement work ==
Bulosan contributed to the labor movement and progressive causes through his editorial and literary work. He was associated with the United Cannery, Agricultural, Packing, and Allied Workers of America (UCAPAWA) and the International Longshore and Warehouse Union (ILWU) a predominantly Filipino American cannery trade union based in Seattle. In 1934 he helped edit The New Tide, a short-lived Filipino workers’ literary magazine that connected him with other left-leaning writers, including Richard Wright and Sanora Babb. Through The New Tide, Bulosan promoted themes of social justice, anti-colonial struggle, and solidarity among working-class communities. There he was hired to edit the 1952 Yearbook for International Longshore and Warehouse Union Local 37.

During the 1940s and 1950s, Bulosan expanded his activism as a journalist for the ILWU. His articles and reports in union publications addressed Filipino migrant labor conditions and supported multiracial worker solidarity along the Pacific Coast. His visibility as a union writer led to FBI surveillance during the early Cold War years, when he was considered a “dangerous subversive.” Despite these pressures, Bulosan continued to use newsletters, magazines, and union yearbooks to articulate the struggles and aspirations of Filipino and other marginalized workers in the United States.

== Writing ==
There is some controversy surrounding the accuracy of events recorded within America Is in the Heart. He is celebrated for giving a post-colonial, Asian immigrant perspective to the labor movement in America and for telling the experience of Filipinos working in the U.S. during the 1930s and '40s. In the 1970s, with a resurgence in Asian/Pacific Islander American activism, his unpublished writings were discovered in a library in the University of Washington leading to posthumous releases of several unfinished works and anthologies of his poetry.

His other novels include The Laughter of My Father, which were originally published as short sketches, and the posthumously published The Cry and the Dedication which detailed the Hukbalahap Rebellion in the Philippines.

One of his most famous essays, published in March 1943, was chosen by The Saturday Evening Post to accompany its publication of the Norman Rockwell painting Freedom from Want, part of a series based on Franklin D. Roosevelt's "Four Freedoms" speech. Maxim Lieber was his literary agent in 1944.

== Death and legacy ==
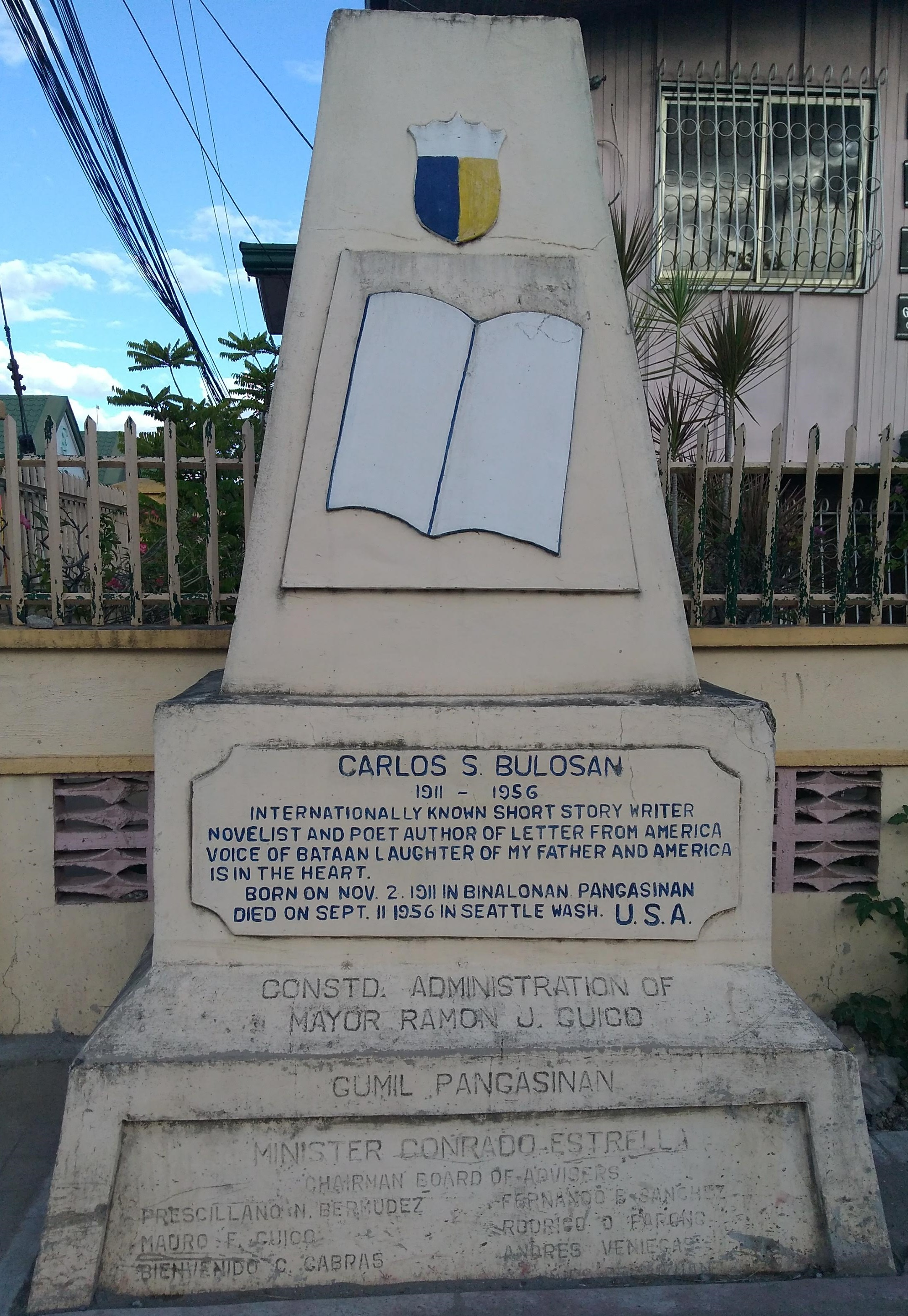
Historical marker in honor of Bulosan in Binalonan, Pangasinan

As a labor organizer and socialist writer, he was blacklisted during the Second Red Scare of the 1950s. Denied a means to provide for himself, his later years were of illness, hardship, and alcoholism. He died in Seattle suffering from malnutrition and an advanced stage of bronchopneumonia. He is buried at Mount Pleasant Cemetery on Queen Anne Hill in Seattle.

Upon his death, union leader Chris Mensalvas, wrote the following obituary: "Carlos Bulosan, 30 years old (sic), died 11 September 1956, Seattle. Birthplace: Philippines, Address: Unknown; Occupation: Writer; Hobby: Famous for his jungle salad served during Foreign-Born Committee dinners. Estate: One typewriter, a twenty-year old suit, unfinished manuscripts, worn out sock; Finances: Zero. Beneficiary: His people."

His works did not immediately garner widespread appreciation. For two decades after his death, his work was largely forgotten, until a group of young Asian Americans rediscovered his works and led to the republication of America is in the Heart in 1973.

Bulosan's works and legacy is heralded in a permanent exhibition, "The Carlos Bulosan Memorial Exhibit," at the Eastern Hotel in Seattle's International District. Its centerpiece mural is titled "Secrets of History" and was created by Eliseo Art Silva.

In 2018, the Bulosan Center for Filipino Studies Initiative was established at the University of California, Davis to carry on his legacy of activism through research and advocacy of the Filipino and Filipino-American community. The initiative backs the creation of a physical Bulosan Center for Filipino Studies to support research, education and advocacy. The center aims to continue Bulosan's legacy by uplifting the voices of the most marginalized in the Filipino community in the United States and the diaspora through community-engaged research and broadly disseminating knowledge about Filipinos for the purpose of advancing their rights and welfare.

== Works ==
- Letter from America (The Press of James A. Decker, 1942)
- America Is in the Heart (1946) ISBN 02-959-9353-7
- The Laughter of My Father (1944) ISBN 12-582-4915-4
- The Cry and the Dedication (1995)
- My Father's Tragedy
- The Romance of Magno Rubio
- If You Want To Know What We Are
- My Father goes to Court

== Sources ==
- "Bulosan's Laughter: The Making of Carlos Bulosan" *Bulosan Exhibit
- Hounded to Death: the FBI File of Filipino Author Carlos Bulosan
- Carlos Bulosan Theatre
- "Filipino American Hip-Hop: Renewing the Spirit of Carlos Bulosan"
- See 2014 Edition (Univ. of Washington Press) of his "America Is In the Heart" as its two Introductions,'For Further Reading' and 'Works Cited' are quite extensive.
