= History of Filipino Americans =

The history of Filipino Americans begins in the 16th century when Filipinos first arrived in what is now the United States, then part of New Spain. Until the 19th century, the Philippines continued to be geographically isolated from the rest of New Spain in the Americas but maintained regular communication across the Pacific Ocean via the Manila galleon. Filipino seamen in the Americas settled in Louisiana, and Alta California, beginning in the 18th century. By the 19th century, Filipinos were living in the United States, fighting in the Battle of New Orleans and the American Civil War, with the first Filipino becoming a naturalized citizen of the United States before its end. In the final years of the 19th century, the United States went to war with Spain, ultimately annexing the Philippine Islands from Spain. Due to this, the history of the Philippines merged with that of the United States, beginning with the three-year-long Philippine–American War (1899–1902), which resulted in the defeat of the First Philippine Republic, and the attempted Americanization of the Philippines.

Mass migration of Filipinos to the United States began in the early 20th century due to Filipinos being U.S. nationals. These included Filipinos who enlisted as sailors of the United States Navy, pensionados, and laborers. During the Great Depression, Filipino Americans became targets of race-based violence, including race riots such as the one in Watsonville. The Philippine Independence Act was passed in 1934, redefining Filipinos as aliens for immigration; this encouraged Filipinos to return to the Philippines and established the Commonwealth of the Philippines. During World War II, the Philippines were occupied leading to resistance, the formation of segregated Filipino regiments, and the liberation of the islands.

After World War II, the Philippines gained independence in 1946. Benefits for most Filipino veterans were rescinded with the Rescission Act of 1946. Filipinos, primarily war brides, immigrated to the United States; further immigration was set to 100 persons a year due to the Luce–Celler Act of 1946, this though did not limit the number of Filipinos able to enlist into the United States Navy. In 1965, Filipino agricultural laborers, including Larry Itliong and Philip Vera Cruz, began the Delano grape strike. That same year the 100-person per year quota of Filipino immigrants was lifted, which began the current immigration wave; many of these immigrants were nurses. Filipino Americans began to become better integrated into American society, achieving many firsts. In 1992, the enlistment of Filipinos in the Philippines into the United States ended. By the early 21st century, Filipino American History Month was recognized.

== Immigration history ==
Migration patterns of Filipinos to the U.S. have been recognized as occurring in four significant waves. The first was connected to the period when the Philippines was part of New Spain and later the Spanish East Indies; Filipinos, via the Manila galleons, would migrate to North America. The first permanent settlement of Filipinos in the U.S. is in Louisiana specifically the independent community of Saint Malo. During the California Gold Rush, about a hundred filipinos were present in Mariposa County. In the late 19th century, the author Ramon Reyes Lala became the first Filipino to naturalize and become an American citizen, settling in La Jolla The 1910 United States census recorded only 406 people of Filipino descent in the mainland U.S., including 109 in Louisiana and 17 in Washington state.

The second wave was when the Philippines was a territory of the United States; as U.S. nationals, Filipinos were unrestricted from immigrating to the U.S. by the Immigration Act of 1917 which restricted other Asians. This wave of immigration has been referred to as the manong generation. Filipinos of this wave came for different reasons, but the majority were laborers, predominantly Ilocano and Visayans. This wave of immigration was distinct from other Asian Americans, due to American influences, and education, in the Philippines; therefore they did not see themselves as aliens when they immigrated to the United States. By 1920, the Filipino population in the mainland U.S. rose from nearly 400 to over 5,600. Then in 1930, the Filipino American population exceeded 45,000, including over 30,000 in California and 3,400 in Washington. During the early 20th century, anti-miscegenation laws began to impact Filipino Americans attempting to marry non-Filipinos, with some able to legalize their unions, and others not; in 1933 California amended its laws to specify that Filipinos could not marry Whites.

During the Great Depression, Filipino Americans were also affected, losing jobs, and being the target of race-based violence. This wave of immigration ended due to the Philippine Independence Act in 1934, which restricted immigration to 50 persons a year. The Filipino Repatriation Act of 1935 further aimed to reduce the number of Filipinos living in the United States by giving them free passage back to the Philippines, but it was viewed as largely unsuccessful, with only 1,900 out of over 45,000 Filipinos registered in the Census taking up the offer.

Beginning in 1901, Filipinos were allowed to enlist in the U.S. Navy. While serving, Filipino sailors would bring over their spouse from the Philippines, or marry a spouse in the U.S., parenting and raising children who would be part of a distinct Navy-related Filipino American immigrant community. Before the end of World War I, Filipino sailors were allowed to serve in several ratings; however, due to a rule change during the interwar period, Filipino sailors were restricted to officers' stewards and mess attendants. Filipinos who immigrated to the United States, due to their military service, were exempt from quota restrictions placed on Filipino immigration at the time. This ended in 1946, following the independence of the Philippines from the U.S., but resumed in 1947 due to language inserted into the Military Base Agreement between the U.S. and the Republic of the Philippines. In 1973, Admiral Elmo Zumwalt removed the restrictions on Filipino sailors, allowing them to enter any rate they qualified for; by 1976 there were about 17,000 Filipinos serving in the U.S. Navy. Navy-based immigration of Philippine citizens stopped with the expiration of the Military Bases Agreement in 1992.

The third wave of immigration followed the events of World War II. During World War II, over 250,000 Filipinos served with the United States military. Filipinos who had served in World War II were given the option of becoming U.S. citizens, and many took the opportunity, over 10,000 according to Barkan. Filipina war brides were allowed to immigrate to the U.S. due to the War Brides Act and Alien Fiancées and Fiancés Act, with approximately 16,000 Filipinas entering the U.S. in the years following the war. This immigration was not limited to Filipinas and children; between 1946 and 1950, one Filipino groom was granted immigration under the War Brides Act. A source of immigration was opened up with the Luce–Celler Act, that gave the Philippines a quota of 100 persons a year; yet records show that 32,201 Filipinos immigrated between 1953 and 1965. Miscegenation laws in the United States prevented Filipinos marrying American women, despite this many Filipino males who served in the United States military cohabited and had children with white women. The laws prevented interracial marriage with Filipinos continued until 1948 in California; this extended nationally in 1967 when anti-miscegenation laws were struck down by the U.S. Supreme Court by Loving v. Virginia. This wave ended in 1965.

The fourth and present wave of immigration began in 1965 with the passing of the Immigration and Nationality Act of 1965. It ended national quotas, and provided an unlimited number of visas for family reunification. By the 1970s and 1980s, the immigration of Filipina wives of service members reached annual rates of five to eight thousand. The Philippines became the largest source of legal immigration to the U.S. from Asia. Many Filipinas of this new wave of migration have migrated here as professionals due to a shortage in qualified nurses; from 1966 until 1991, at least 35,000 Filipino nurses immigrated to the U.S. As of 2005, 55% of foreign-trained registered nurses taking the qualifying exam administered by the Commission on Graduates of Foreign Nursing Schools (CGFNS) were educated in the Philippines. Although Filipinos made up 24 percent of foreign physicians entering the U.S. in 1970, Filipino physicians experienced widespread underemployment in the 1970s due to the requirement of passing the Educational Commission for Foreign Medical Graduates (ECFMG) exam to practice in the U.S. Some Filipino immigrants to the United States experience a culture shock once arriving, however many Filipinos who are already educated in English in the Philippines can efficiently communicate once in the United States.

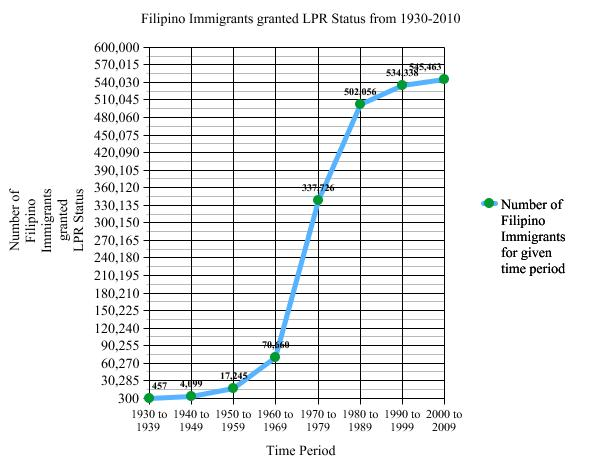
This is a graph of the history of Filipino immigration to the U.S. The source for this data is based on the U.S. Department of Homeland Security 2016 Yearbook Statistics.

In 2016, 50,609 Filipinos obtained their lawful permanent residency, according to the U.S. Department of Homeland Security. Of those Filipinos receiving their lawful permanent residency status in 2016, 66% were new arrivals, while 34% were immigrants who adjusted their status within the U.S. In 2016, data collected from the U.S. Department of Homeland Security found that the categories of admission for Filipino immigrants were composed mainly of immediate relatives, that is 57% of admissions. This makes the admission of immediate relatives for Filipinos higher than the overall average lawful permanent resident immigrants, which is composed of only 47.9%. Following immediate relative admission, family sponsored and employment-based admission make up the next highest means of entry for Philippine immigration, with 28% and 14% respectively. Like immediate relative admission, both of these categories are higher than that of the overall U.S. lawful permanent resident immigrants. Diversity, refugees and asylum, and other categories of admission make up less than one percent of Filipino immigrants granted lawful permanent resident status in 2016.

== Timeline ==
- 1573–1811, Between roughly 1556 and 1813, Spain engaged in the galleon trade between Manila and Acapulco. The galleons were built in the shipyards of Cavite, outside Manila, by Filipino craftsmen. The trade was funded by Chinese traders, manned by Filipino sailors and "supervised" by Mexico City officials. During this time, Spain recruited Mexicans to serve as soldiers in Manila. Likewise, they drafted Filipinos to serve as soldiers in Mexico. Once drafted and posted to the Americas, Filipino soldiers were frequently not returned home.
- 1587, First Filipinos ("Luzonians") to set foot in North America arrive in Morro Bay (San Luis Obispo), California on board the galleon ship Nuestra Senora de Esperanza under the command of Spanish Captain Pedro de Unamuno; Filipinos become the first Asians in California.
- 1595, Filipino were among the crew aboard the San Augustine when it wrecked near Point Reyes, California.
- 1763, First permanent Filipino settlements established in North America near Barataria Bay in southern Louisiana.
- 1769, Filipino sailors aboard the San Carlos die aboard ship in San Diego Bay during the Portolá expedition, and are buried ashore.
- 1779, A Filipino mariner, of the San Jose received their confirmation at Mission San Carlos Borromeo de Carmelo; the confirmation was conducted by Fr. Junípero Serra.
- 1781, Antonio Miranda Rodriguez was chosen as a member of the first group of settlers to establish the City of Los Angeles, California. He and his daughter fell sick with smallpox while en route, and remained in Baja California for an extended period to recuperate. When they finally arrived in Alta California, it was realised that Miranda Rodriguez was a skilled gunsmith and he was reassigned in 1782 to the Presidio of Santa Barbara as an armorer. When he died, he was buried at the presidio's chapel.
- 1796, The first American trading ship reaches Manila, the Astrea, under the command of Captain Henry Prince.
- 1814, During the War of 1812, Filipinos residing in Louisiana, referred to as "Manilamen" residing near the city of New Orleans, including the Manila Village, were among the "Baratarians", a group of men who fought with Jean Lafitte and Andrew Jackson in the Battle of New Orleans during the War of 1812. The battle was fought after the Treaty of Ghent was signed.
- 1861–1865, Approximately 100 Filipinos and Chinese enlist during the American Civil War into the Union Army and Navy, as well as serving, in smaller numbers, in the armed forces of the Confederate States of America.
- 1870, Filipinos mestizos studying in New Orleans form the first Filipino Association in the United States, the "Sociedad de Beneficencia de los Hispanos Filipinos".

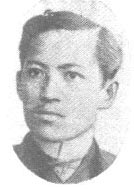
José Rizal around the time of his visit to the United States

- 1888, José Rizal arrives at the port of San Francisco for his trip through the United States.
- 1898, on May 1, the United States Navy decisively defeated Spain in the Battle of Manila Bay, the first battle of the Spanish–American War, beginning the American Colonial Era in the Philippines. On June 12, Filipino revolutionaries declare independence from Spain in Kawit, Cavite. Prior to this year, Ramon Reyes Lala becomes the first naturalized Filipino American.
- 1899, Philippine–American War begins.

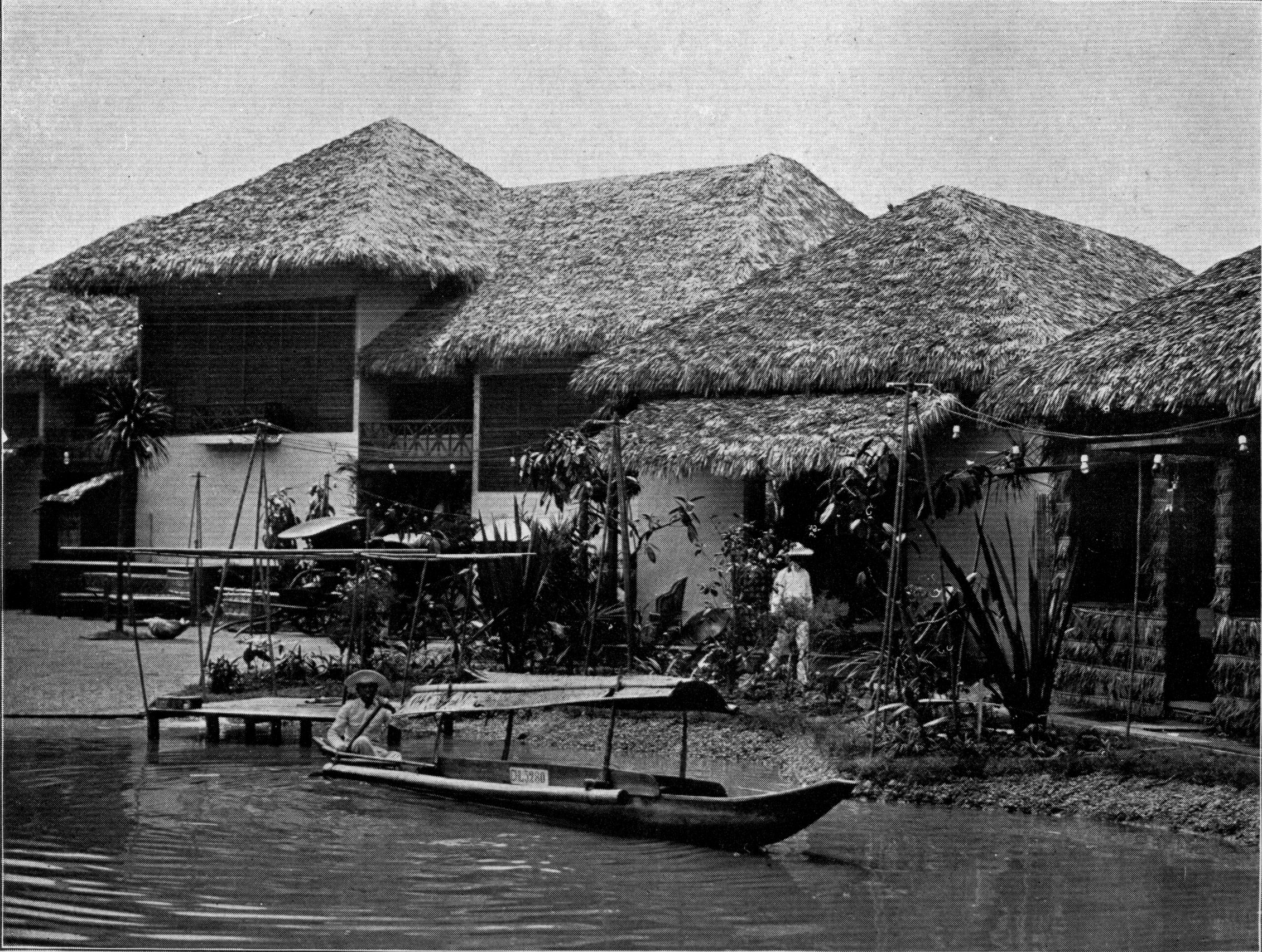
Philippine village at the Pan-American Exposition in 1901

- 1901, United States Navy begins recruiting Filipinos.
- 1902, Philippine–American War ends. Philippine Bill of 1902 passed by the U.S. Congress.
- 1903, First Pensionados, Filipinos invited to attend college in the United States on American government scholarships, arrive.
- 1906, First Filipino laborers migrate to the United States to work on the Hawaiian sugarcane and pineapple plantations, California and Washington asparagus farms, Washington lumbercamps and Alaska salmon canneries. About 200 Filipino "pensionados" are brought to the U.S. to get an American education.
- 1907, Benito Legarda and Pablo Ocampo, become the first Resident Commissioners from the Philippines, in the United States House of Representatives.
- 1910, First Filipino, Vicente Lim, attends West Point.
- 1911, José B. Nísperos becomes the first Asian American to be awarded the Medal of Honor. Nevada became the first state to include Filipinos, referring to them as "Malays", in their miscegenation law.
- 1912, Filipino Association of Philadelphia (now known as Filipino American Association of Philadelphia, Inc., or FAAPI) is founded by Agripino Jaucian; it is perhaps the oldest Filipino organization in continuous existence in the United States. The name change came about to include the growing number of American wives.
- 1913, Several months after the Battle of Bud Bagsak, armed resistance ended, finishing the Moro Rebellion.
- 1915, Telesforo Trinidad becomes the only Asian American sailor, as of 2010, to earn the Medal of Honor.
- 1917, Philippine National Guard mustered into federal service
- 1919, USS Rizal is commissioned into the United States Navy. On August 31 lawyer and community leader Pablo Manlapit organizes the Filipino Labor Federation to demand higher wages and better working conditions for sakadas.
- 1920s, Filipino labor leaders organize unions and strategic strikes to improve working and living conditions. Among the union organizers there were individuals who had harbored communist sentiments, as well as those who were nationalistic and anti-communist.
- 1924, during a labor strike in Hawaii, as a result of violence by Visayans strikers against Ilocano non-strikers, 16 strikers and four law enforcement officials were killed during the Hanapepe massacre.
- 1927, Anti-Filipino riots occur in the Yakima Valley, Washington.
- 1928, Filipino businessman Pedro Flores opens Flores yo-yos, which is credited with starting the yo-yo craze in the United States. He came up with and copyrighted the word "yo-yo". He also applied for and received a trademark for the Flores Yo-yo, which was registered on July 22, 1930. His company went on to become the foundation of the later Duncan yo-yo company. Anti-Filipino riots occur in the Wenatchee Valley.
- 1929, An anti-Filipino riot occurs in Exeter, California.
- 1930, Anti-Filipino riots break out in Watsonville and other California rural communities, in part because of Filipino men having intimate relations with white women, which was in violation of the California anti-miscegenation laws of the time. The Filipino Federation of America building in Stockton was bombed. A Filipino labor camp was bombed in the Imperial Valley.
- 1933, After the Supreme Court of California found in Roldan v. Los Angeles County that existing laws against marriage between white persons and "Mongoloids" did not bar a Filipino man from marrying a white woman, California's anti-miscegenation law, Civil Code Section 60 was amended to prohibit marriages between white persons and members of the "Malay race" (e.g. Filipinos).
- 1934, The Tydings–McDuffie Act, known as the Philippine Independence Act, limited Filipino immigration to the U.S. to 50 persons a year (not to apply to persons coming or seeking to come to the Territory of Hawaii); A Filipino Labor Union Incorporated camp was attacked in Salinas after a failed strike.
- 1935, Philippines becomes self-governing with the Commonwealth of the Philippines inaugurated. The Filipino Repatriation Act of 1935 provided free one-way transportation for Filipinos wishing to repatriate, but was largely unsuccessful.
- 1936, Fe del Mundo continues her education at Harvard Medical School.

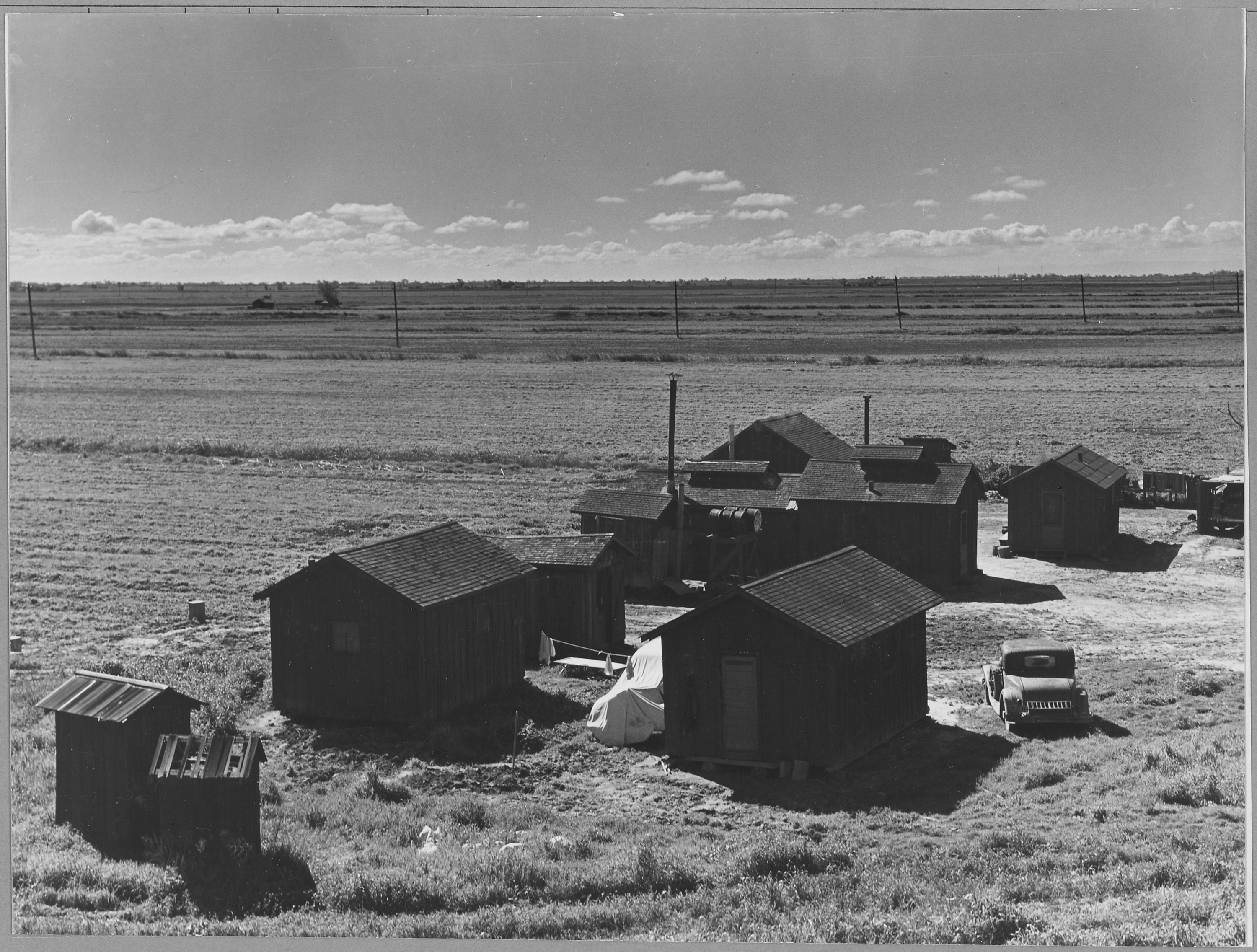
Company labor camp for Filipino farm laborers on Ryer Island in 1940

- 1941, Washington Supreme Court rules unconstitutional the Anti-Alien Land Law of 1937 which banned Filipino Americans from owning land.
- Early 1942, Filipinos communities in the United States began to designate themselves as Filipinos to avoid anti-Japanese discrimination
- April 1942, First and Second Filipino Regiments formed in the U.S. composed of Filipino agricultural workers.

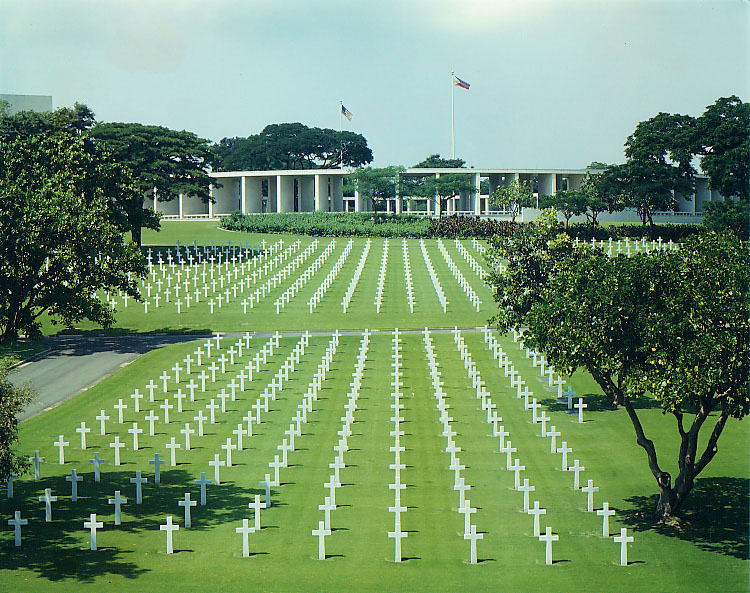
Manila American Cemetery and Memorial

- May 1942, After the fall of Bataan and Coregidor to the Japanese, the U.S. Congress passes a law which grants U.S. citizenship to Filipinos and other aliens who served under the U.S. Armed Forces.

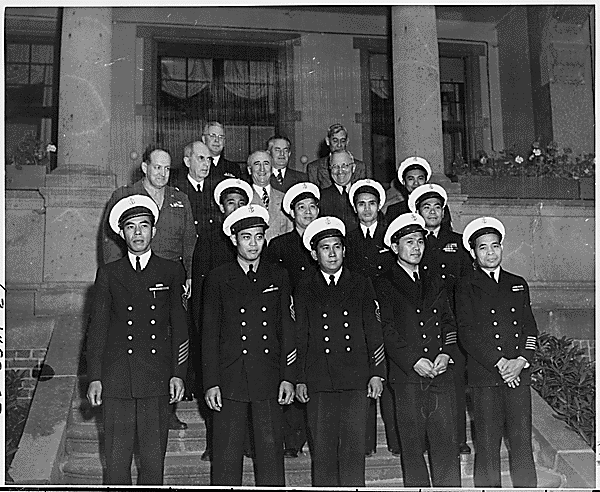
President Truman and members of his party pose on the north steps of the "Little White House", the President's residence in Potsdam, Germany during the Potsdam Conference, with their Filipino stewards.

- 1946, President Truman signs the Rescission Act of 1946, taking away the veterans benefits pledged to Filipino service members during world War II. Only four thousand service members were able to gain citizenship during this period. The United States recognizes Philippine Independence through the Treaty of Manila. America Is in the Heart by Carlos Bulosan published. Filipino Naturalization Act allows naturalization of Filipino Americans, granted citizenship to those who arrived prior to March 1943.
- 1948, Vicki Draves wins two Olympic gold medals; as of 2010 is the only Filipino to have won a gold medal. California Supreme Court rules California's anti-miscegenation law unconstitutional in the case of Perez v. Sharp, ending racially based prohibitions on marriage in the state (although it wasn't until Loving v. Virginia in 1967 that interracial marriages were legalized nationwide). Celestino Alfafara wins California Supreme Court decision allowing aliens the right to own property.
- 1955, Peter Aduja becomes first Filipino American elected to office as a member of the Hawaii Territorial House of Representatives.
- 1956, Bobby Balcena becomes first Asian American to play Major League baseball, playing for the Cincinnati Reds.
- 1965, Congress passes the Immigration and Nationality Act which facilitates entry for skilled Filipino workers. Delano grape strike begins when members of Agricultural Workers Organizing Committee led by Philip Vera Cruz, Larry Dulay Itliong, Benjamin Gines, Mariano Armington, Andy Imutan and Pete Velasco with mostly Filipino farm workers. The last Filipino village, Manila Village, in the Louisiana Bayou is destroyed by Hurricane Betsy.
- 1967, The Philippine (now Pilipino) American Collegiate Endeavor (PACE) founded at San Francisco State College (now San Francisco State University).
- 1969, Filipino Students Association (FSA) founded by Filipino American students at University of California, Berkeley during the Third World Movement; later renamed the Pilipino American Alliance. Dr. Antonio Ragadio, President of the Filipino Dental Association of Northern California, and Estrella Salaver, President and Founder of the Philippine American Cultural Foundation, work with Assemblyman Willie Brown and Senator Milton Marks to pass bill allowing Filipino and other foreign dentists to take the California qualifying examinations to practice in California.
- 1972, United States Coast Guard discontinued its program to enlist Filipinos from the Philippines.
- 1973, Larry Asera becomes the first Filipino American elected in the Continental United States, being elected to the city council of Vallejo.
- 1974, Benjamin Menor appointed first Filipino American in a state's highest judiciary office as Justice of the Hawaii State Supreme Court. Thelma Buchholdt is the first Filipino American, and first Asian American, woman elected to a state legislature in the United States, in the Alaska House of Representatives.
- 1975, Kauai's Eduardo Malapit elected first Filipino American mayor in the United States.
- 1977, Evictions are carried out of elderly Filipinos from the International Hotel in Manilatown, San Francisco, effectively ending the community.

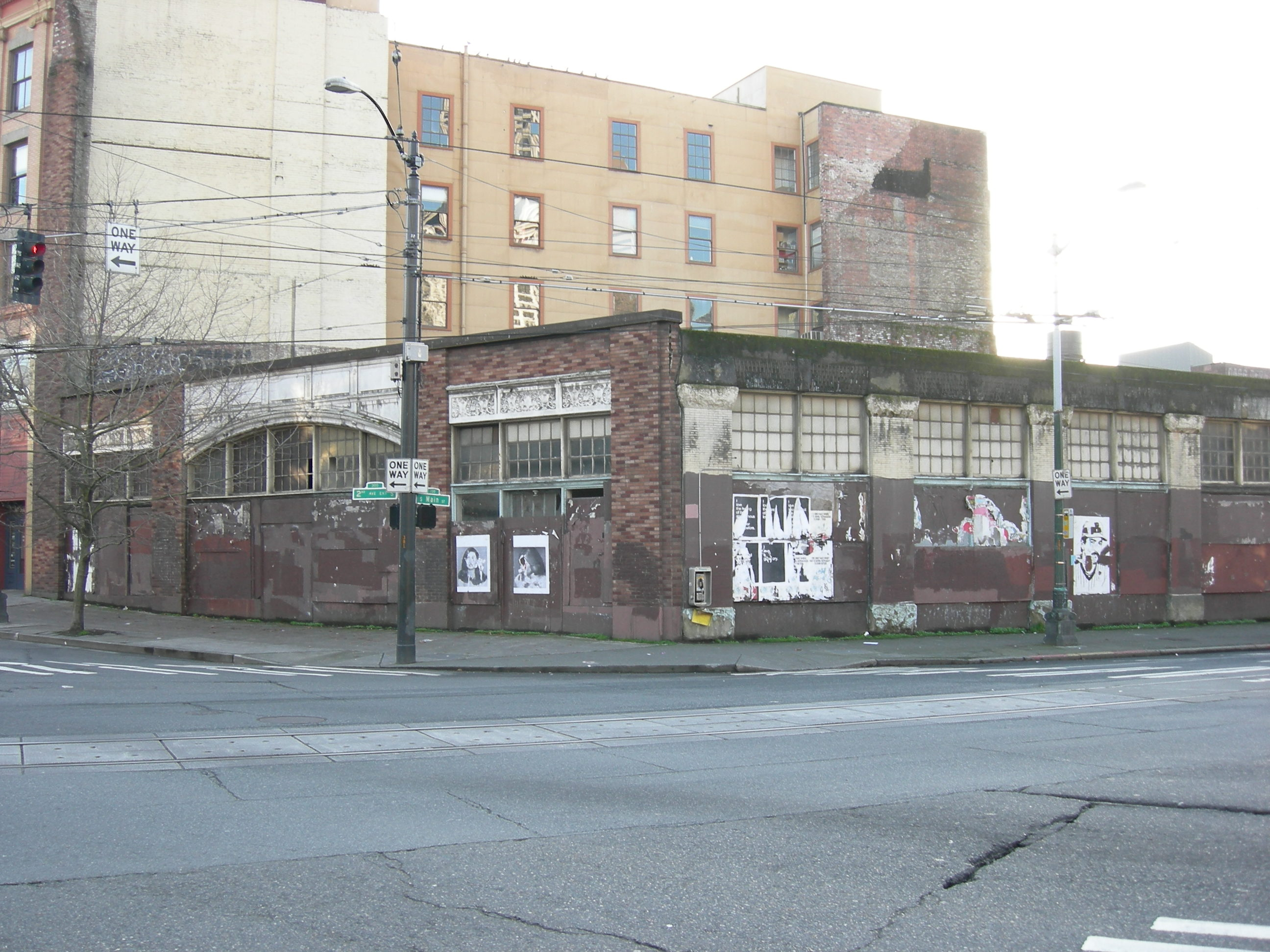
The building where Domingo and Viernes were assassinated.

- 1978, Alfred Laureta becomes the first Filipino American federal judge, serving on the District Court for the Northern Mariana Islands.
- 1981, Filipino American labor activists Silme Domingo and Gene Viernes are both assassinated June 1, 1981, inside a Seattle downtown union hall. International Hotel in Manilatown, San Francisco is demolished.
- 1983, California Governor Jerry Brown appoints Ronald Quidachay as first Filipino-American judge to the San Francisco Municipal Court.
- 1990, David Mercado Valderrama becomes first Filipino American elected to a state legislature in the Continental United States, serving Prince George's County in Maryland. Immigration reform Act of 1990 is passed by the U.S. Congress granting U.S. citizenship to Filipino World War II veterans; more than 20,000 veterans naturalized due to the act.
- 1992, Velma Veloria becomes first Asian American elected to the Washington State Legislature. Bobby Scott becomes the first person with Filipino heritage elected to the United States House of Representatives. Eleanor Mariano becomes the first female Physician to the President; later Mariano becomes the first female director of the White House Medical Unit (1994), and the first Filipino American flag officer (2000). The United States Navy ends its program to enlist Filipinos from the Philippines, due to the end of the Military Base Agreement.
- 1994, Benjamin J. Cayetano becomes the first Filipino American governor in the United States.
- 1995, The nation's largest Filipino mural, Gintong Kasaysayan, Gintong Pamana (Filipino Americans: A Glorious History, A Golden Legacy) in Los Angeles is unveiled and dedicated with over 600 people attending. Edward Soriano becomes the first Filipino American general officer.
- 1999, U.S. postal worker Joseph Ileto was murdered in a hate crime in Chatsworth, California, and whose death is often overlooked outside of the Filipino American community. The Carlos Bulosan Memorial Exhibit opens in Seattle's Eastern Hotel in the International District, honoring the Filipino novelist and poet Carlos Bulosan. A street on Fort Sam Houston is named after Medal of Honor recipient Jose Calugas.
- 2000, Robert Bunda elected Hawaii Senate President, the First Filipino American to hold the position. Angela Perez Baraquio becomes first Filipino American crowned as Miss America. John Ensign, who has a Filipino great-grandparent, is elected to the United States Senate.
- 2002, in April, the Bataan Death March Memorial, is dedicated in Las Cruces, New Mexico; it is the first, and only, federally funded memorial for the Bataan Death March. In August, Historic Filipinotown is designated by Los Angeles
- 2003, Philippine Republic Act No. 9225, also known as the Citizenship Retention and Re-Acquisition Act of 2003 enacted, allowing natural-born Filipinos naturalized in the United States and their unmarried minor children to reclaim Filipino nationality and hold dual citizenship.
- 2005, Hurricane Katrina impacts New Orleans, damaging or destroying the work of Marina Espina, research of Filipino history in New Orleans dating back to the 18th century; it also displaced many Filipino American families that lived in the area for over 7 generations.
- 2006, first monument dedicated to Filipino soldiers who fought for the United States in World War II unveiled in Historic Filipinotown, Los Angeles, California. A portion of California State Route 54 is named the Filipino-American Highway. Congress passes legislation that commemorates 100 Years of Filipino Migration to the United States. Hawaii celebrates the centennial of Filipinos in Hawaii.
- 2007, First American public park built with Filipino themed design features unveiled in LA's Historic Filipinotown.
- 2008, Bruce Reyes-Chow, 3rd generation Filipino and Chinese American was Elected Moderator of Presbyterian Church (USA).
- 2009, Filipino American History Month is recognized in California. Steve Austria becomes "the first, first-generation Filipino to be elected to the United States Congress." Mona Pasquil becomes first Filipino American, and first Asian American, lieutenant governor of California.
- 2011, Amado Gabriel Esteban becomes the first Filipino American president of a university, Seton Hall University, in the United States.
- 2012, Lorna G. Schofield becomes a Filipino American federal judge. Rob Bonta, becomes the first Filipino American elected to the California State Legislature.
- 2013, California passed legislation that required that Filipino contributions to the state's history be included in the curriculum.
- 2014, an overpass on the Filipino-American Highway is named Itliong-Vera Cruz Memorial Bridge, named for two prominent Filipino American leaders of the Delano Grape Strike, Larry Itliong and Philip Vera Cruz
- 2015, Ralph Deleon, who was later highlighted in a 2016 speech about immigration by then-presidential candidate Donald Trump, is convicted of provide material support to terrorists. Itliong-Vera Cruz Middle School, in Union City, California becomes the first school in the United States named for a Filipino American.
- 2017, Oscar A. Solis becomes the first Filipino American Catholic diocesan bishop in the United States; he was elevated to a bishop in Los Angeles in 2004, being the first Filipino American bishop.
- 2018, Erin Entrada Kelly becomes the first Filipino American to win the John Newbery Medal for the most distinguished contribution to American literature for children. Robert Lopez becomes the first person to earn a double Academy, Emmy, Grammy, and Tony Awards winner (EGOT).
- 2019, Darren Criss becomes the first Filipino American to win a Golden Globe.
- 2020, Dozens of Filipino American healthcare workers have died due to the COVID-19 pandemic in the New Jersey-New York area, and elsewhere. Of all nurses who died with a COVID-19 infection nationally in 2020, almost a third were Filipino Americans.

== See also ==
- History of Asian Americans
- History of Filipino nurses in the United States
- Filipino American history in San Diego
- Filipino American military history in World War II
