= Asian American university resource center =

Type of cultural center

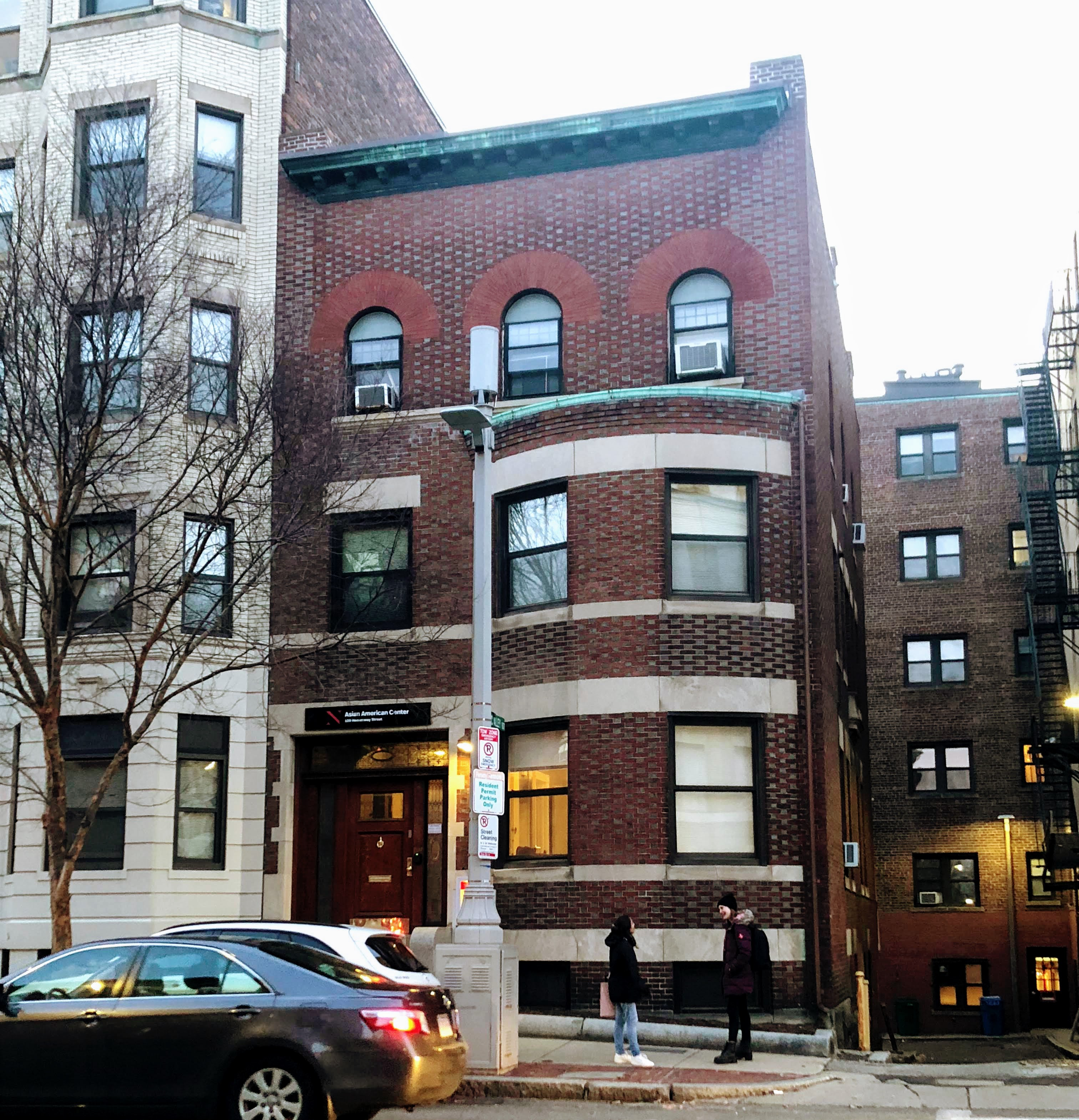
The Asian American Center at Northeastern University

Asian American university resource centers are designated physical spaces on American university campuses that support the Asian American student population. Some are housed within other university owned buildings, while others are entire separate buildings. Although their main function is to provide a gathering place for students, Asian American resource centers also provide other services, such as peer mentoring, mental health services, Asian American libraries, as well as promote cultural awareness to the campus community at large.

Asian American resource centers are distinct from centers for Asian studies. Their primary goal is not to support students pursuing Asian studies, but to support students who identify as Asian American.

== History of Asian students in higher education ==
Although Asian immigration to the United States began as early as 1763, there were not many Asian American students in higher education until the last 80 years. Many early immigrants were single male laborers past schooling age, meaning there were few people of Asian descent in the American education system. In 1854, Yung Wing became the first student of Chinese descent to graduate from university in the United States. Although Yung would return to China to work in the Qing dynasty government, he and other officials created the Chinese Educational Mission in 1872. This program sent 120 Chinese students to the United States to finish their high school and college educations. However, misgivings from both the Chinese and American governments led to termination of the program and recall of the students in 1881.

Additionally, the U.S. government began passing anti-Asian legislation during this time. Beginning in 1870, the Naturalization Act of 1870 revoked any citizenship previously granted to Chinese Americans, including Yung Wing. The Page Act, Chinese Exclusion Act, and Geary Act, were then passed from 1875-1892. These pieces of legislation essentially forbade immigration of Chinese women and male laborers, as well as restricted the ability of Chinese residents to move freely throughout the country and revoked several legal rights.

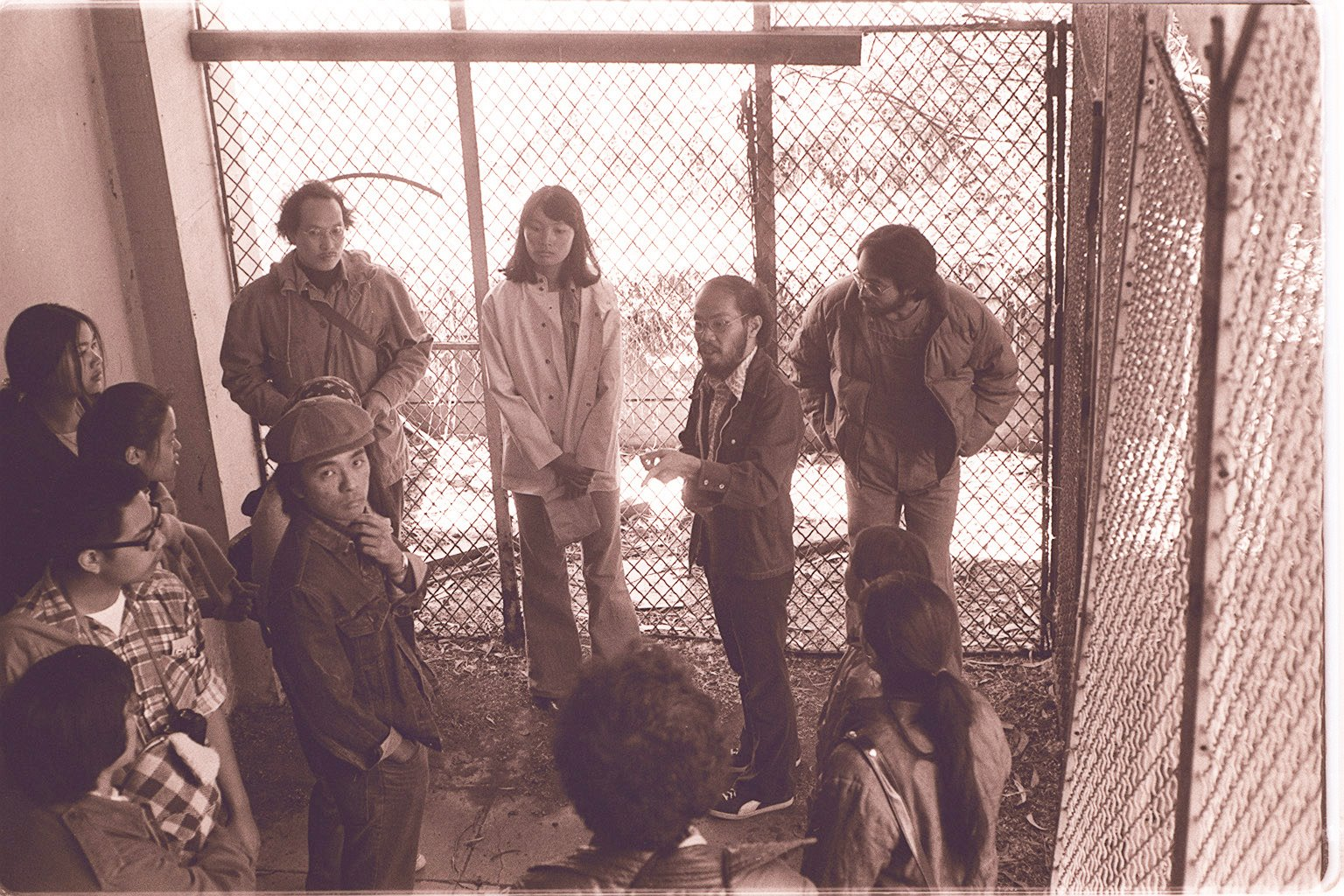
A tour group at the Angel Island Barracks ca. 1975-1976. Angel Island was the most common port of entry for Asian immigrants on the West Coast. These barracks are where detained immigrants were held.

Similar legislation continued to be passed in the 20th century. Following the 1907 Gentlemen's Agreement, which was an unofficial ban on Japanese immigration, the Immigration Acts of 1917 and 1924, barred all immigration from Asia. Furthermore, the Filipino Repatriation Act of 1935, which allowed federally subsidized passage for Filipinos to return to the Philippines, was passed in part due to growing anti-Asian sentiment caused by World War I and the U.S. acquisition of the Philippines.

It was not until the Chinese Exclusion Repeal Act and the Immigration and Nationality Acts of 1952 and 1965 that all Asian immigration and naturalization was again legalized. As a result, there was a sudden boom in Asian immigration in the 1960s, and Asian Americans were much more commonly seen in the American education system and on American university campuses.

The growing Asian student population at universities led to specific community challenges and needs. Additionally, rising political tensions involving the Vietnam War contributed to increasing community outrage. In the late 1960s through the mid 1970s, Asian American college students joined Asian Americans across the country to form the Asian American Movement. In contrast to previous activism, this movement was specific to Asian Americans, yet also drew together a diverse set of Chinese, Japanese, Filipino, Korean, and Indian Americans for the first time. In response to growing community outcry and organization, the first Asian American campus resource programs were initiated during this time. Today, these modest student-led support operations have grown into the official university-staffed resource centers that are found across the United States today.

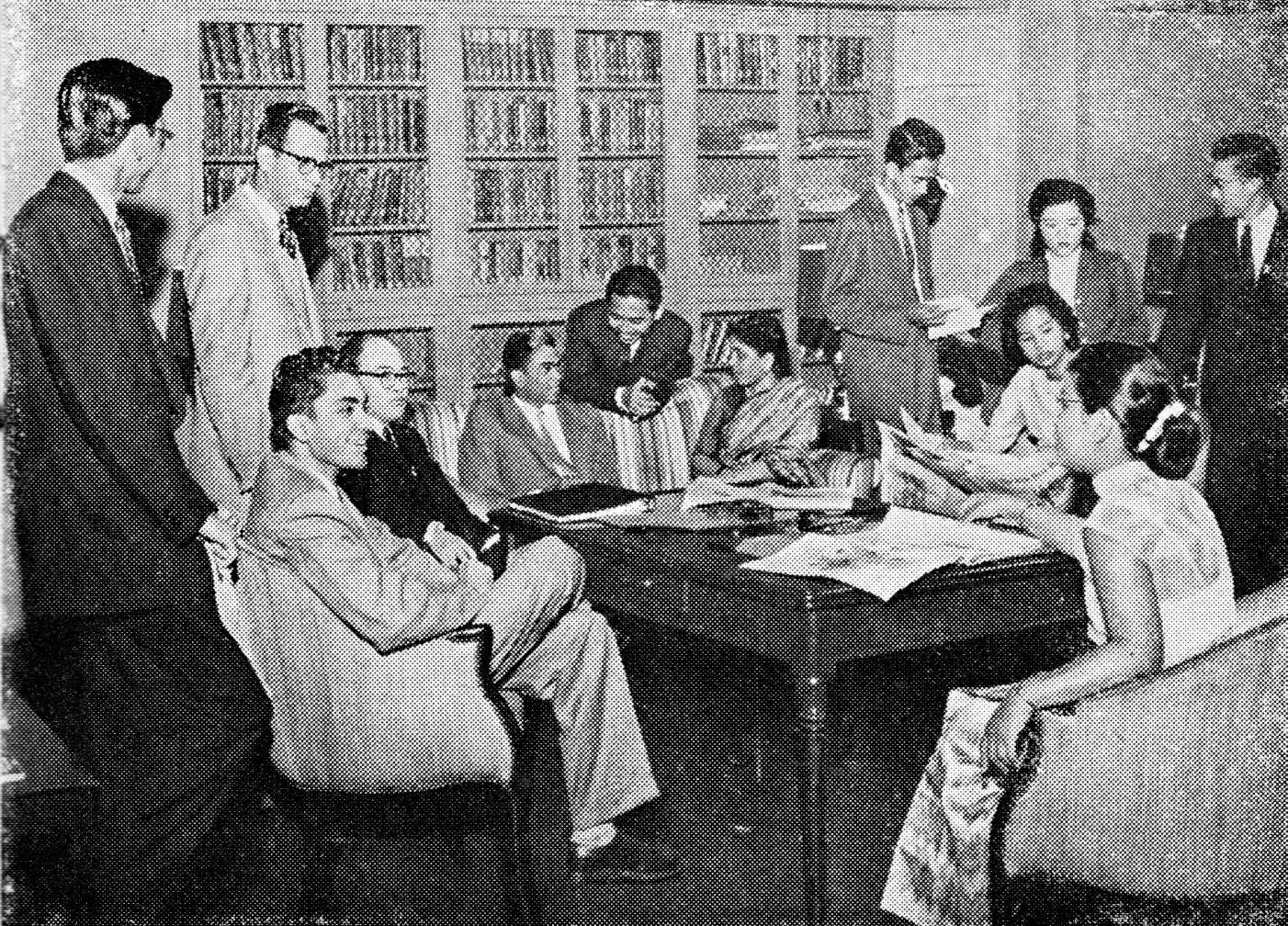
Asian students at Clemson University in 1957

=== Asian American student population ===
In 2017, Asian students made up 9.8% of the American full-time undergraduate college student population. This is up from 7.5% in 2010. Despite making up less of the student population than all other major ethnic groups, Asians were most likely to enroll, with 57.2% of such young adults enrolled in a university program. Additionally, Asian adults have the highest percentage of degree holders among all American minority groups.

However, these demographics are incomplete. U.S. Census data and other surveys group all people of Asian or Pacific Islander descent in one group. Not only does this not differentiate between Asian American students and Asian international students, it also treats all the diverse backgrounds that are part of the Asian community as a monolith. While well established East Asian communities are well represented in these statistics, other students from South and Southeast Asian backgrounds face many other socioeconomic hurdles in receiving higher education, which may not be properly reflected in current reporting demographics.

== List of known locations ==
- California State Polytechnic University, Pomona
- California State University, Fullerton
- California State University, Los Angeles
- Colorado State University
- Cornell University
- Indiana University Bloomington
- Northeastern University
- Northern Illinois University
- Oregon State University
- Pitzer College
- Pomona College
- Purdue University
- Rutgers University–New Brunswick
- Stanford University
- Tufts University
- University of Arizona
- University of California, Riverside
- University of California, Santa Barbara
- University of California, Santa Cruz
- University of Connecticut
- University of Florida
- University of Illinois at Chicago
- University of Illinois at Urbana–Champaign
- University of Iowa
- University of Massachusetts Amherst
- University of Minnesota - Twin Cities
- University of North Carolina at Chapel Hill
- University of Northern Colorado
- University of Oklahoma
- University of Pennsylvania
- University of Southern California
- Washington State University
- Yale University

== Provided services ==
In addition to the benefits associated with being a physical gathering space that has received university recognition and often endowment, Asian American resource centers serve a plethora of different purposes. As part of the university community, resource centers play a large part in cultural development. This is through both holding cultural events that spread awareness to the entire campus, as well as housing Asian American resources and Asian American specific programming.

=== Notable events ===
Events hosted by Asian American resource centers tend to fall into two categories based on their intended audiences: community-focused or campus-wide. Some events, such as an open house, are specifically intended for Asian American students. Others, such as events promoting Asian American and Pacific Islander Heritage Month or notable speaker events, may enrich both the Asian American community in addition to the entire campus at large.

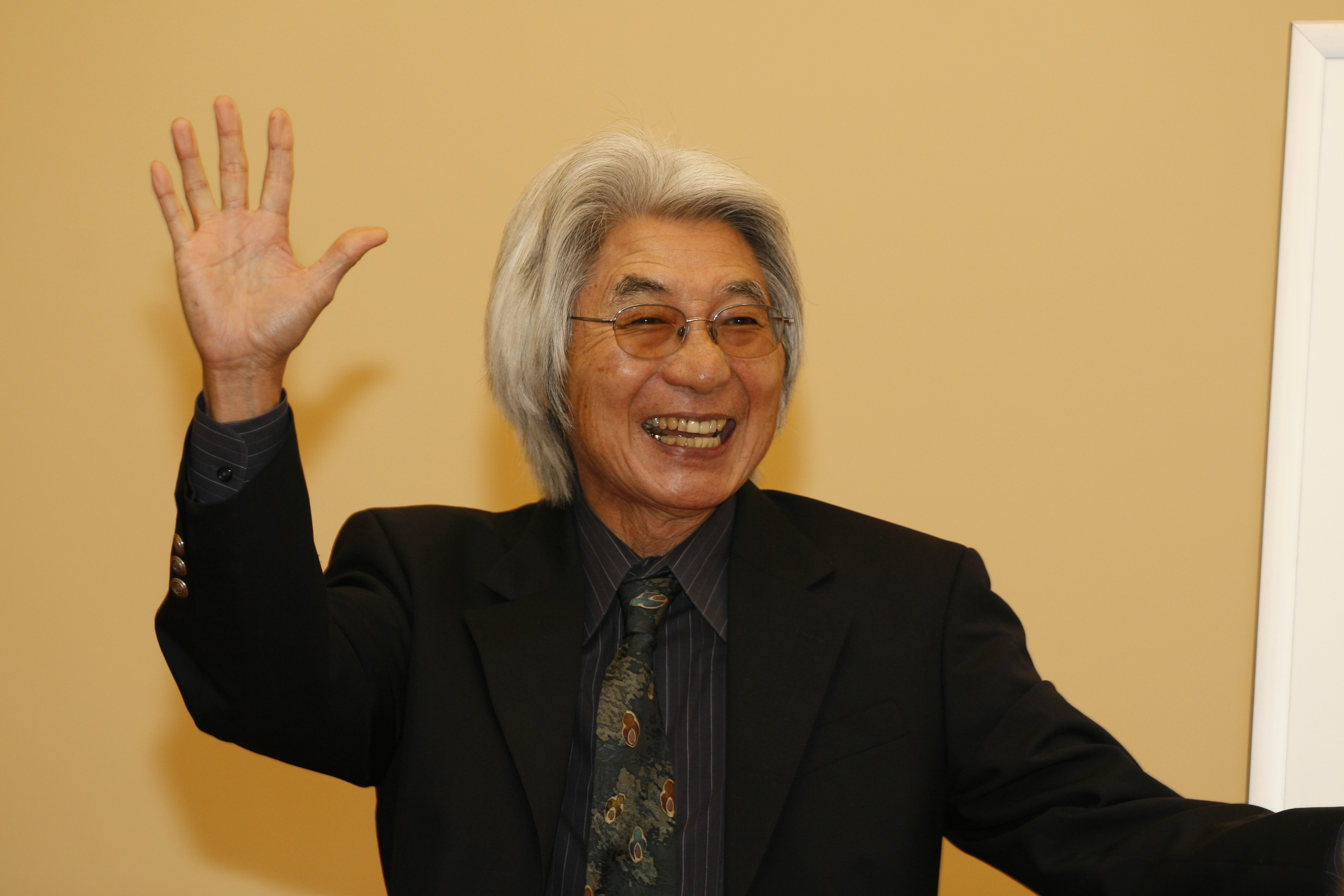
Ronald Takaki at a speaker event hosted at Northeastern University. Takaki was a prominent Asian American scholar and author whose works are often staples of Asian American libraries.

=== Resources ===
One of the most common resources is an Asian American library. These libraries contain literature written about, by, and for Asian Americans. This includes both nonfiction and fiction, as well as less traditional forms of media, such as DVDs of prominent Asian American films. Additionally, resource center staff and other university faculty are also available to provide different types of guidance. Resource center staff members are available to answer specific queries about programming, as well as offer general advising. Centers also often have a counselor that can provide specific mental health services. Other university faculty members of Asian American descent may also have offices in Asian American resource centers. These other faculty can provide career advising geared towards their area of specialty and also serve as positive role models for students.

=== Programming ===
A hallmark of Asian American resource centers are their student development programs. The types of development programs vary greatly from center to center, but cover a variety of topics. Topics include academic success, addressing racism and stereotypes, intersectional identities, as well as leadership, to name a few. Often, these topics will be included in peer mentoring programs. In these programs, upperclassmen and faculty take on a nurturing role for underclassmen. This type of peer mentoring allows younger students to access positive role models they can identify with, as well as normalize the idea of Asian American leadership and participation in cultural activities. Additionally, older students have the opportunity to experience leadership positions during their undergraduate careers.

Asian American resource centers also serve as a home for on-campus Asian American organizations. Although oftentimes these organizations operate semi-autonomously, the resource centers serves as a support system for their individual missions. By doing so, the resource center creates an environment that nurtures minority student advocacy and allows Asian Americans of all different backgrounds to learn from each other in a safe and supportive environment.

Ultimately, the purpose of the center is to provide a safe space for Asian American students to both exist as minorities on the university campus and grow and develop their identities.

== Importance ==
=== Representation ===
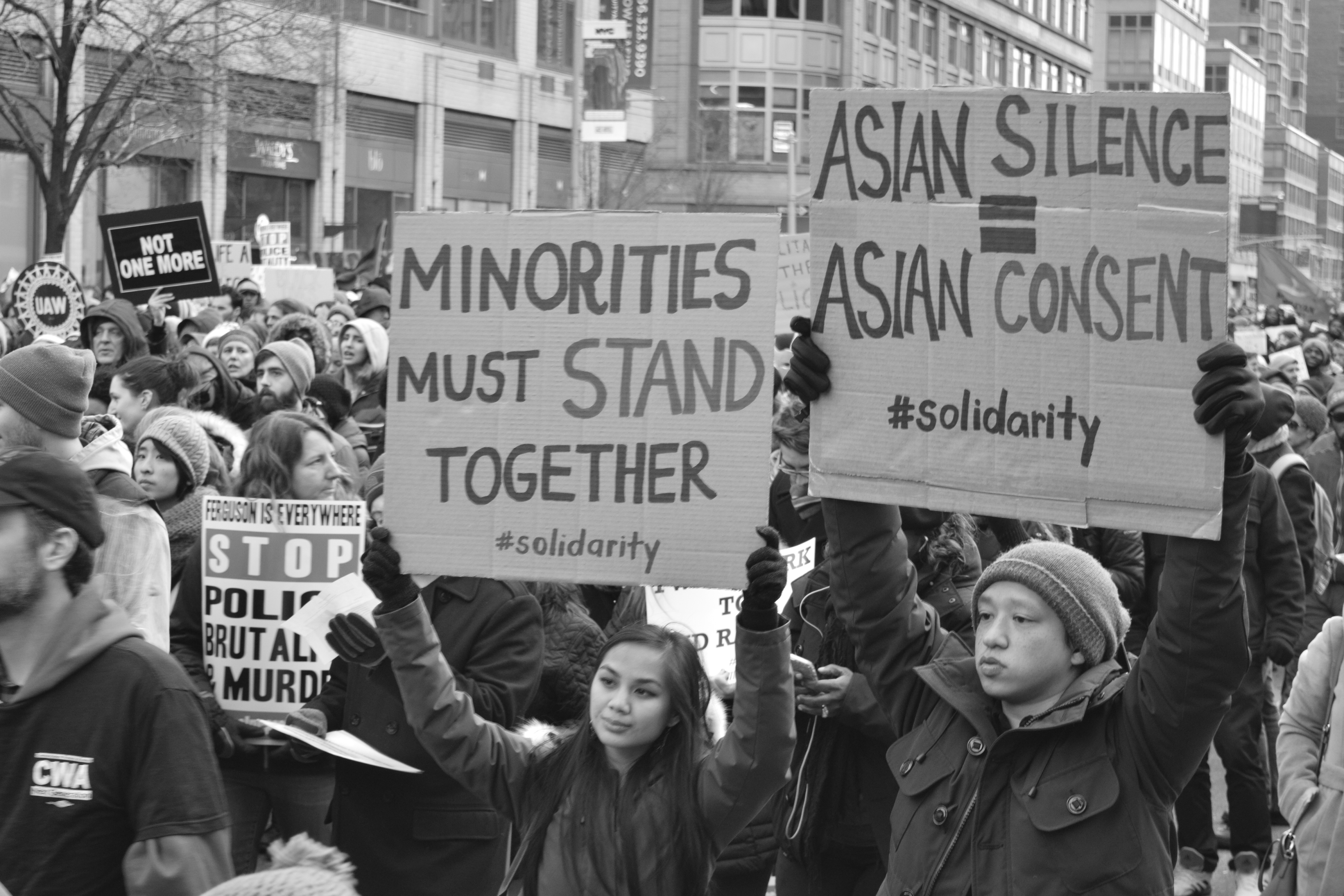
Asian American protestors at a 2014 protest in New York.

Asian American resource buildings and offices are important beacons of Asian representation. As a hub of activity, Asian American resource centers provide a launching point for large scale events and programs that increase Asian American visibility. Additionally, due to many centers' early roots with the Asian American Movement, resource centers also frequently act as a home base for Asian American activism. This can be both through advocating for Asian American specific issues (such as discrimination and lack of representation), or forming a coalition in championing wider challenges.

Staff at the resource center also provide accountability to student groups. While the overall goal is to promote more Asian representation and visibility, staff also prevent groups from representing Asians and Asian culture in an inaccurate or hurtful manner, as well as from perpetuating harmful stereotypes. For example, events that suggest that Asians are a model minority or rely too much on stereotypical martial arts themes are discouraged by center staff.

=== Mental health ===
Resource centers often have a significant impact on student mental health, both through official health services and by approaching systemic problems that affect Asian American mental health. Resource centers are connected to the overall university health and counseling services, but also frequently have in-house counselors and trained staff. These faculty can provide a level of care that may not be found elsewhere; as individuals of Asian descent themselves, they have first-hand experience of many of the common health stressors Asian American university students face. This added cultural context allows for a deeper initial connection between a student and a counselor, which has been proven to improve counseling and therapy outcomes.

Additionally, resource center staff and much of the programming they provide specifically address the challenges Asian Americans face in regards to racism, discrimination, and microaggressions. These daily challenges are major stressors in the Asian American community. The vast amount of resources that can be found at Asian American resource centers help address these stressors by providing both the space and tools to properly acknowledge, share, and fight against the trauma associated with such experiences.

Asian American resource centers serve as safe spaces. Students are free to develop their identities and address any issues or concerns they wish. The resource center provides a positive environment where this development is possible.

=== Community growth ===
The programming, staff, and other resources available at Asian American resource centers allow the Asian American community on campus to continually develop and improve themselves. A key tenet of this development space is unity of all individuals of Asian descent. Throughout history, Asians have been grouped together as one ethnic group in American society. This false monolith, in addition to sowing discrimination into American society, has been shown to also foster ignorance among the Asian community. Asian American resource centers serve as a space to come together and learn without judgement. In learning about the diverse cultural practices of different Asian and Pacific Islander communities, understanding and camaraderie is formed.
