= First landing of Filipinos in the United States =

Arrival of Filipinos to the current United States in 1587

Landing of the first Filipinos
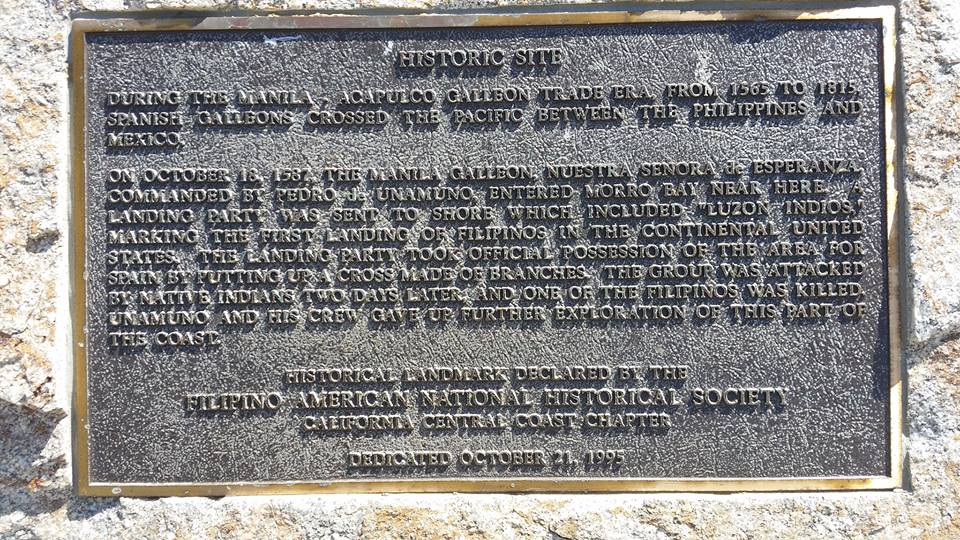
- Plaque dedicated in 1995

- The location of the landing of the first Filipinos First landing of Filipinos in the United States (California) First landing of Filipinos in the United States (the United States)
- 35.372285°N 120.861135°W
- Location: Morro Bay

History
- Built: 1995

On 18 October 1587, the first Filipinos landed in what is now the Continental United States at Morro Bay. They arrived aboard the Nuestra Señora de Buena Esperanza, which had sailed from Portuguese Macau, as part of the Manila galleon trade. During about three days of travels ashore around Morro Bay, the crew of the Nuestra Señora de Buena Esperanza came in contact with the Chumash people, ultimately resulting in the deaths of two crew members: one Spaniard and one Filipino.

Departing Morro Bay after the deaths of the crew members, the Nuestra Señora de Buena Esperanza eventually reached its intended destination of Acapulco. No other Filipino was brought to California until 1595. In 1995, a monument on Morro Bay was dedicated to commemorate the events of 1587. October has been designated as Filipino American History Month since 2009 in recognition of these events.

== Background ==
Thousands of years before their first contact with Europeans, the Chumash people established the region around the Channel Islands and areas from San Luis Obispo to Malibu as their territories. At the beginning of the 16th century, European explorers began to explore the Pacific. The Spanish traveled westward with Vasco Núñez de Balboa, first seeing the Pacific Ocean from Panama; then the Pacific was crossed by Ferdinand Magellan, who reached the Philippines. The Chumash's first contact with Europeans occurred on 10 October 1542, when Juan Rodríguez Cabrillo's expedition sailed into the area. Their next contact with Europeans would be 45 years later.

Beginning in the mid-16th century, Spain conducted its campaign to conquer the Philippine Islands, led by Miguel López de Legazpi. This concluded with Spanish forces repelling Chinese ambitions to control Manila. As a consequence of the conquest of the Philippines, in 1565 the Manila galleon trade began, sailing from Acapulco – initially to Cebu, and after 1571 to Manila. These ships were crewed largely by Filipinos. (Note: Spanish referred to Filipinos during the 16th century as "Indios Luzones".) The Filipinos who sailed experienced arduous conditions, poor rations, disease, and the lowest pay among the crew.

From 1582 until his death in 1586, Francisco Gali plied the Manila galleon route, initially as a navigator. On a return voyage to Mexico in 1584, Gali navigated the ship he was in to a high latitude, which brought the ship along the North American coast, which Gali had thought was astride the Strait of Anián. In 1585, a mission from Archbishop Pedro Moya de Contreras to survey the Californian coast, and to avoid China, was given to the westward-bound captain of the Manila galleon, who at that time was Gali.

Gali died in Manila later that year, leaving the mission to one Pedro de Unamuno. Unamuno was provided additional orders to search for Rica de Oro and Rica de Plata. Unamuno, who had sailed with Gali from Acapulco, had been paid by merchants there to acquire goods in China. Upon reaching Macao, Portuguese authorities seized his two galleons, leaving him and his crew trapped in China. Hearing of this, the Real Audiencia of Manila sought the arrest of Unamuno for disobeying the instructions to avoid China. Fortunately for Unamuno, who could have received the death penalty for his insubordination, Franciscans who wanted to return to Mexico provided funds to purchase a ship, a fragata, which was christened the Nuestra Señora de Buena Esperanza. One of those Franciscans was Martín Ignacio de Loyola; another person who came aboard for the eastward journey was a Japanese boy.

Leaving the Far East in mid-July 1587, the Nuestra Señora de Buena Esperanza sailed eastward across the Pacific Ocean for a largely uneventful trip. In early September, the ship was damaged when the "masts were sprung", or cracked. More than a month later, the ship spotted land through a fog, and fires were seen onshore. Initial reconnaissance led to the discovery of Morro Bay, which had resources that could replenish the ship's provisions; there were also trees which could be utilized for masts. When people were observed on a hill looking at their ship, it was decided that a landing party should go ashore and claim the bay.

== Landing ==
On 18 October, the feast day of San Lucas, the initial landing parties came ashore. One party consisted of Unamuno and a dozen soldiers. Another party of "Luzon Indians" and a priest; the priest was Father Martín Ignacio de Loyola, nephew of Ignatius of Loyola. Two of the Filipinos went ahead of the parties, scouting for the locals observed from the ship. Initial attempts to make contact with local people were unsuccessful. When a group of nine Native Americans was observed; they ran off before the landing party could attempt to communicate with them. After claiming possession of the land by placing a cross atop a hill as a sign of their claim, the landing party returned to the ship.

After a second landing the next day for exploration and the gathering of supplies for the ship, the landing party spent the night ashore. The next morning, part of the landing party was approached by 23 Native Americans, who ended up taking clothing and canteens from the landing party. Not long after, an attempt to capture Loyola was stopped when a gun was fired. Afterwards, the landing party began to return to their ship and was attacked, resulting in the deaths of one Spaniard and one Filipino, both due to javelin wounds, and several others being injured. Reinforced by a complement from the ship, the group repelled the attack. The next day, the 21 October, the galleon departed, continuing its journey to Acapulco.

== Aftermath ==
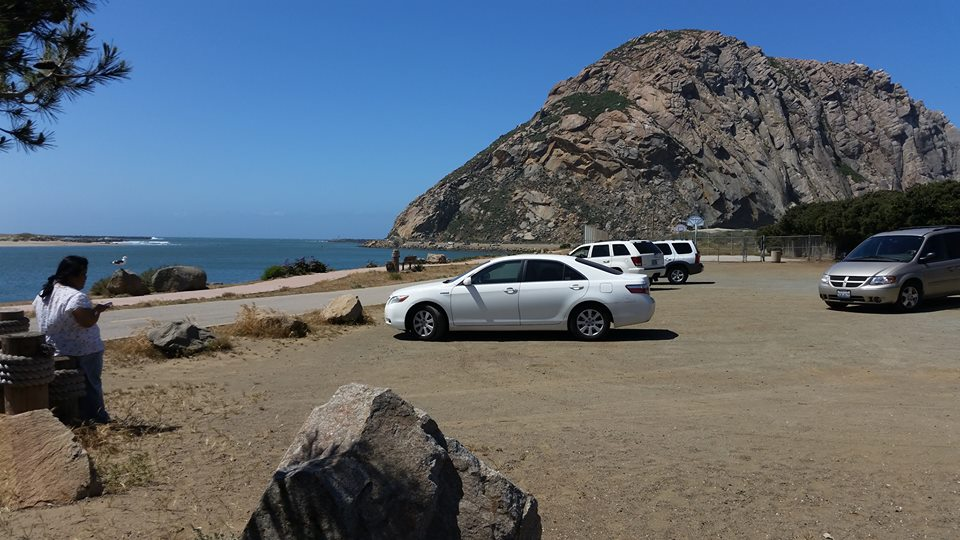
Looking roughly westward, the foreground has the back of the FANHS historic landmark, with Morro Rock in the background. Located in Coleman Park, on the north part of Morro Bay.

After departing Morro Bay, the Nuestra Señora de Buena Esperanza sailed southward. It was a few days behind the Santa Ana, which had sailed eastward at a lower latitude and was captured by privateer Thomas Cavendish, a fate which the Nuestra Señora de Buena Esperanza avoided. Attempts to sail southward along the coastline were made difficult due to poor weather, including fog. More than a month after departing Morro Bay, the Nuestra Señora de Buena Esperanza arrived at Acapulco. Inland expeditions were prohibited by the Spanish authorities following the hostility encountered at Morro Bay. After its initial voyage across the Pacific, the Nuestra Señora de Buena Esperanza continued to be utilized in the Manila galleon trade, but was lost off the coast of Negros Island in 1647.

The next documented landing of Filipinos in California was in November 1595, when the Manila galleon San Agustin was wrecked at Point Reyes, the first European ship to be wrecked on the California coast. Unlike the interaction of the crew of the Nuestra Señora de Buena Esperanza with the local people, the encounter of the San Agustín with the Coast Miwok did not result in any deaths. Following the wrecking of the San Agustin, which resulted in several deaths, the crew departed in a salvaged launch and reached Acapulco.

As late as the Portolà expedition in 1769–1770, the Chumash maintained a large population. However, by the 1910 United States census, fewer than one hundred remained. One reason for the reduction of their population was the introduction of Old World diseases, including pleuropneumonia and smallpox.

The discovery of "Puerto San Lucas" by the crew of the galleon was recorded in the log of the voyage. However, the discovery faded into obscurity, until 1929 when the log was translated into English, and published by the California Historical Society. Before then it was believed that Unamuno had sailed into Monterey Bay; another early 20th century source pointed towards Cape Mendocino or San Francisco Bay. More recently, the precise location of where the landing occurred has been disputed, citing inaccurate navigation tools and presumptions in past writings of the event.

The 1587 event marks the first documented instance of Asians in what is now California, or anywhere in what is now the United States, North America, the Americas. The landing of the first Filipinos at Morro Bay, which occurred 33 years before the events at Plymouth Rock, (Note: Plymouth Rock is seen as one of the symbols of the founding of the United States.) is often overlooked, even by Filipino Americans. For instance, the Filipinos who landed in 1587 have been described as "invading troops", and more focus is placed on Filipino immigration to the United States during, and after, the American period.

Although the landing was an important milestone, it would not be until the latter half of the 18th century that Filipinos began to settle in what would become part of the continental United States. Beginning in 1992, the Filipino American National Historical Society (FANHS) began efforts to commemorate the landing. On 21 October 1995, with the mayor of Morro Bay in attendance, a monument was placed at Morro Bay to commemorate the events of 1587. The monument was placed in Coleman Park. By 2009, after follow-up efforts by FANHS, Filipino American History Month was recognized by California, as well as nationally by resolutions in state and national legislatures; it occurs every October, in recognition of the landing at Morro Bay.

== See also ==
- History of Asian Americans
- History of California
- History of Filipino Americans
