= Filipino American National Historical Society =

Nonprofit organization founded 1982

The Filipino American National Historical Society (FANHS) is a nonprofit organization that documents Filipino American history.

== History ==
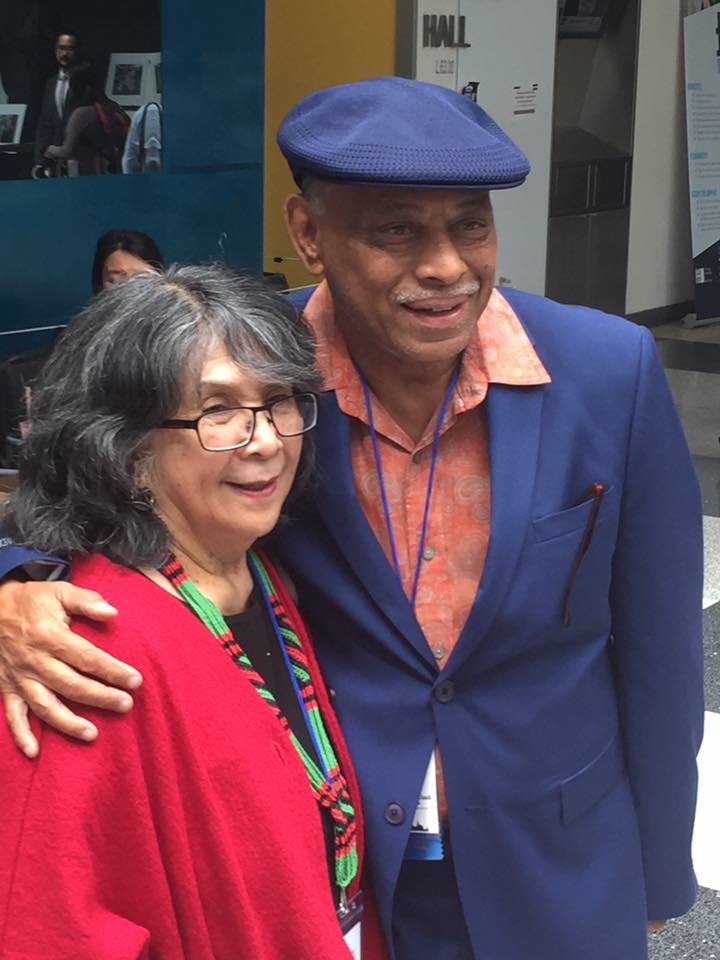
Dorothy Cordova and Joe Bataan at Filipino American National Historical Society 2016 Conference in New York

Filipino American National Historical Society (FANHS) was founded on 26 November 1982 in Seattle, Washington, by Dorothy Laigo Cordova and her husband Fred Cordova. The organization states that its mission is “to promote understanding, education, enlightenment, appreciation, and enrichment through the identification, gathering, preservation, and dissemination of the history and culture of Filipino Americans in the United States” with the goal of preserving and documenting Filipino American history.

FANHS was chartered in Washington on 7 January 1985. The national office and archives are housed in Seattle. The first board of trustees was elected with 27 members from 12 states on 1 November 1986. In the same year, Fred Cordova created the National Pinoy Archives. Dorothy Cordova served as executive director.

Past projects include the video Filipino Americans Discovering Their Past for the Future, the pictorial essay Filipinos: Forgotten Asian Americans; and various regional publications and photo exhibits. FANHS also contributed significantly to the Smithsonian traveling exhibit Singgalot: The Ties That Bind, which documents the history of Filipino Americans in the US.

== Filipino American History Month ==
Under the leadership of Fred Cordova, FANHS established Filipino American History Month (FAHM) in 1992. Since then, FAHM has been recognized by several states including New York, California, Hawaii, Minnesota, and Arkansas. In 2009, the U.S. Senate and Congress proclaimed October as Filipino-American History Month. In 2015 and 2016, President Obama officially recognized FAHM in October with a celebration in the White House.

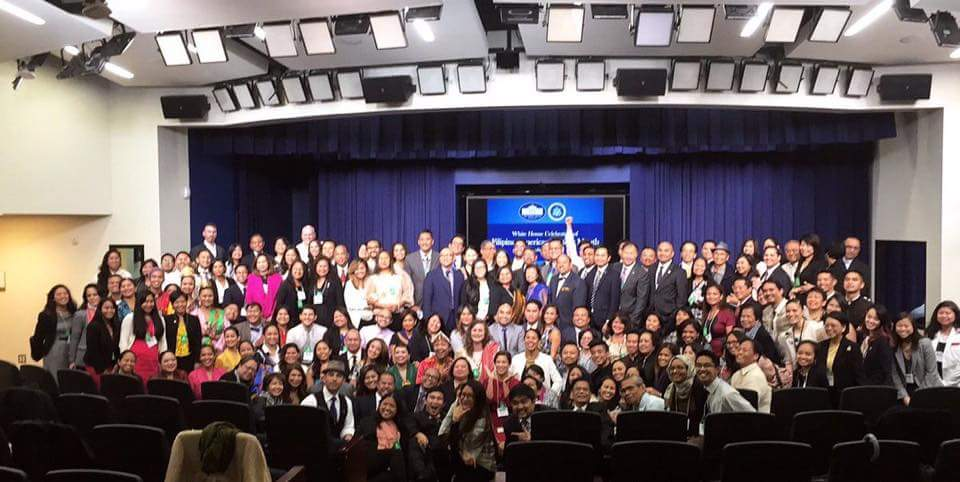
Crowd at the 2016 Filipino American History Month celebration at the White House

== Biennial National Conferences ==
Since 1987, FANHS has sponsored national conferences (later ratified as a biennial event) where people gather to share and present research, network with other Filipino Americans, and honor those who have produced innovative work in the field of historical research and analysis. Past conference host cities include: Seattle (1988), New Orleans (1990), Sacramento (1992), Chicago (1994), San Francisco (1996), and New York City (1998).

The 2000 conference was hosted by the Hampton Roads Chapter of FANHS in Virginia Beach, Virginia. The theme was "Forever Pinay/Pinoy: Legacies of the Filipino American Experience".

The 2002 conference was hosted at Loyola Marymount University in Los Angeles, California. Keynote speakers included Vicki Manalo Draves, the first Filipina/Asian-American Olympian and gold medalist.

The 2004 conference was hosted in St. Louis, Missouri.

The 2006 conference was hosted by the Filipino American Historical Society of Hawaii in Honolulu, Hawaii. It included a centennial celebration as it was in 1906 when the first wave of sakadas (farm workers) landed in Hawaii.

The 2008 conference was hosted by the Alaska Chapter of the organization, in Anchorage, Alaska. The theme was "Lure of the Salmon Song" referring to the tens of thousands of Filipino Alaskeros who worked in the Alaskan canneries since 1915.

The 2010 conference was held in Seattle, Washington, with the theme, "A Quest for Emergence: A Retrospective."

The 2012 conference was held in Albuquerque, New Mexico, with the theme "Resilience: A Filipino Legacy in a Global Community."

The 2014 conference was held in San Diego, California with the theme "Kapwa: Moving Forward in Unity." A memorial service was held to honor FANHS Founding President Fred Cordova who had died several months prior.

The 2016 conference was coordinated by Dr. Kevin Nadal and was held in New York City. The theme was "A Pinoy State of Mind: Building with Our Roots." Speakers included Jose Antonio Vargas, Ali Ewoldt, Paolo Montalban, Joe Bataan, Lorna G. Schofield, Geena Rocero, Ernabel Demillo, and Mia Alvar, among others.

As of 2018, FANHS has 35 chapters across the country. Each chapter is responsible for collecting historical documentation, memorabilia, and artifacts in their respective areas.

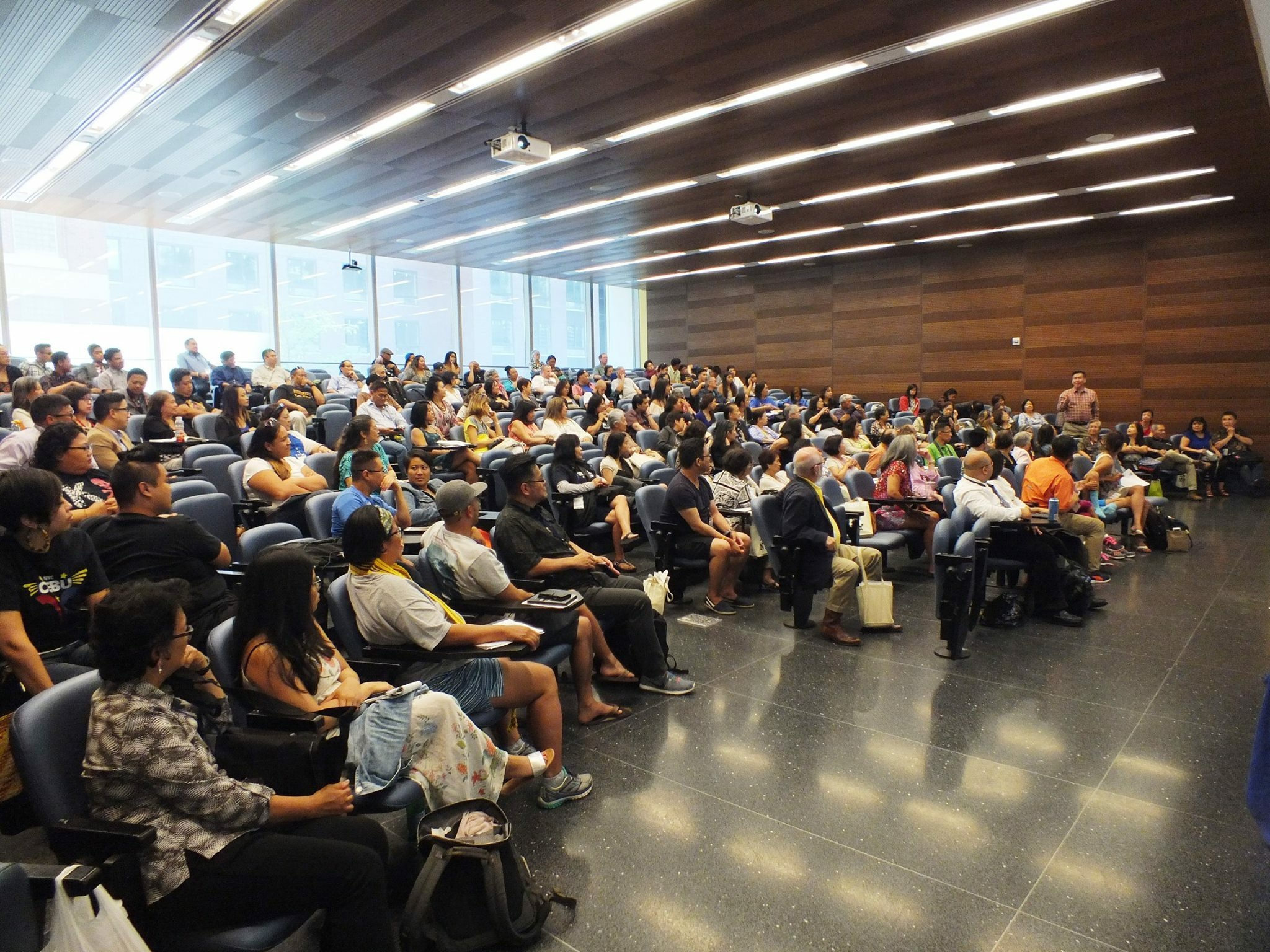
Crowd at the 2016 FANHS Conference in New York

== FANHS National Museum ==
The city of Stockton was chosen as the future site for the Filipino American National Historical Museum by the FANHS Board of Trustees at the 1994 Conference held in San Francisco. In 2015, the museum opened in Stockton's Little Manila.

== See also ==
- Manilatown
- Overseas Filipino
- Filipino American History Month
- Filipinos of American descent
