= Jean Saint Malo =

Spanish slave

Jean Saint Malo in French (died June 19, 1784), also known as Juan San Maló in Spanish, was the leader of a group of runaway enslaved Africans, known as Maroons, in Spanish Louisiana.

Saint Malo and his band escaped to a marshy area near Lake Borgne, with weapons obtained from free people of color and plantation slaves. The maroons lived in the swamps east of New Orleans and made their headquarters at Bas du Fleuve, located along Lake Borgne in present-day St. Bernard Parish.

The Spanish colonial authorities led a campaign to suppress slave revolts and eliminate Maroon colonies in the region, capturing more than a hundred escaped slaves. In 1783, Col. Francisco Bouligny led an expedition against Bas du Fleuve, capturing 60 people, including Saint Malo.

Jean Saint Malo was condemned to death by hanging, on charges of murder. The execution was carried out by the alcalde Francisco Maria de Reggio on June 19, 1784, in front of St. Louis Cathedral next to the present-day Jackson Square in New Orleans.

The Filipino community of Saint Malo, Louisiana, was named after him.

== See also ==
- List of slaves
