= Filipino American History Month =

Celebration of Filipino American history

- Official name: Filipino American History Month
- Observed by: United States
- Type: Secular, heritage, cultural, ethnic
- Significance: Celebration of Filipino American history
- Begins: 1 October
- Ends: 31 October
- Duration: 1 month
- Frequency: Annual
- Related to: Filipino-American Friendship Day; Asian Pacific American Heritage Month

Filipino American History Month (FAHM) is celebrated in the United States during the month of October. In 1991, Filipino American National Historical Society (FANHS) board of trustees proposed the first annual Filipino American History Month to commence in October 1992.

October was chosen to commemorate the arrival of the first Filipinos who landed in what is now Morro Bay, California on October 18, 1587. It is also the birth month of Filipino American labor leader Larry Itliong.

In California and Hawaii, where many Filipino Americans reside, Filipino American History Month is celebrated annually. Many Filipino American organizations in these states often initiate their own independent celebrations. 2006 was a pivotal year as it marked the centennial celebration of Filipino migration to the United States.

While some used the term Filipino American Heritage Month interchangeably with Filipino American History Month, FANHS cites that the month should be properly focused on "history" instead of "heritage." Whereas history includes the events, experiences, and lives of people and their impact on society, "heritage" is solely about cultural traditions handed down from the past.

== Arkansas ==
In 2022, Filipino American History Month was recognized in Arkansas after official proclamations were issued by Governor Asa Hutchinson.

== California ==
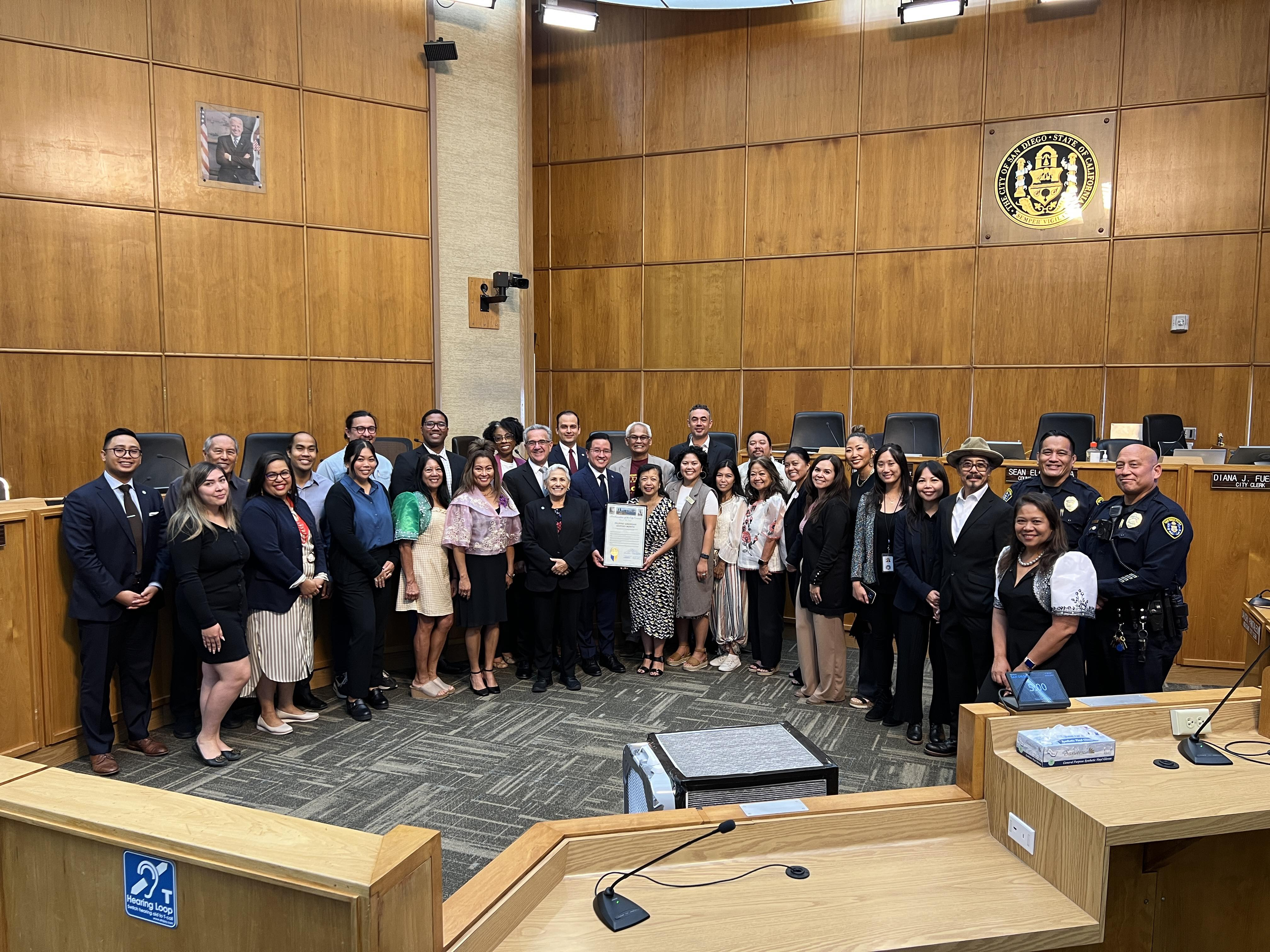
Filipino Americans with City of San Diego Council Members after a city council meeting in October 2023.

In California, Filipino American History Month was first recognized statewide in 2006, when the California Department of Education placed it on its celebrations calendar. In 2009, California State Senator Leland Yee introduced a resolution, which was passed, that recognizes October as Filipino American History Month. It passed the California State Assembly and was submitted to the California Secretary of State.

== Hawai'i ==
In 2008, Filipino-American History Month was recognized by the Hawai'i State Legislature. Former State Representative Joey Manahan and members of the Filipino Caucus introduced the legislation "to designate the month of October as Filipino-American History Month to commemorate the contributions of Filipino-Americans to Hawaii and the United States." The bill passed unanimously and was signed into law by Governor Linda Lingle on April 15, 2008.

== Nevada ==
A 2023 proclamation issued by Governor Joe Lombardo recognized Filipino American History Month in Nevada.

== Nationally ==
In the 103rd Congress, a resolution to nationally recognize Filipino American History Month was introduced. The House of the 111th Congress introduced a House Resolution 155 (H. RES. 155) to officially recognize this month for Filipinos. In October 2009, the Senate of the 111th Congress passed a resolution recognizing Filipino American History Month. In November 2009, Congress passed the resolution (H. RES. 780), officially recognizing October as Filipino American History Month.

== See also ==
- Asian Pacific American Heritage Month
- History of Filipino Americans
