= 1st Filipino Infantry Regiment =

Former United States Army infantry regiment

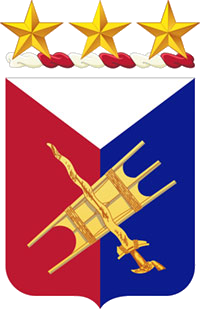
- Regiment Coat of Arms
- Active: 4 March 1942 – 10 April 1946
- Disbanded: 1952
- Allegiance: United States
- Branch: United States Army
- Type: Infantry
- Size: Regiment
- Motto: "Laging Una" (Always First)
- March: "On to Bataan"
- Engagements: World War II: New Guinea campaign; Philippines Campaign (1944–45); Battle of Leyte; Battle of Luzon; Battle of Bataan; Battle of Corregidor; Battle of the Visayas; Samar
- Decorations: Philippine Presidential Unit Citation

- Campaign streamers: New Guinea; Leyte; Southern Philippines

Commanders
- Regiment Commander: Colonel Robert H. Offley; Colonel William Robert Hamby

Insignia
- Shoulder Sleeve Insignia

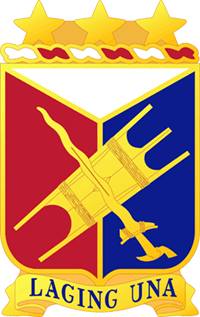
- Distinctive Unit Insignia

The 1st Filipino Infantry Regiment was a segregated United States Army infantry regiment made up of Filipino Americans from the continental United States and a few veterans of the Battle of the Philippines that saw combat during World War II. It was formed and activated at Camp San Luis Obispo, California, under the auspices of the California National Guard. Originally created as a battalion, it was declared a regiment on 13 July 1942. Deployed initially to New Guinea in 1944, it became a source of manpower for special forces and units that would serve in occupied territories. In 1945, it deployed to the Philippines, where it first saw combat as a unit. After major combat operations, it remained in the Philippines until it returned to California and was deactivated in 1946 at Camp Stoneman.

== Background ==
In 1898, the Philippines was ceded by Spain to the United States and, after a conflict between Philippine independence forces and the United States, Filipinos were allowed to immigrate freely to the United States as U.S. nationals. Most immigrants chose to settle in the Territory of Hawaii and the West coast. In 1934, U.S. policy changed, and their status as nationals was revoked.

In 1941, the Imperial Japanese Navy attacked Pearl Harbor, while other Japanese forces attacked the Philippines. Filipino Americans, like other Americans, attempted to volunteer for military service, but were not allowed to enlist since they were neither citizens nor resident aliens. Following a change in legislation it was announced on 3 January 1942, the day after Manila fell, that Filipinos would be permitted to volunteer, and could be drafted, for military service; in California, almost half of the male Filipino American population enlisted. Some who volunteered to serve were refused due to their age; other older volunteers were refused due to the need for agricultural labor. Filipinos were strongly encouraged to volunteer for the Regiment, and only those who did so were assigned to it. Those who did not volunteer to serve in the Regiment served in regular (white) units in various theaters of operation. One example was PFC Ramon S. Subejano, who was awarded the Silver Star for actions in Germany.

== History ==
=== Stateside ===
Constituted in March 1942, the 1st Filipino Infantry Battalion was activated in April at Camp San Luis Obispo, to liberate the Philippines. Colonel Robert Offley was selected as the unit's commanding officer, as he spoke Tagalog and had spent time on Mindoro in his youth. During the following months, Filipino Americans continued to volunteer, and the unit grew. Philippine Army personnel who were in the United States and Filipino military personnel who had escaped the fall of the Philippines and were recuperating in the United States were also instructed to report to the unit. On 13 July 1942, the battalion was elevated to a regiment at the California Rodeo Grounds in Salinas, California. The Regiment was made up of three battalions, each consisting of a headquarters company and four infantry companies. The Regiment had a separate regimental headquarters company, a service company, an anti-tank company, a medical detachment, and a band. Members of this regiment were notably issued bolo knives.

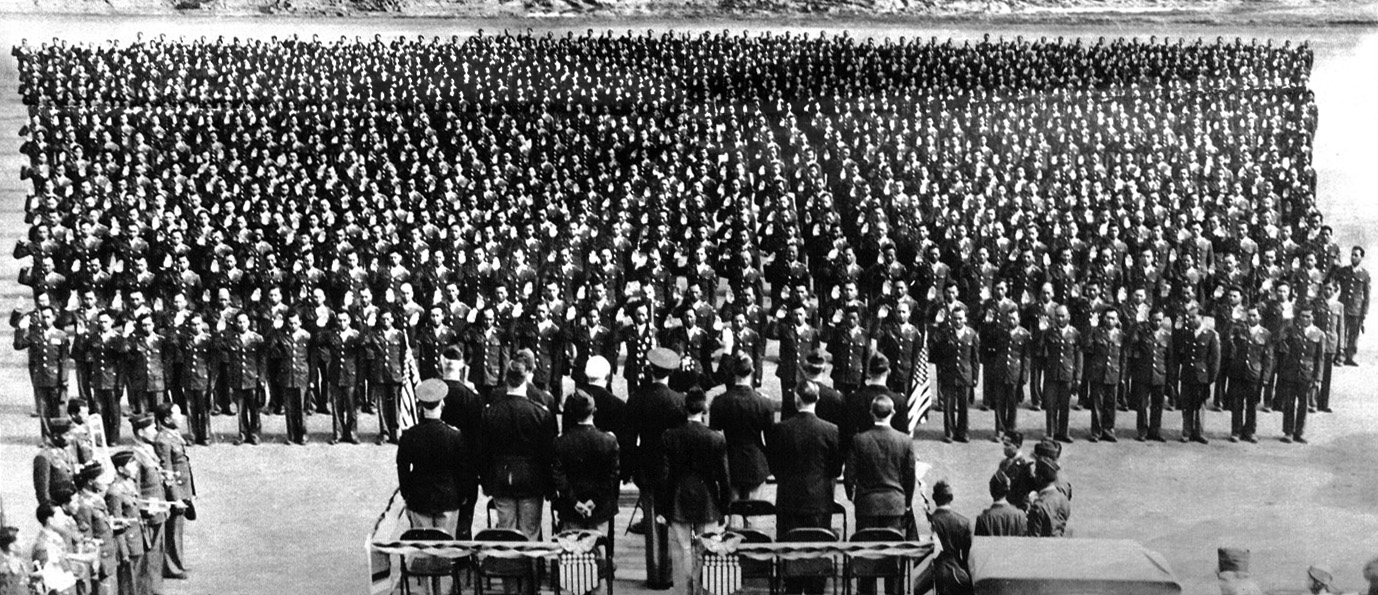
Naturalization ceremony at Camp Beale on 20 February 1943

The Regiment continued to train and grow, leading to the activation of the 2nd Filipino Infantry Regiment at Fort Ord in November 1942. The 2nd Regiment was assigned to Camp Cooke and the 1st to Camp Beale. Eventually, more than 7,000 soldiers would be assigned to the Filipino Infantry Regiments. While at Camp Beale, there was a mass naturalization ceremony of 1,200 soldiers of the Regiment. As members of the armed forces they were able to become citizens; in 1924 naturalization of Filipino Americans had been barred, as it was determined that only aliens could be naturalized and Filipinos at the time were nationals. In November 1943, it paraded through Los Angeles, with Carlos Bulosan, the influential Filipino author of America Is in the Heart, there to witness it.

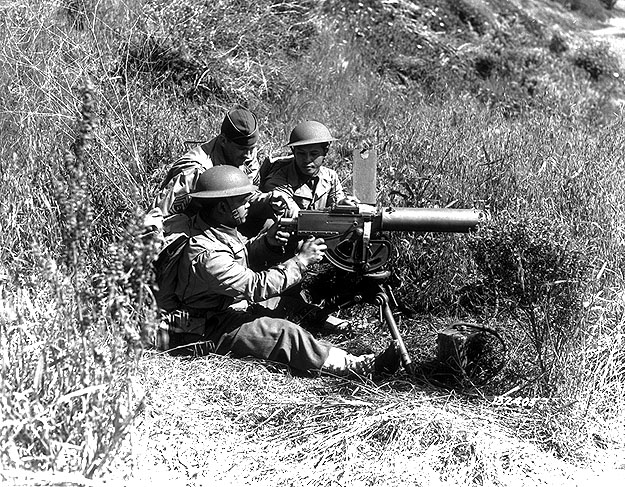
Soldiers of the Regiment training on a machine gun in 1943.

Members of the Regiment faced discrimination during this period. The anti-miscegenation laws in California meant that the soldiers were banned from marrying non-Filipino women; those soldiers who wished to marry in this way were transported to Gallup, New Mexico, as New Mexico had repealed its anti-miscegenation law after the Civil War. Soldiers of the Regiment faced discrimination in Marysville while visiting from neighboring Camp Beale, as the local businesses refused to serve Filipinos. This was later remedied by the Regiment's commander, who informed the Chamber of Commerce that they were failing to cooperate with the Army, at which point they changed their business practices. Further instances of discrimination against soldiers of the Regiment were also reported in Sacramento and San Francisco, where they were mistaken for Japanese Americans.

=== Deployment ===
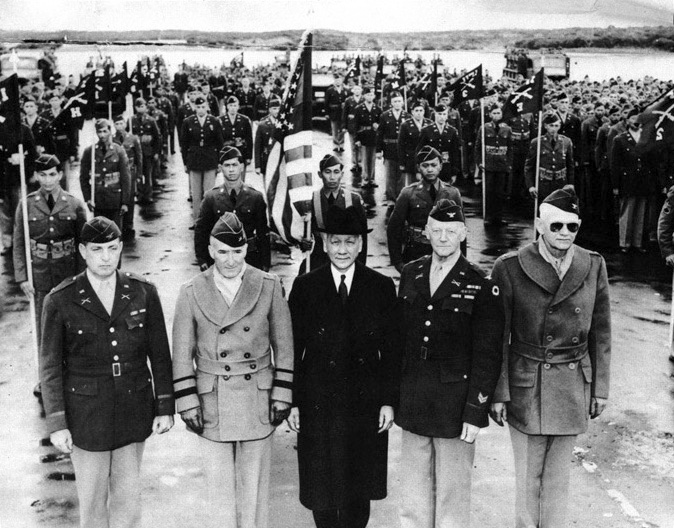
Formation of the Regiment during the visit of Commonwealth Vice President Osmeña

In April 1944, the Regiment departed California aboard the USS General John Pope for Oro Bay, New Guinea. On the way to New Guinea, the Regiment spent part of June in Australia. Upon arriving at Oro Bay, it was assigned to the 31st Infantry Division, 8th Army to provide area security and continue training. Some soldiers were then assigned to the Alamo Scouts, the 5217th Reconnaissance Battalion, and to the Philippine Regional Section of Allied Intelligence Bureau. One example was Second Lieutenant Rafael Ileto, a future Vice Chief of Staff in the Philippines, who led a team in the Alamo Scouts. Due to the reassignment of these soldiers, both Filipino Infantry Regiments became smaller than authorized. In response, the 2nd Filipino Infantry Regiment was disbanded and used to bring the 1st Filipino Infantry Regiment to 125% of its standard allocated size. The remaining soldiers of the 2nd Filipino Infantry Regiment who did not join the Regiment formed the 2nd Filipino Infantry Battalion (Separate). During its time at Oro Bay, the Regiment was reinforced with Filipinos from Hawaii. These men had not been able to enlist in the Army until 1943 as the Hawaiian Sugar Planters' Association had successfully argued that their labor was needed in the sugar industry.

In February 1945, the Regiment was sent to Leyte and was assigned to the Americal Division, 10th Corps. It would later be reassigned back to the 8th Army, in May 1945, along with the Americal Division. Finally, in the Philippines, it conducted "mopping up" operations on Leyte, Samar, and other islands in the Visayan islands group. In addition, some of the companies of the Regiment provided security for 8th Army General Headquarters, Far East Air Force, two airstrips at Tanauan and Tacloban, and Seventh Fleet Headquarters. Other soldiers would also participate in the Luzon Campaign, fighting on the Bataan Peninsula, and the recapture of former Fort Mills; the Regiment was not awarded formal campaign participation for these individual actions.

=== Post-combat ===
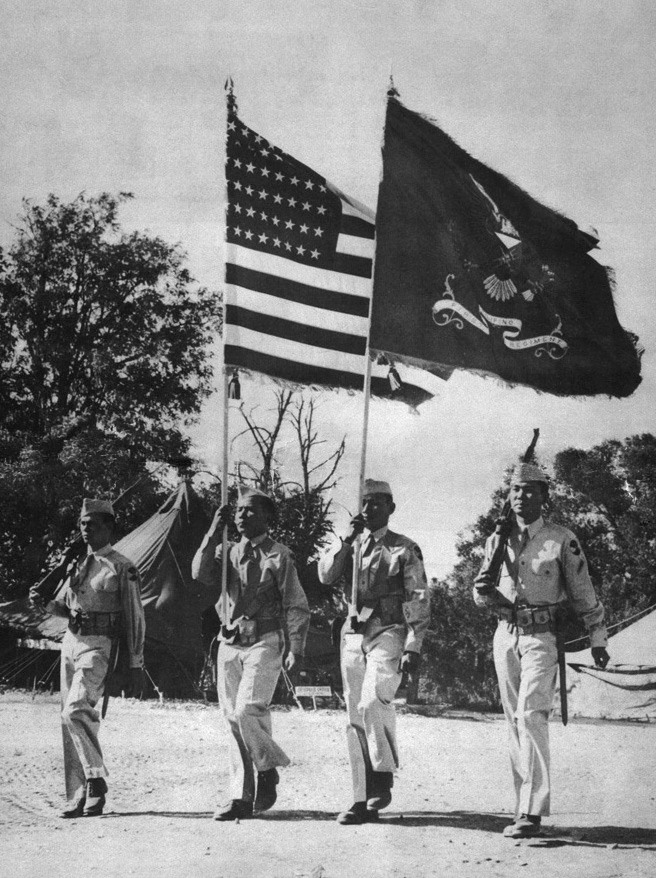
Color guard of the Regiment

By August 1945, operations came to a close due to the Japanese Emperor's decision to end the war following the bombings of Hiroshima and Nagasaki. Soldiers of the Regiment who had been detached to the Alamo Scouts, 5217th Reconnaissance Battalion, and other units were reassigned back to it. During the period between the close of operations and their return to the United States, and without the Imperial Japanese Army to fight, the men of the Regiment clashed with soldiers of the Philippine Commonwealth Army and Philippine Constabulary over differences in pay, culture and local women. Others married women under the War Brides Act, which allowed spouses and adopted children of United States military personnel to enter the U.S. For these newly married couples, a "tent city" was established by Colonel William Hamby, who had succeeded Offley as the Regiment Commander. Many younger soldiers connected to a culture to which they had previously only had a distant relationship, learning language and customs that were not used or practiced in the United States.

Soldiers of the regiment who chose to remain in the Philippines and those who did not qualify to return to the U.S., either due to having an insufficient Adjusted Service Rating Score or were otherwise ineligible were transferred to 2nd Filipino Infantry Battalion (Separate) in Quezon City. Returning to the United States aboard the USS General Calan on 8 April 1946, the rest of the Regiment was sent to Camp Stoneman, near Pittsburgh, California, where it was deactivated on 10 April 1946.

== Legacy ==
During the war the efforts of Filipino and American defenders during the Battle of Bataan were widely covered by the press, as were the actions of the 100th and 442nd Infantry. After the war, the efforts of the 442nd continued to be lauded, with the 1951 film Go for Broke! portraying their endeavors. By contrast, the activities of the Filipino Infantry Regiment and her sister units were largely unpublicized; it was not until the documentaries Unsung Heroes and An UnTold Triumph that any significant visual media covered the history of the Regiment. In 1984 an association of veterans of the Regiment erected a marker in Salinas in honor of their former unit.

The War Brides Act of 1945, and subsequent Alien Fiancées and Fiancés Act of 1946, continued to apply until the end of 1953, allowing veterans of the Regiment, and other Filipino American veterans, to return to the Philippines to bring back fiancées, wives, and children. In the years following the war, some sixteen thousand Filipinas entered the United States as war brides. These new Filipino American families formed a second generation of Filipino Americans, significantly expanding the Filipino American community.
