= Sakadas =

Migrant farm workers from the Philippines

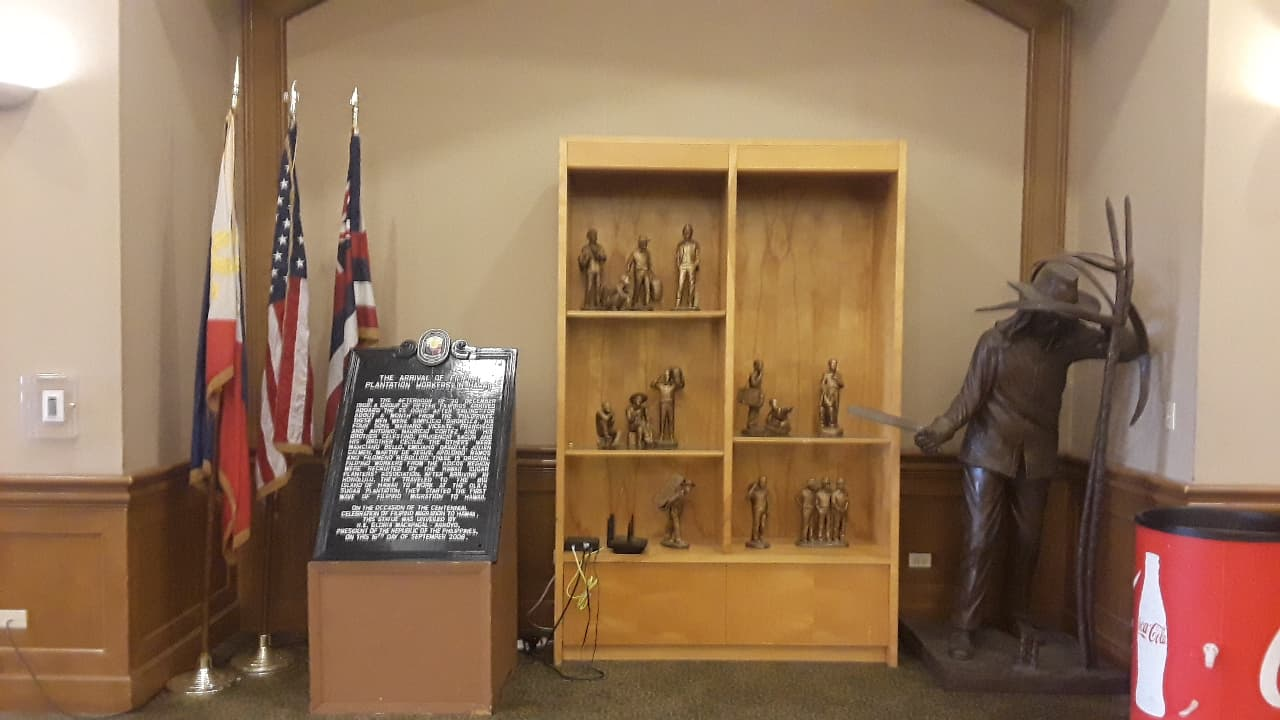
Display area containing the NHCP historical marker for the Filipino Sakadas and a sculpture representing them.

Sakadas (Spanish: sacadas; Kinaray-a: manga sakada; Ilocano: dagiti sakada; Hiligaynon: mga sakada; roughly "imported ones") is a term for migrant workers in and from the Philippines, doing manual agricultural labor. Within the Philippines, sakadas work in provinces other than their own. In the 20th century, Filipino men were imported by the Hawaiian Sugar Planters' Association to Hawaii as "skilled laborers" from 1906 to 1946 mainly from the Ilocos region of the Philippines.

== History ==
The Hawaiian Sugar Planters' Association approved a plan to recruit labor from the Philippines in April 1906 and asked Albert F. Judd to represent them. The first Filipino farm laborers in Hawaii arrived on December 20, 1906 from Candon, Ilocos Sur, aboard the SS Doric (1883).

== See also ==
- Hacienda
- Carlos Bulosan
- History of Filipino Americans
- Manong generation
- Negrense
- Nicholas Loney
