= Manila Village =

- Former settlement
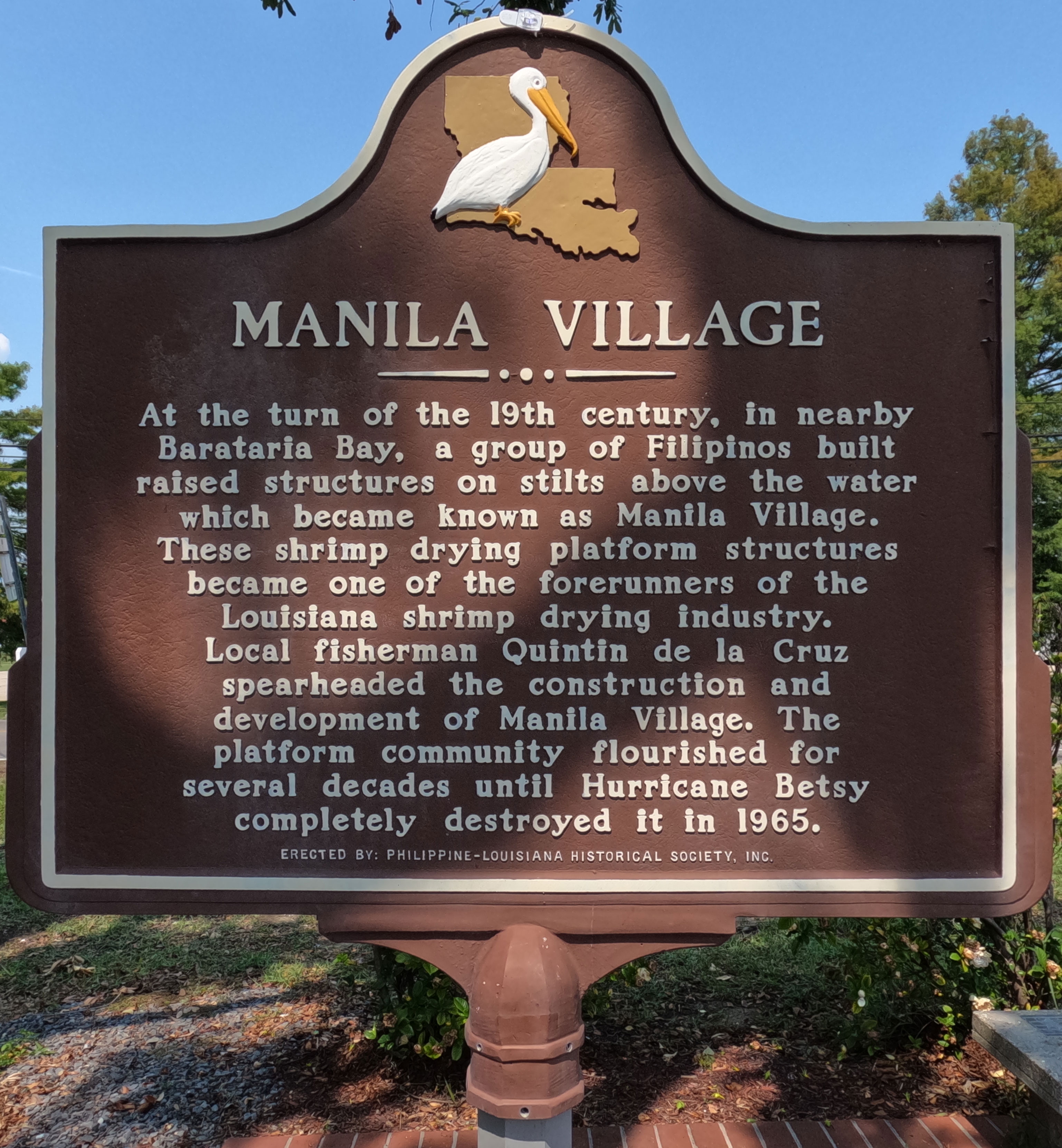
- Manila Village Historical Marker

- Location within Louisiana Location within the United States
- Coordinates: 29°25′42″N 89°58′35″W
- Country: United States
- State: Louisiana
- Parish: Jefferson Parish
- Time zone: Central (CST)
  - Summer (DST): CDT

Manila Village (locally spelt Manilla; Cajun French: Cloque-Chênière, Cloche-Chênière, or Cabanage) was a settlement of Filipino sailors, fishermen and laborers located on an island in Barataria Bay, in Jefferson Parish, Louisiana, United States. The settlements of Saint Malo in St. Bernard Parish was occupied by Filipino sailors who had jumped ship from their Spanish captains, near New Orleans in the year 1763. In later years, other Filipino countrymen arriving in port at Louisiana would also escape Spanish galleons. This group would later found the Manila Village settlement in the mid-19th century (or earlier). The newly liberated sailors became fishermen who caught and dried shrimp for export to Asia, Canada, South America, and Central America. On July 24, 1870, the Spanish-speaking residents of St. Malo founded the first Filipino social club, called Sociedad de Beneficencia de los Hispano Filipinos, to provide relief and support for the group's members, including the purchasing of burial places for their deceased. In 1938, the community had a population of 200 people, mostly Filipinos, but also Chinese, Mexicans, and Spaniards.

The settlements were eventually destroyed by hurricanes: Saint Malo by the 1915 New Orleans hurricane; Manila Village by Hurricane Betsy in 1965. Descendents of the village continue to fish and shrimp in southern Louisiana. In 2015, the only remains of the structures of "Manilla Village" are wood pilings that are visible above the water's surface. By 2016, only a small remnant of Manila island, about one acre in size, remained. By 2021, the island stopped being visible during high tide. By 2024, it is no longer visible during low tide.

In Jefferson Parish, Manila Plaza, located in front of Jean Lafitte Town Hall, holds several historical markers and commemorative plaques acknowledging important figures in the area's Filipino American history. While there were several settlements scattered along the Louisiana coast in the late 19th century, Manila Village was the largest.

== See also ==
- Dried shrimp
- Jean Lafitte, Louisiana § History
- Saint Malo, Louisiana
