= Ramon S. Subejano =

Decorated Filipino-American World War II veteran

Ramon Simpas Subejano
- Subejano in 1971
- Born: 1905; New Lucena, Iloilo, Philippine Islands, US
- Died: September 16, 1988 (aged 82–83); New York City, United States
- Burial place: Arlington National Cemetery
- Military career
- Allegiance: United States of America
- Branch: United States Army
- Service years: 1942–1948
- Rank: Private First Class
- Units: 358th Infantry Regiment, 90th Infantry Division
- Conflicts: World War II; *Normandy; *Northern France; *Rhineland; *Ardennes-Alsace
- Awards: Silver Star Purple Heart (with 3 Oak Leaf Clusters) European-African-Middle Eastern Campaign Medal (with 4 service stars) World War II Victory Medal

Ramon Simpas Subejano (1905 – September 16, 1988) was a highly-decorated Filipino-American soldier who served in the European theatre of World War II.

== Biography ==
Leaving the Philippines as a stowaway in 1927, he eventually became a merchant marine. Later purchasing a pool hall with casino winnings, he lost it during the Great Depression, then worked as a busboy until he was drafted in 1942.

=== World War II ===
Pvt. Ramon S. Subejano served with Company A, 358th Infantry Regiment, 90th Infantry Division and saw combat at Normandy Beach, Ardennes, Northern France, the Netherlands, and the Rhineland. He was a scout sniper and was wounded several times. During the course of the war he earned 17 medals, credited for killing more than 400 Germans in battle. During one battle he was the sole survivor of his unit.

One of the medals was the Silver Star which cited him for "Gallantry in action on December 7, 1944 in the vicinity of Dillengen, Germany." The citation continued, "At the risk of his life, Pvt. Subejano made his way along through devastating 20 mm and machine gun fire and hand grenade explosions to the building. He then entered the strong point and going from room to room, killed five enemy, wounded six and forced the remaining 37 to surrender. At the end of the war he was flown to London for the victory parade, where he was presented to King George and Sir Winston Churchill.

=== Post-World War II ===
Pvt. Ramon S. Subejano was featured in the front page of The New York Times on May 31, 1952 during the city's observance of Memorial Day. His picture appeared in the "A Salute To War Dead From A Decorated Hero" wearing his full dress army uniform complete with medals and ribbons he earned in the European and Pacific theaters rendering a salute in front of the Soldiers' and Sailors' Monument (New York). According to The New York Times, he was an unscheduled addition to the Memorial Day program when he came as a spectator in uniform with his chest full of medals and ribbons, "hobbled up the monument steps using a cane and was introduced at the speaker's stand to the crowd" He would later meet Marilyn Monroe, Senator Kennedy, and President Kennedy.

At one point his medals were stolen from his apartment; with the assistance of Senator Kennedy's office, the Department of Defense presented replacements of all his medals. In 1987, while living in the neighborhood of Brighton in the city of Boston, he was charged threatening to harm his apartment manager. Less than a year later he would die in a Veteran Affairs Hospital in New York City. Subejano is buried at Arlington National Cemetery. His story is in the Library of Congress, "One Man Army" (1978).
