= Saint Malo, Louisiana =

Saint Malo San Maló
- Ghost town
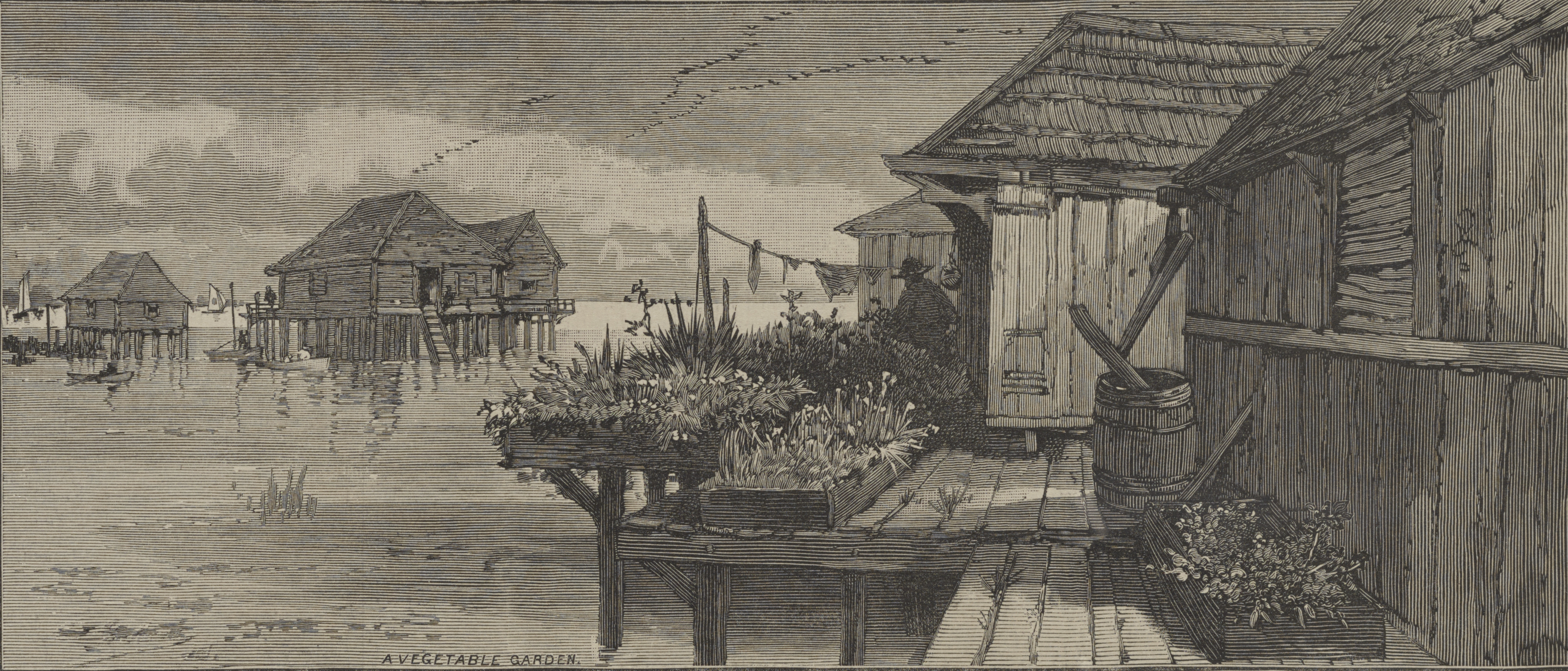
- The settlement as it appeared in Harper's Weekly, 1883.

- Location within Louisiana Location within the United States
- Coordinates: 29°52′41″N 89°35′49″W
- Country: United States
- State: Louisiana
- Parish: St. Bernard Parish
- Establishment: c.1763
- Destruction: September 29, 1915
- Named for: Juan San Maló
- Time zone: UTC−6 (Central)
  - Summer (DST): UTC−5 (Central)

Saint Malo (Spanish: San Maló [samaˈlo]) was a small fishing village that existed along the shore of Lake Borgne in St. Bernard Parish, Louisiana as early as the mid-eighteenth century until it was destroyed by the 1915 New Orleans hurricane. Located along Bayou Saint Malo, about 6 miles (9.7 km) east of the Isleño fishing village of Shell Beach, it was the first permanent settlement of Filipinos and perhaps the first Asian-American settlement in the United States.

The exact date of the establishment of Saint Malo is disputed. The settlement may have been formed as early as 1763 or 1765 by Filipino deserters of the Spanish Manila galleon trade. The members of the community were commonly referred to as Manila men, or Manilamen, and later Tagalas.

Oral tradition states that the fisherman of Saint Malo witnessed the British invasion of Louisiana leading up to the Battle of New Orleans and joined the Baratarians under Jean Lafitte in the defense of New Orleans.

== History ==
Small communities of criminals, fugitive slaves, and Filipinos commonly found refuge along Lake Borgne in the eighteenth and nineteenth centuries. The settlement of Saint Malo was established, by some accounts, as early as 1763 by Filipinos who deserted Spanish ships during the Manila galleon trade. It is also possible that the community was established later into the early nineteenth century. The Manilamen settled in the marshlands of Louisiana where no Spanish officials could reach them. Reasons for their desertion varied; however their desire to escape brutalities dealt by the Spanish is generally regarded as the main reason.

Beginning in 1784, Juan San Maló (French: Jean Saint Malo) led a group of maroons (Spanish: cimarrones) below New Orleans and in St. Bernard Parish which stole livestock, destroyed property, and seeded other chaos. In May of that year, the Spanish government began preparing for an expedition to capture San Maló and his maroons after a group of Americans were murdered. San Maló retreated with his group to live in the extensive marshland surrounding Lake Borgne, but Spanish forces led by Francisco Bouligny eventually captured him along with sixty maroons. On June 19, 1784, he was hanged in Jackson Square.

The same area that San Maló and his group found refuge became known by his name. It wasn't until March 31, 1883 that the journalist Lafcadio Hearn published an article in Harper's Weekly which documented the community firsthand. The article is the first published article about the Filipinos in the United States.

The 1893 Cheniere Caminada hurricane damaged the community. Saint Malo was completely destroyed, along with much of the region, by the New Orleans hurricane of 1915 and consequently the remnants of the community assimilated into New Orleans.

== Role in the War of 1812 ==
According to oral tradition, the Manilamen of Saint Malo took part in the Battle of New Orleans by joining privateer Jean Lafitte to assist Major General Andrew Jackson. Historian Marina Espina states that the defending American force under Jackson consisted of "regular army troops, state militia, western sharpshooters, two regiments and pirates from the Delta Swamps." However, historian Randy Gonzales alleges that possibly only a single Manilaman fought in the battle, and that a lot of this history is intertwined with local legends and myths.

== Description ==
=== Dwellings ===
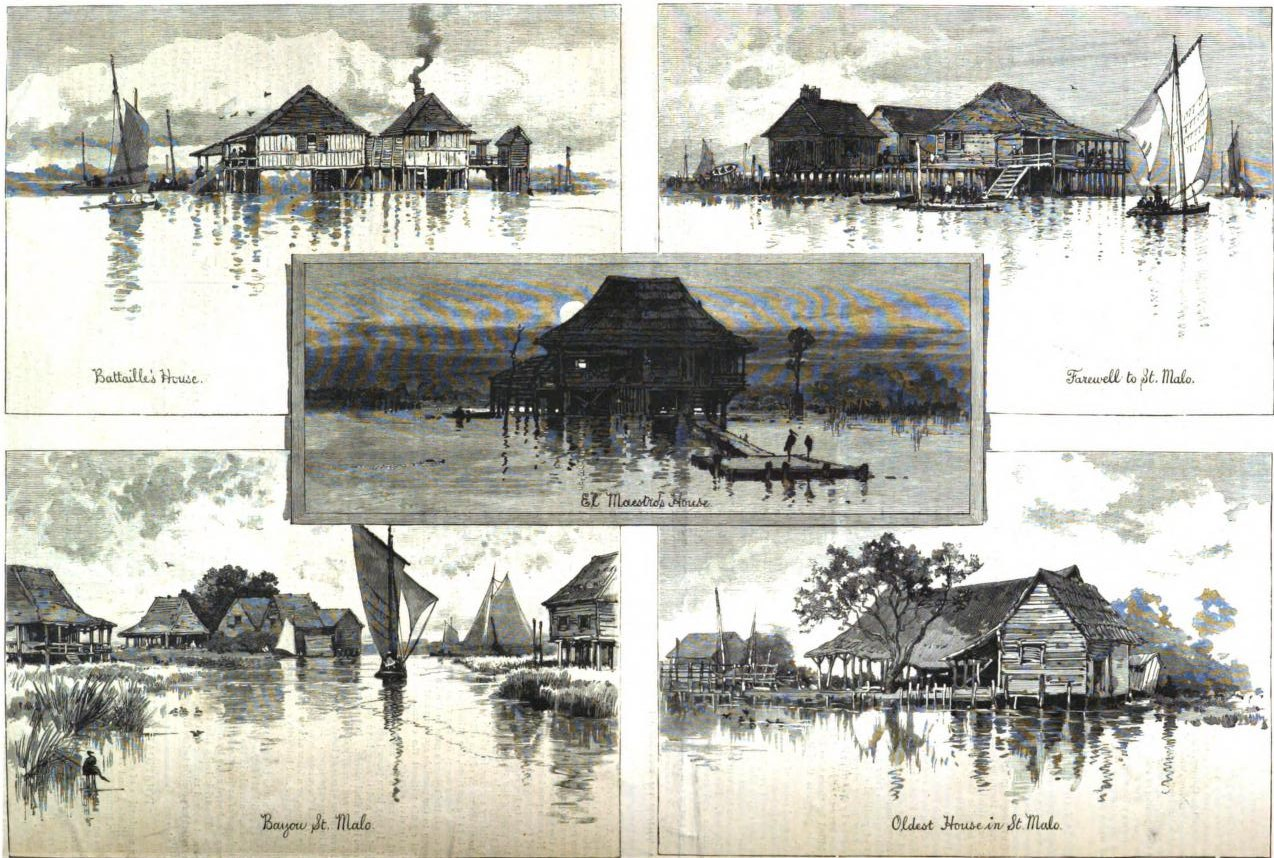
Depictions of the houses and scenery of Saint Malo.

The Manilamen lived in small houses supported above the water by stilts in a similar style to the nipa huts of the Philippines. Wood needed to construct dwellings had to be acquired elsewhere as it could not be easily found in the swamps. The palmetto and woven-cane construction often did not withstand the harsh climate of marsh and had to be repaired or replaced frequently. Windows were draped with netting to protect from mosquitoes and other biting insects. Dwellings lacked furniture including tables, chairs, and bed frames. Mattresses were stuffed with dried Spanish moss which had been a common practice in the region and had even been used to upholster the Ford Model T. The mattresses were laid upon a series of shelves mounted against the walls. According to Hearn, the fishermen slept at night “among barrels of flour and folded sails and smoked fish.”

=== Diet ===
The diet of the community consisted mainly of seafood, principally raw fish with oil and vinegar. Fish was also smoked and hung for later consumption. Chickens and pigs were raised among the dwellings, and depictions illustrated small gardens along the walkways and porches.

=== Family ===
The Manilamen of Saint Malo lived a subsistence lifestyle based upon fishing and trapping. Rarely did women live in the village. In fact, there were no women in the community during Hearn's visit. If fisherman did have families, they often lived in New Orleans and its environs. The reason for this can be attributed to the isolated and harsh conditions of the settlement. Manilamen often courted and married Isleño, Cajun, and Indigenous women. When it was possible, Manilamen sent profits made from fishing to acquaintances in Manila so that it might be delivered to their families.

=== Government ===
Due to the isolation of Saint Malo, the Manilamen paid no taxes and the community lacked law enforcement officials. The village had never been visited by any official from St. Bernard Parish, the state of Louisiana, or the United States government. As a result, the community governed itself. In extreme cases, the eldest man of the community would consider disputes and mediate the situation. In the rare case that a given verdict was not accepted, the individual was imprisoned in a “fish-car,” which was a makeshift prison cell. The offender generally accepted the terms given to him due to the harsh physical conditions, lack of food, and/or rising tide.

=== Religion ===
The predominant religion of the Manilamen was Roman Catholicism. Priests rarely went to visit the settlement due to its isolation.

== Modern day ==
Some descendants of these Filipinos continue to live in Louisiana today as multiracial Americans. A number of Isleños and their descendants possess Filipino ancestry, so much so that Los Isleños Heritage and Cultural Society of St. Bernard lists "Filipino" as a significant community that developed the Isleño identity.

In November 2019, a historical marker for the settlement was installed at Los Isleños Museum Complex.

== Notable Filipino settlements in Louisiana ==
- Alombro Canal (Plaquemines Parish)
- Camp Dewey (Plaquemines Parish)
- Bayou Cholas (Jefferson Parish)
- Bassa Bassa (Jefferson Parish)
- Leon Rojas (Jefferson Parish)
- Manila Village (Jefferson Parish)

== See also ==
- Filipino Americans
- Jean Lafitte, Louisiana
- Isleños
- List of fishing villages
- Manila galleon
