= 2nd Filipino Infantry Regiment =

- Active: 14 October 1942 – 27 March 1944
- Allegiance: United States
- Branch: United States Army
- Type: Infantry
- Size: Regiment
- Engagements: World War II

Insignia
- Shoulder Sleeve Insignia

The 2nd Filipino Infantry Regiment was an American Army regiment composed of Filipino Americans that was active in the Pacific Theater during World War II. It was constituted at Fort Ord under the 1st Filipino Battalion in October 1942 and was activated the following month until its disbandment and reorganization in March 1944 into the 2nd Filipino Battalion (Separate). It went on to serve in New Guinea and was later stationed in the Philippines. The regiment never saw combat. It was constituted by request of Filipinos.

== History ==
On 21 December 1941, the United States Congress amended the Selective Training and Service Act by passing the Filipino Naturalization Bill to permit enlistment of all citizens and "every other male person residing in the United States" which enabled the recruitment of Filipino-Americans who were previously not able to enlist.

The 1st Filipino Infantry Regiment was formed in July 1942 in response to the desire for an all-Filipino regiment. Its recruitment grew until a 2nd Regiment was needed to be formed to properly organize the manpower. When it was formed in October 1942 it was initially led by Colonel Charles Clifford at Fort Ord. In 1943 the regiment was sent to Camp Cooke for several months of training. The regiment stayed at the Hunter Liggett Military Reservation during October 1943. There they underwent even more extensive combat training until returning to Camp Cooke. In March 1944, the regiment was reorganized to bring the 1st Filipino Regiment up to 125% strength and the 2nd Filipino Battalion (Separate) was formed to take their place. The newly formed 2nd Battalion then experienced a brief one month long stay at Camp Stoneman in June 1944. On 4 July 1944 the unit was sent to Oro Bay in Papua New Guinea. From there it was sent to Manila where it stayed until its disbandment in 1946.
