= Filipino Repatriation Act =

American immigration law in 1935

The Filipino Repatriation Act of 1935, also known as the Welsh Bill after Representative Richard J. Welch, established for Filipino people living in the United States a repatriation program. It provided free transportation for Filipino residents of the continental United States who wished to return to the Philippines but could not afford to do so.

== Provisions ==
The Filipino Repatriation Act provided free one-way transportation for single adults. Such grants were supplemented in some instances by private funds, such as from the California Emergency Relief Association, that paid passage for Filipino children who had been born in the United States so that they could return with their parents. Both the Tydings–McDuffie Act and the Filipino Repatriation Act halted family reunification under U.S. immigration law, forcing many Filipino families to remain separate for a number of years. If they wished to return to the US, the Filipinos were restricted under the quota system established by the Tydings–McDuffie Act which limited the number of Filipinos entering the US to 50 per year.

== History ==
Along with Guam and Puerto Rico, the United States acquired the Philippines from Spain following the Spanish–American War in 1898 and it became United States territory. The Jones Act of 1916 made it official policy to grant Philippines independence and the Tydings–McDuffie Act of 1934 laid out the timeline and process by which that would happen, with independence fully recognized in ten years. Filipino immigration to the mainland United States started soon after the Philippines became a territory.

During the late 19th and early 20th centuries, many Asians and Asian Americans faced discrimination within the United States. Though United States nationals, but not United States citizens. Filipinos were not exempt from this nativist sentiment, particularly on the West Coast of the United States. Federal and state legislation and other policies that placed limits on Asian American economic and social lives were applied to Filipinos. The Repatriation Act served as a way to encourage Filipinos to return to the Philippines voluntarily without officially deporting them, and a way for policy makers to act towards domestic sentiment without an international incident.

The program was largely unsuccessful and transferred fewer than 2,200 Filipinos back to the Philippines, at a time when there were over 45,000 Filipinos reported in the 1930 census in the mainland United States. In the October 3, 1938 issue of Time, an article entitled "Philippine Flop" reported that 1,900 Filipinos had returned to the Philippines. This failure has often been attributed to the fact that if any Filipino wished to return to the US during the tenure of this program then they would be facing an uphill battle against a quota of only 50 Filipinos allowed into the US per year.

This act was deemed unconstitutional by the United States Supreme Court in 1940 after 2,190 Filipinos had returned to the Philippines. It was succeeded by the Nationality Act of 1940.

== See also ==
- History of the Philippines (1898–1946)
