= Demographics of Filipino Americans =

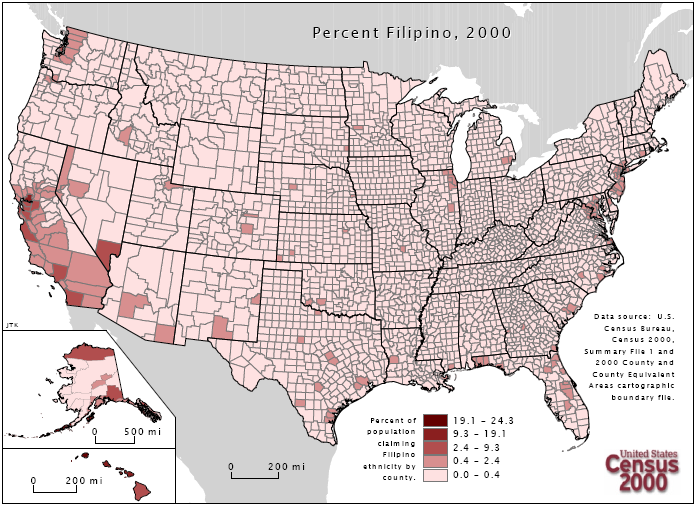
Map depicting Filipinos in the United States, according to the 2000 census

The demographics of Filipino Americans describe a heterogeneous group of people in the United States who trace their ancestry to the Philippines. As of the 2020 census, there were 4.4 million Filipino Americans, including Multiracial Americans who were part-Filipino living in the US. Filipino Americans constitute the third-largest population of Asian Americans, and the largest population of Overseas Filipinos.

The first recorded presence of Filipinos in what is now the United States dates to October 1587, with the first permanent settlement of Filipinos in present-day Louisiana in 1763. Migration of significant numbers of Filipinos to the United States did not occur until the early 20th century, when the Philippines was an overseas territory of the United States. After World War II, and until 1965, migration of Filipinos to the United States was reduced limited to primarily military and medically connected immigration. Since 1965, due to changes in immigration policy, the population of Filipino Americans has expanded significantly.

Filipino Americans can be found throughout the United States, especially in the Western United States and metropolitan areas. As a population, Filipino Americans are multilingual, with Tagalog being the largest non-English language spoken. A majority of Filipino Americans are Christian, with smaller populations having other religious views. On average, Filipino Americans earn a higher household income and achieve a higher level of education than the national average.

== National population demographics ==
Historical population
| Year | Pop. | ±% |
|---|---|---|
| 1910 | 160 | — |
| 1920 | 5,603 | +3401.9% |
| 1930 | 45,208 | +706.9% |
| 1940 | 45,563 | +0.8% |
| 1950 | 61,636 | +35.3% |
| 1960 | 176,310 | +186.1% |
| 1970 | 343,060 | +94.6% |
| 1980 | 774,652 | +125.8% |
| 1990 | 1,406,770 | +81.6% |
| 2000 | 2,364,815 | +68.1% |
| 2010 | 3,416,840 | +44.5% |
| 2020 | 4,436,992 | +29.9% |
2000, 2010, and 2020 figures include Multiracial Filipino Americans; Source: _{Table 4}

Due to the significant increase of Indian Americans, Filipino Americans became the third-largest Asian American ethnicity in the United States. Filipino Americans who only listed Filipino alone, increased their population by 20.4% to 3,076,108, being the third largest Asian alone ethnicities behind Indian Americans, and Chinese Americans. When including multiracial Asian Americans, the total population of Filipino Americans increased by 29.9% to 4,436,992 persons, behind Chinese Americans and Indian Americans. According to the 2023 American Community Survey about two thirds of Filipino Americans were not multiracial, and under half are immigrants (47%).

The Filipino American community was the second-largest Asian American group in the United States with a population of over 3.4 million as of the 2010 US census, making up 19.7% of Asian Americans. Only Chinese Americans had a larger population among Asian Americans in 2014. Not including multiracial Filipino Americans, the population of those responding as Filipino alone in the 2010 census was 2,555,923, an increase of 38% in population from the 2000 census. 69% of Filipino Americans were born outside of the United States. 77% of all Filipino Americans are United States citizens. Filipino Americans are the largest subgroup of Overseas Filipinos; as of 2011, there are 1,813,597 Philippines-born immigrants living in the United States (4.5% of all immigrants in the United States), of which 65% had become naturalized US citizens. In 2014, there was an estimated 1.23 million second generation Filipino Americans, who had a median age of 20, yet three percent were over the age of 64. Life expectancy for Filipino Americans is higher than the general population of the United States; however, survival rates of Filipino Americans diagnosed with cancer are lower than European Americans and African Americans. In 2015, the United States Census Bureau's American Community Survey estimated that there were over 3.8 million Filipinos in the United States. In 2018, the American Community Survey estimated the population of Filipinos in the United States to be over 4 million. In 2019, the American Community Survey estimated the population of Filipinos in the United States to be about 4.2 Million.

The US Census Bureau reported that the 2007 American Community Survey, identified approximately 3.1 million persons as "Filipino alone or in any combination". The census also found that about 80% of the Filipino American community are United States citizens. According to a study published in 2007, 11% of single-heritage Filipinos did not mark "Asian" as their race; this number was greater among multiracial Filipinos. Also in 2011, the U.S. State Department estimated the size of the Filipino American community at four million, or 1.5% of the United States population. There are no official records of Filipinos who hold dual citizenship; however, during the 2000 census data indicated that Filipino Americans had the lowest percentage of non-citizens amongst Asian Americans, at 26%. Additionally, although historically there had been a larger number of Filipino American men than women, women represented 54% of the Filipino American adult population in the 2000 Census.

Filipino Americans are the largest group of Overseas Filipinos, and the majority were born outside of the United States; at the same time, more than 73% are United States citizens. Among Asian Americans, Filipino Americans are the most integrated in American society, and are described by University of California, Santa Barbara Professor Pei-te Lien as being "acculturated and economically incorporated". One in five is a multiracial American. Multiple languages are spoken by Filipino Americans, and the majority are Roman Catholic. A U.S. Census Bureau survey done in 2004 found that Filipino Americans had the second highest median family income amongst Asian Americans, and had a high level of educational achievement.

Interracial marriage among Filipinos is common. They have the largest number of interracial marriages among Asian immigrant groups in California; only Japanese Americans have a higher rate nationally. Compared to other Asian Americans, Filipino Americans are more likely to have a Hispanic spouse. Statistically, Filipino American women are more likely to marry outside of their ethnicity (38.9%) than Filipino American men (17.6%). Between 2008 and 2010, 48% of Filipino American marriages were with non-Asians. It is also noted that 21.8% of Filipino Americans are multiracial, second among Asian Americans. Depending on their parentage, multiracial Filipino Americans may refer to themselves as Mestizo, Tsinoy, Blackapino, and Mexipino.

== Historical settlement ==
=== Early immigration ===
The earliest recorded presence of Filipinos in what is now the United States is October 1587 when mariners under Spanish command landed in Morro Bay, California. The earliest permanent Filipino American residents arrived in the Americans in 1763, settling in Louisiana's bayou country. They later created settlements in the Mississippi River Delta such as Saint Malo and Manila Village. They were documented by Harper's Weekly journalist Lafcadio Hearn in 1883. These settlements were the first longstanding Asian American settlements in the United States. The last of these, Manila Village, survived until 1965 when it was destroyed by Hurricane Betsy. An additional 2,000 were documented in New Orleans with their roots dating back to about 1806— the first being Augustin Feliciano from the Philippines's Bicol Region. Others came later from: Manila, Cavite, Ilocos, Camarines, Zamboanga, Zambales, Leyte, Samar, Antique, Bulacan, Bohol, Cagayan, and Surigao.

=== American period ===
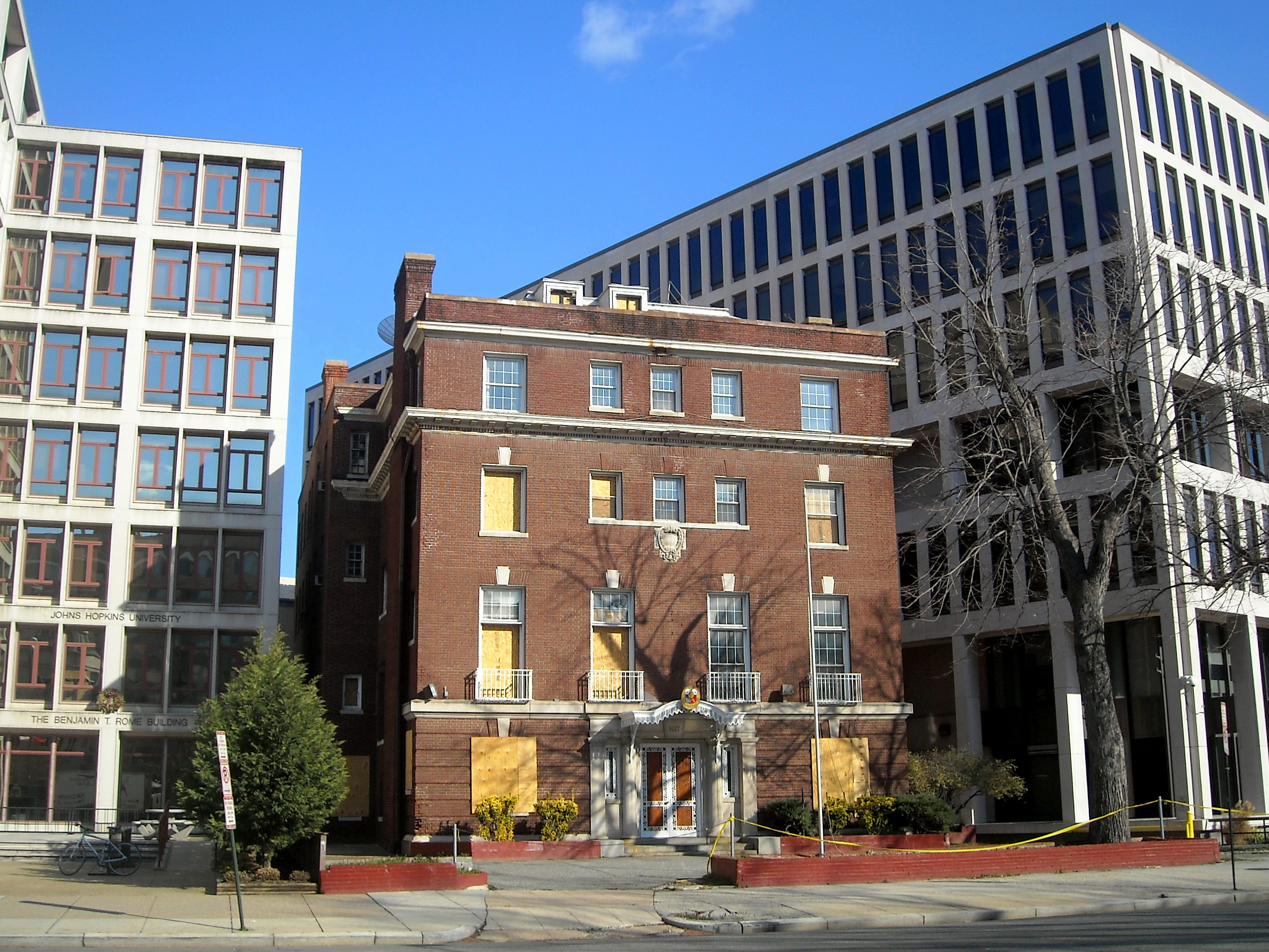
Headquarters of the government in exile and temporary capital of the Commonwealth of the Philippines

Significant immigration to the United States began in the 1900s after the Spanish–American War when the Philippines became an overseas territory of the United States, and the population became United States nationals. Unlike other Asians who were unable to immigrate to the United States because of the immigration laws of the time, Filipinos, as U.S. nationals, were exempt. In December 1915, it was ruled that Filipinos were eligible for naturalization and could become citizens. Naturalization remained difficult, however, with documented cases of denied naturalization and de-naturalization occurring in the early 20th century. Filipinos, many agricultural laborers, settled primarily in the then Territory of Hawaii and California. Of the one hundred thirteen thousand Filipinos who immigrated during the early American period, about a third returned to the Philippines.

A smaller group of immigrants were sent on a scholarship program established by the Philippine Commission, and were collectively known as "pensionados"; the first batch of pensionados was sent in 1903 and the scholarship program continued until World War II. The students were chosen initially from wealthy and elite Filipino families, but were later from a more diverse background. Other Filipino students, outside the program, came to the United States for education; many did not return to the Philippines.

During this wave of migration to the United States from the Philippines, men outnumbered women by a ratio of about 15:1. Nuclear families were rare, therefore, and an indication of privilege. This migration, known as the "manong generation", was reduced to 50 persons a year after passage of the Tydings–McDuffie Act (officially the Philippine Independence Act) which classified Filipinos as aliens. This was offset by the United States Navy's recruitment of Filipinos, that began in 1898 and authorized by President William McKinley in 1901. They were exempt from this quota. Additionally, those Filipino sailors were eligible for naturalization after three years of service. By 1922, Filipinos made up 5.7% of the United States Navy's enlisted personnel. In 1930, there were twenty-five thousand Filipino Americans in the United States Navy, primarily rated as stewards, having largely displaced African-Americans in that rating.

=== Post-independence ===
The War Brides Act of 1945, and subsequent Alien Fiancées and Fiancés Act of 1946, allowed veterans to return to the Philippines to bring back fiancées, wives, and children. Some sixteen thousand Filipinas entered the United States as war brides, and a lone Filipino groom immigrated during this period. These new immigrants formed a second generation of Filipino Americans that grew Filipino American communities, providing nuclear families. Immigration levels were impacted by the independence of the Philippines from the United States, that occurred on 4 July 1946. The quota of non-naval immigration increased slightly to 100 because of the passage of the Luce–Celler Act of 1946. Thus, Filipino American communities developed around United States Navy bases, whose impact can still be seen today. Filipino American communities were also settled near Army and Air Force bases. After World War II, until 1965, half of all Filipino immigrants to the United States were wives of U.S. servicemembers. In 1946, the Filipino Naturalization Act allowed for naturalization, and citizenship for Filipinos who had arrived before March 1943. Beginning in 1948, due to the U.S. Education Exchange Act, Filipino nurses began to immigrate to the United States; 7,000 arrived that year.

=== Post-1965 ===
Following the enactment of the Immigration and Nationality Act of 1965, until at least the 1990s, the Philippines became the largest source of Asian immigration, providing one-fourth of Asian immigrants to the United States. Filipinos were the largest number of Asians immigrants to the U.S. and the second-largest immigrant population after Mexicans. Into the 1990s, Filipino immigrants included many highly educated and higher skilled immigrants. A significant portion of them worked in the medical field filling medical personnel shortages in the U.S. in areas like nursing. As a result of the shortage of nurses, the Philippines become the largest source of healthcare professionals who immigrated to the U.S. In the 1960s, nurses from the Philippines became the largest group of nurses immigrating to the U.S. surpassing those immigrating from Canada. By the 1970s, 9,158 Filipino nurses had immigrated to the U.S., making up 60% of its immigrant nurses. By 2000, one in ten Filipino Americans, or an estimated 100,000 immigrants, were employed as nurses. in 2020, the estimate of Filipino American nurses increased to over 150,000, or 4% of the all nurses in the United States. In 2020, 7% of those employed in the medical field were Filipino American. Another result of the Immigration and Nationality Act of 1965 was that family reunification based immigration added to the total number of Filipino immigrants resulting in two distinct economic groups within the Filipino American community.

Like other immigrant groups, Filipino immigrants clustered together both out of a sense of community and in response to prejudice against them. This created the first Little Manilas in urban areas. As time passed, immigration policies changed, and prejudice diminished, leading to a decline in the presence of Little Manilas. Between 1965 and 1985, more than 400,000 Filipinos immigrated to the United States. In 1970, immigrants made up more than half (53%) of all Filipino Americans. In 1980, Filipino Americans were the largest group of Asian Americans in the entire US. Half a million of the Filipino American population were immigrants, making up 3.6% of all immigrants in the U.S. outnumbering United States-born Filipino Americans two to one. In the 1980s, 1990s, and 2000s more than half a million Filipinos obtained legal permanent resident status in the U.S. during each decade. In 1992, the U.S. Navy ended the Philippines Enlistment Program because of the end of the 1947 Military Bases Agreement. It had allowed about thirty-five thousand Filipinos to join the U.S. Navy, many of whom immigrated to the U.S. (Note: The last of the 1992 Filipino recruits of the United States Navy retired in 2022.) Filipino Americans tended to settle in major metropolitan areas, and in the West in a more dispersed fashion. They also intermarried more than other Asian Americans.

== Population concentrations ==
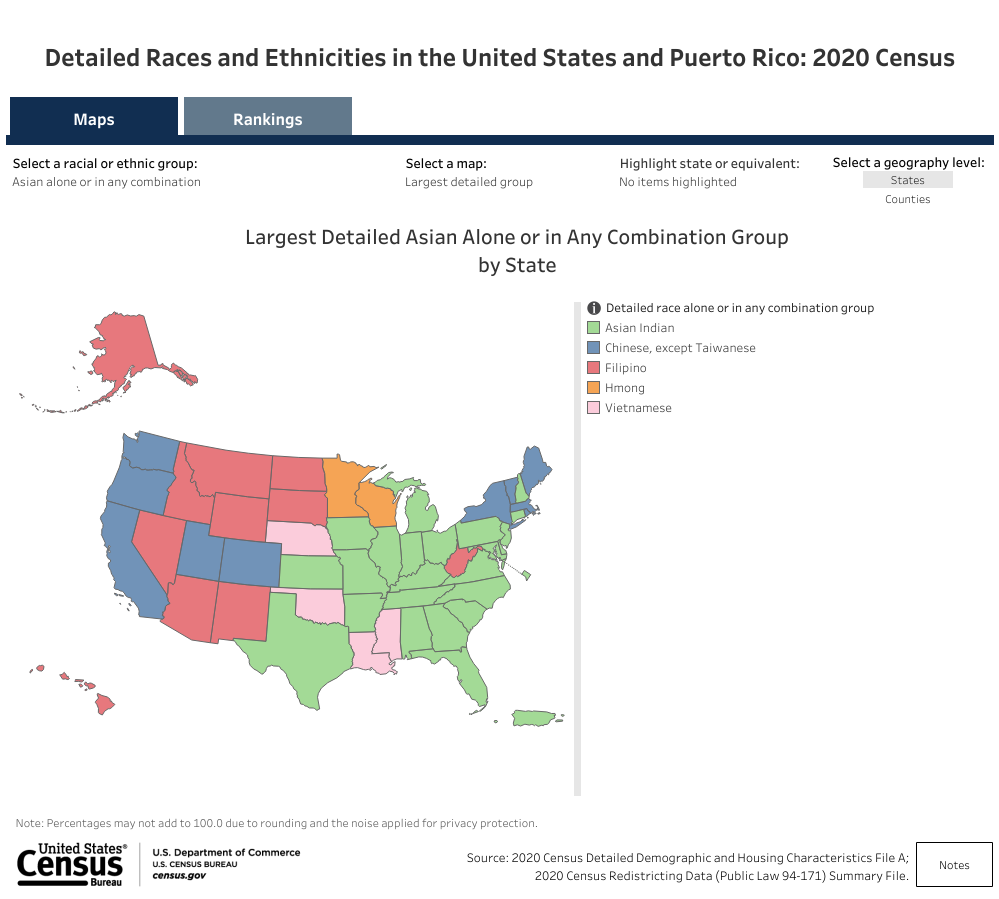
2020 Census largest Asian American ethnicities by State

As of the 2020 Census, Filipino Americans were the largest population of Asian Americans in 11 states (Alaska, Arizona, Hawaii, Idaho, Montana, Nevada, New Mexico, North Dakota, South Dakota, West Virginia, and Wyoming), and the second largest population of Asian Americans in 15 states (Arkansas, California, Colorado, Florida, Illinois, Kentucky, Louisiana, Maine, Mississippi, Oklahoma, Oregon, South Carolina, Utah, Virginia, and Washington).

The following is a list of states with Filipino American populations of over 70,000 in 2017.

| States | Filipino alone or in any combination |
|---|---|
| California | 1,651,933 |
| Hawaii | 367,364 |
| Texas | 194,427 |
| Washington | 178,300 |
| Nevada | 169,462 |
| Illinois | 159,385 |
| New York | 144,436 |
| Florida | 143,481 |
| New Jersey | 129,514 |
| Virginia | 108,128 |
| Maryland | 71,858 |
| Arizona | 70,333 |
| United States | 4,037,564 |

In 2010, Filipino Americans were the largest group of Asian Americans in 10 of the 13 western states: Alaska, Arizona, California, Hawaii, Idaho, Montana, Nevada, New Mexico, Washington, Wyoming; Filipino Americans are also the largest group of Asian Americans in South Dakota. Filipino immigrants have dispersed across the United States, gravitating toward economic and professional opportunities, independent of geographic location. Among the 1,814,000 Philippines-born Filipino Americans, the states with the largest concentrations are California (44.8%), Hawaii (6.2%), New Jersey (4.8%), Texas (4.8%), and Illinois (4.7%)._{Table 4.} In 2008, 35% of Filipino immigrants in the United States lived in the Los Angeles, San Francisco, and New York City metropolitan areas; by 2011, the percentage of the total Filipino immigrant population in the U.S. in those metropolitan areas was 33%. In 2010, Filipino Americans constituted the largest Asian American group within five of the nation's twenty largest metropolitan areas: San Diego, Riverside, Las Vegas, Sacramento, and Houston.

=== California ===
Although Filipinos first arrived in California in the 16th century, the first documentation of a Filipino residing in California did not occur until 1781, when Antonio Miranda Rodriguez was counted in the census as a "chino". During the California Gold Rush, about a hundred Filipinos were present in Mariposa County. In 1910, there were only five Filipinos in California; ten years later, in 1920, 2,674 Filipinos lived there. In 1930, there were about 35,000 Filipino agricultural laborers in California's Central Valley where the majority of Filipinos in the United States resided. That year, Filipinos were as few as 7% of the agricultural workforce in the Imperial and Coachella valleys, and as much as 18% in the Central Coast and Sacramento Valley. Filipino laborers tended to have better working conditions and earn more than their Mexican or Japanese counterparts; in addition, they were described as "dandies and sharp dressers".

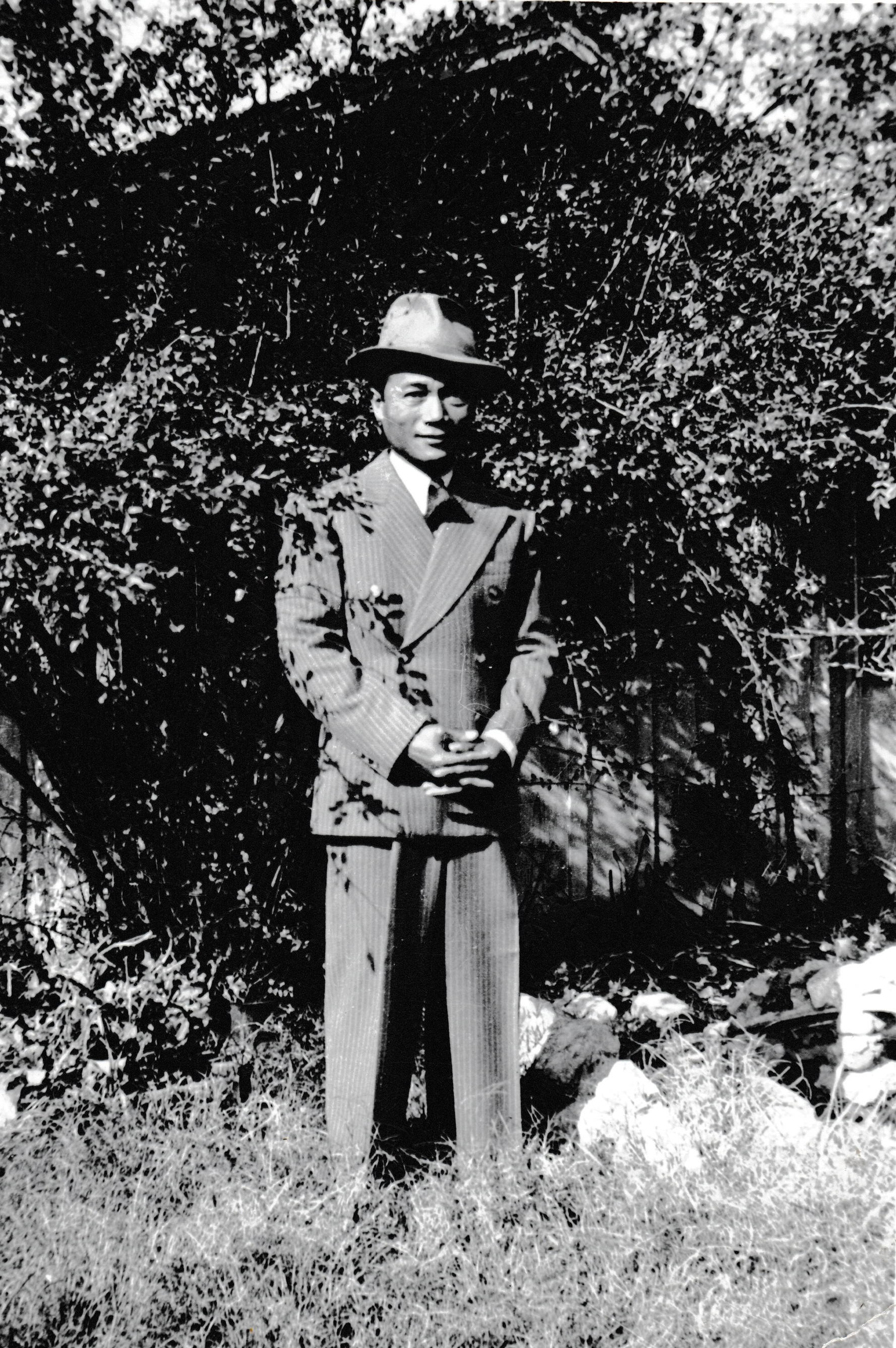
Marshall Tuason, a Filipino immigrant to California, in 1941

Before World War II, Stockton had the largest population of Filipinos outside of the Philippine Islands, and during the harvest season, its Filipino population would swell to over 10,000. During the Great Depression Filipinos in California were the target of race riots, including the Watsonville riots. By the end of World War II, the Filipino population in Stockton increased to over 15,000. In the late 1950s, Filipino Americans in California were concentrated around Stockton, the Bay Area, and Los Angeles with migrant laborers being a significant part of the population. By 1970, the Filipino population in Stockton was less than 5,000, and the once vibrant Filipino community of "Little Manila" had been largely demolished except for a few blocks by 1999, mostly due to construction of the "Crosstown Freeway". A population of Filipinos remains in the Central Valley region in the 21st century, however it is no longer a significant concentration. In 2019, it was estimated that Filipino Americans are the largest populations of Asian Americans in Stockton, and are about 28,000 people.

In 1940, the Filipino population grew to 31,408 and continued to grow to 67,134 by 1960. It had nearly doubled to 135,248 by 1970, and by 1990 had grown to almost three quarters of a million people (733,941). Since at least 1990, Filipino Americans have been the largest group of Asian Pacific Americans in the state. In 1990, more than half (52%) of all Filipino Americans lived in California. In 2000, almost half of all Filipino Americans in the United States lived in California (49.4%), with Los Angeles County and San Diego County having the highest concentrations; additionally in 2000, California was home to nearly half (49%) of Filipino immigrants. In 2008, one out of every four Filipino Americans lived in Southern California, numbering over one million.

The 2010 Census, confirmed that Filipino Americans had grown to become the largest Asian American population in the state totaling 1,474,707 persons; 43% of all Filipino Americans live in California. Of these persons, 1,195,580 were not multiracial Filipino Americans. As of 2011, California is home to 45% of all Filipino immigrants to the United States. In 2013, 22,797 Filipino immigrants seeking lawful permanent residence within the United States sought residence in the state of California, a change from 22,484 in 2012, 20,261 in 2011, and 24,082 in 2010. 20% of California's registered nurses were Filipino in 2013; according to the California Healthcare Foundation, Los Angeles County has the largest concentration of Filipino American nurses, who are 27% of nurses in the county. By 2021, the percentage of nurses in California who are Filipino American dropped down to 18%.

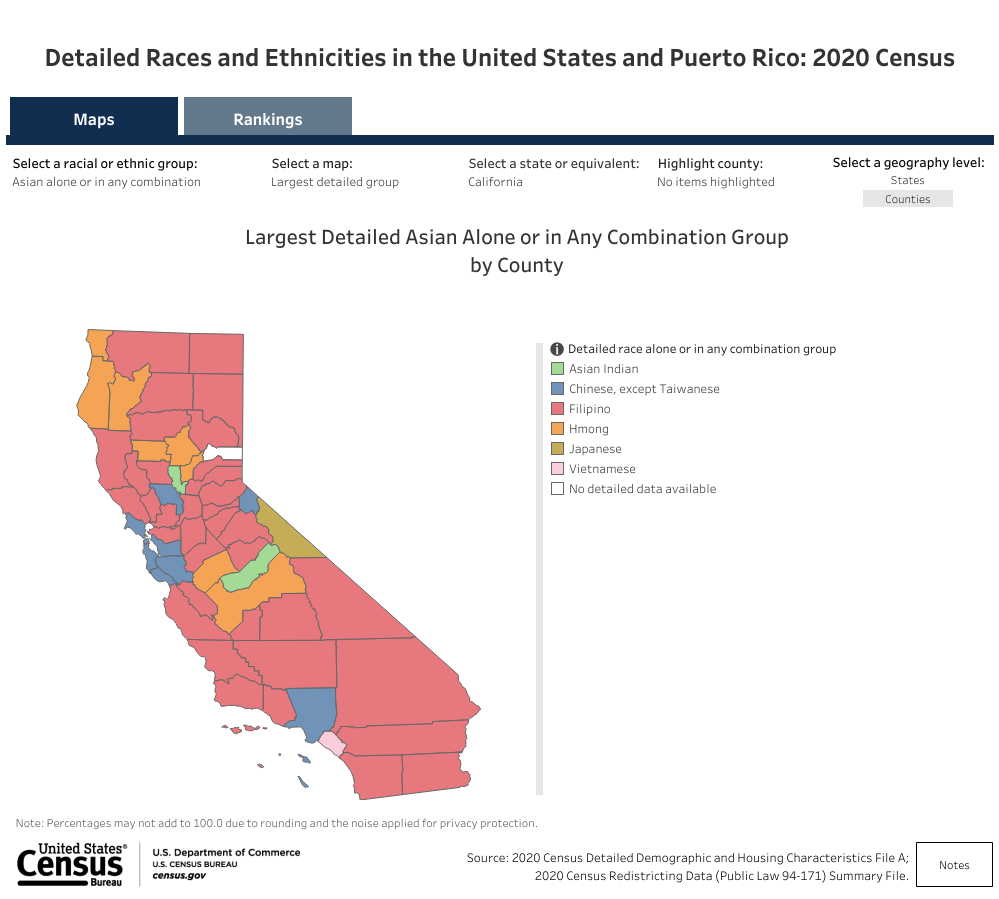
According to the 2020 United States census Filipinos are the largest Asian American populations in the majority of California counties.

By the 2020 Census, the share of Filipino Americans who lived in California decreased to 39.3% of all Filipino Americans living in the United States. Filipino Americans, including multiracial Filipino Americans, were the second largest population of Asian Americans in California, with 1,741,613 Filipino Americans living in the state. Filipino Californians were spread out across the entire state, representing the largest share of Asian Americans in 30 out of California's 58 counties, with a notable majority in most of Southern California (with the exception of greater Los Angeles), Greater Sacramento, and Gold Country.

==== Greater Los Angeles ====
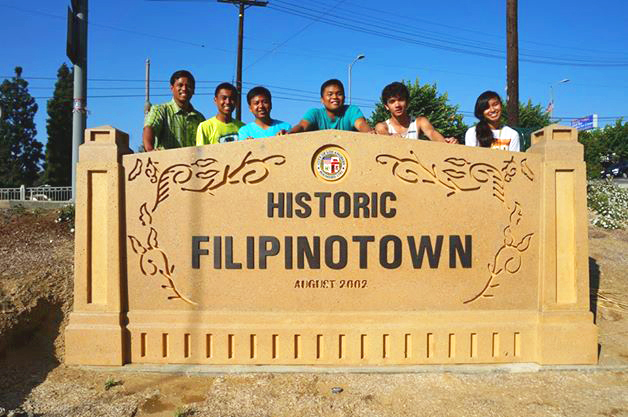
Historic Filipinotown sign.

Filipino pensionados began arriving to the region in 1903, including Ventura County; others attended schools in Los Angeles County, including the University of Southern California, and University of California - Los Angeles. In the 1920s, the area now known as Little Tokyo was known as Little Manila, where the first concentration of Filipino immigrants in Los Angeles lived. In 1930, one in five Filipinos in the United States called Los Angeles County home. The number of Filipinos in the area expanded in the winter season to work temporary jobs. In 1937, the first Filipina American graduated from UCLA. In 1940, there were 4,503 Filipinos living in the City of Los Angeles. Little Manila extended to the Bunker Hill and Civic Center areas of Los Angeles, but was forced to relocate to the Temple-Beverly Corridor in the 1950s and 1960s; it has since been largely forgotten. In the 20th century, Filipino sailors with the United States Navy began to be stationed in Oxnard and Long Beach, developing military related Filipino enclaves; Long Beach community began in the 1940s, the Oxnard community saw significant growth after the 1960s. According to the 1970 United States census, the Los Angeles-Long Beach metropolitan area had the third largest Filipino American population in the United States at that time (32,018). In the 1980s, there were 219,653 Filipinos in Los Angeles County. In 1985, Helen Agcaoili Summers Brown opened the Filipino American Reading Room and Library. In 1990, there were more Filipinos living in suburban Los Angeles (160,778), than in urban Los Angeles (135,336). In 1996 one in four of Asian Americans in Los Angeles was Filipino. In the last two decades of the 20th century Filipinos were the second-largest population of Asian Americans in the region, however one writer described the population as having a "residential invisibility", with other Asian American populations being more visible.

Greater Los Angeles is the metropolitan area home to the most Filipino Americans, with the population numbered around 606,657 in 2010; Los Angeles County alone accounted for over 374,285 Filipinos, the most of any single county in the U.S. The Los Angeles region has the second-largest concentrated population of Filipinos in the world, surpassed only by Manila. Greater Los Angeles is also home to the largest number of Filipino immigrants (16% of the total Filipino immigrant population of the United States), as of 2011. Filipinos are the second-largest group of Asian Americans in the region; however, in 2010, Filipinos were the largest population of Asian Americans within the city of Los Angeles. In 2016, among those surveyed for a report entitled The Color of Wealth in Los Angeles, Filipino Americans had the second-largest proportion of college graduates, with 76.2% having at least a bachelor's degree.

The city of Los Angeles designated a section of Westlake as Historic Filipinotown in 2002. It is now largely populated by Hispanic and Latino Americans. Most Filipinos who resided in the area and the city in general have moved to the suburbs, particularly cities in the San Gabriel Valley, including West Covina and Rowland Heights. Due to West Covina's significant concentration of Filipino Americans, it was proposed a business district be designated a "Little Manila". In 2014, about a quarter of Historic Filipinotown's population was Filipino, however the population did not have a significant "visible cultural impact"; in 2007, Filipinos were 15% of the area's population. Within the city of Los Angeles, Eagle Rock has over 6,000 Filipinos calling the neighborhood home; additionally, as of 2000 the largest source of foreign-born individuals was the Philippines. Panorama City is another Los Angeles neighborhood with a noticeable Filipino population. In 2010, 32.4% of Asians in La Puente were foreign-born Filipino. Other significant concentrations of Filipino Americans in Los Angeles County are in Carson, where "Larry Itliong Day" was dedicated, Cerritos, and Glendale. Orange County also has a sizable and growing Filipino population, whose population grew by 178% in the 1980s; by 2018 the population was estimated to be 89,000. The Inland Empire also has a population of Filipinos, with an estimated 59,000 living in the region in 2003, a hundred years after the first Filipinos arrived in the area to attend Riverside High School; of those about 2,400 lived in Coachella Valley. By the early 2010s estimates were there were around 90,000 Filipinos living in the region—the largest group with Asian ancestry in the area.

As of the 2020 Census, Filipino Americans were the second largest population of Asian Americans, after Chinese Americans, whose 419,187 persons made up 24.7% of all Asian Americans in Los Angeles County. Long Beach has over fourteen thousand Filipino residents; Filipinos are the largest Asian population of Long Beach.

==== San Francisco Bay Area ====
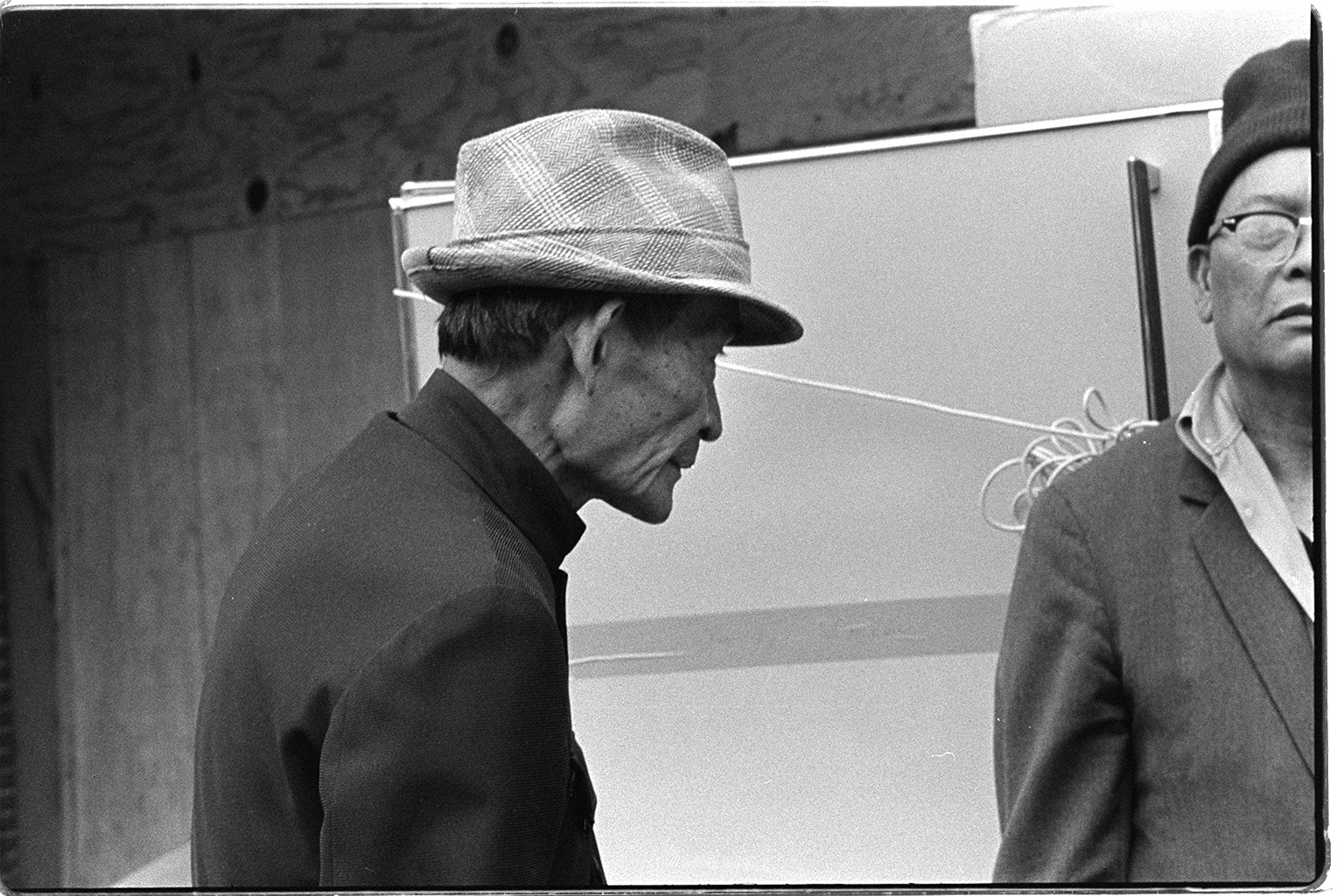
Elderly tenants who were evicted from the International Hotel in San Francisco during the dawn hours of 4 August 1977

One of the earliest records of a Filipino settling in the San Francisco Bay Area occurred in the mid-19th century, when a Filipino immigrant and his Miwok wife settled in Lairds Landing; many Coast Miwok trace their lineage to this couple. Significant migration began in the early 20th century, including upper-class mestizo businessmen, mariners, and students (known as pensionados). Another group of Filipinos who immigrated to the Bay Area was war brides, many of whom married African-American "buffalo soldiers". Other immigrants came through the U.S. Military, some through the Presidio of San Francisco, and others as migrant workers on their way to points inland; many of these Filipinos would settle down permanently in the Bay Area, establishing "Manilatown" on Kearny Street. At its largest, "Manilatown" was home to at least 10,000, the last of whom were evicted in August 1977 from the International Hotel. After 1965, Filipinos from the Philippines began immigrating to San Francisco, concentrating in the South of Market neighbourhood. In 1970, the San Francisco-Oakland metropolitan area had the largest population of Filipinos of any metropolitan area in the continental United States—44,326. Two other nearby metropolitan areas also had a population of Filipinos greater than 5,000 in 1970, San Jose (6,768), and Salinas-Monterey (6,147). Due to a change in the ethnic make up of the Yerba Buena neighborhood, and with the construction of the Dimasalang House in 1979, four street names were changed to honor notable Filipinos. By 1990, 30% of the population in South of Market was Filipino American.

The 2000 Census showed that the greater San Francisco Bay Area was home to approximately 320,000 residents of Filipino descent, with the largest concentration living in Santa Clara County. In the mid-2000s Filipino Americans were between one fifth and one fourth of the total population of Vallejo, having been drawn there by agriculture and Mare Island Naval Shipyard. In 2007, there were about a hundred thousand Filipino Americans living in the East Bay alone. By the time of the 2010 Census the greater San Francisco Bay Area was home to 463,458 Filipino Americans and multiracial Filipino Americans; Santa Clara county continued to have the largest concentration in the area. In 2011, 9% of all Filipino immigrants to the United States reside in the San Francisco metropolitan area, and an additional 3% resided in the San Jose metropolitan area. Daly City, in the San Francisco Bay Area, has the highest concentration of Filipino Americans of any municipality in the U.S.; Filipino Americans comprise 35% of the city's population. In 2016, although the number of Filipinos living within the City of San Francisco has been reduced, a heritage district was designated "SoMa Pilipinas". South San Francisco and San Bruno also have significant Filipino populations.

==== San Diego County ====
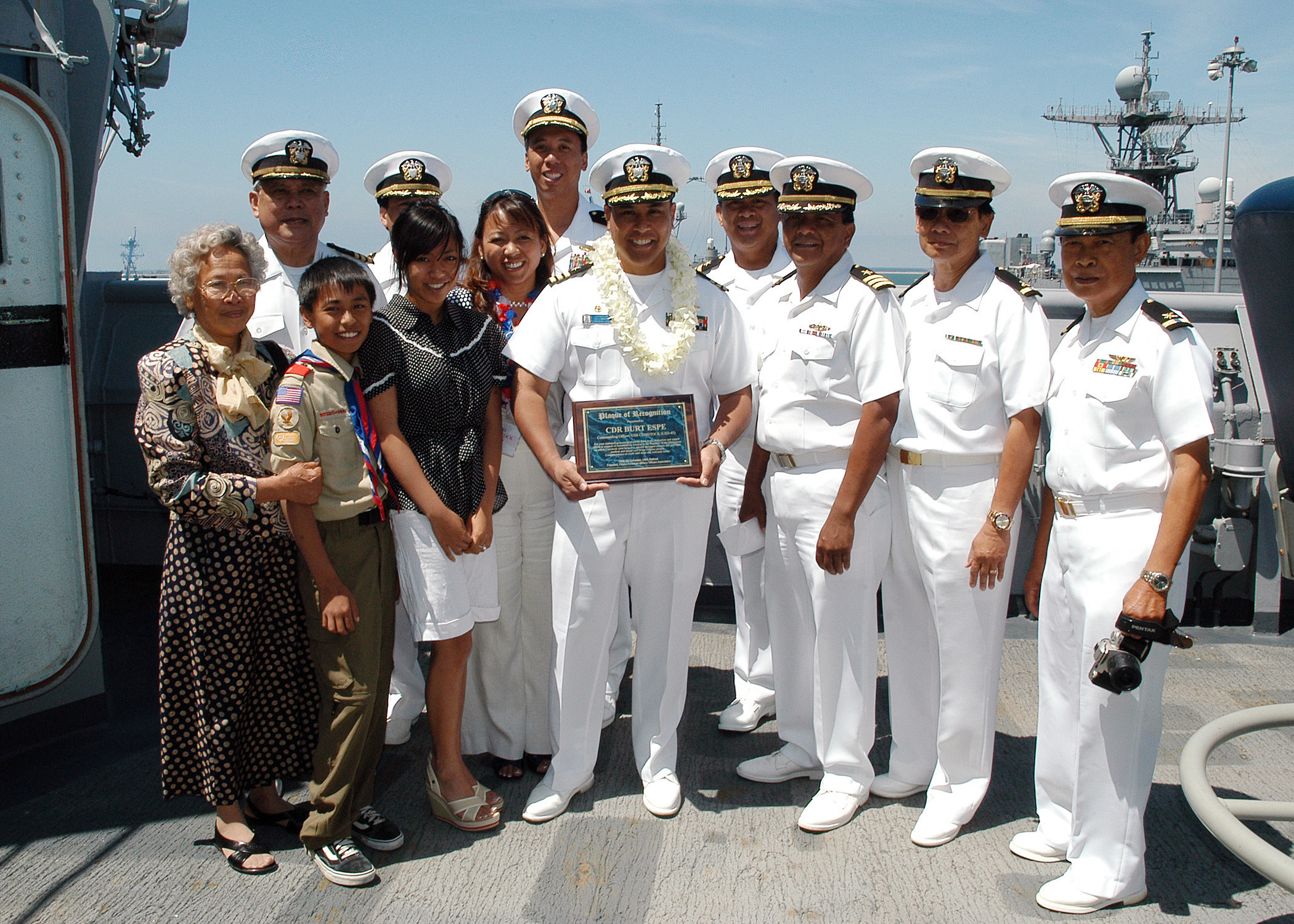
Filipino American U.S. Navy officers and warrant officers aboard the USS Comstock (LSD-45) at Naval Base San Diego.

San Diego has historically been a destination for Filipino immigrants and has contributed to the growth of its population. One of the earliest instances of a Filipino being in San Diego, occurred during the Portolá expedition in 1769, while California was still part of New Spain. The first documentation of Filipinos arriving in San Diego, as part of the United States, occurred in 1903 when Filipino students arrived at State Normal School; they were followed as early as 1908 by Filipino sailors serving in the United States Navy. Due to discriminatory housing policies of the time, the majority of Filipinos in San Diego lived downtown around Market Street, then known as "Skid Row". Prior to World War II, due to anti-miscegenation laws, multi-racial marriages with Hispanic and Latino women were common, particularly with Mexicans. In the 1940s and 1950s, Filipino Americans were the largest population of Asians within the City of San Diego, with a population around 500. After World War II, the majority of Filipino Americans in San Diego were associated with the U.S. Navy in one form or another. Even in the late 1970s and early 1980s more than half of Filipino babies born in the greater San Diego area were born at Balboa Naval Hospital. In the 1970s, the typical Filipino family consisted of a husband whose employment was connected to the military, and a wife who was a nurse. Many Filipino American veterans, after completing active duty, would move out of San Diego, to the suburbs of Chula Vista and National City. In 1995, it was estimated that Filipinos made up between 35% and 45% of the population of National City.

From a population of 799 in 1940, to 15,069 in 1970, by 1990 the Filipino American population in San Diego County increased to 95,945. In 2000, San Diego County had the second-largest Filipino American population of any county in the nation, with over 145,000 Filipinos, alone or in combination; by the 2010 Census the population had grown to 182,248. In 1990 and 2000, San Diego was the only metropolitan area in the U.S. where, at more than fifty percent, Filipinos constituted the largest Asian American nationality. As of 2011, 5% of all Filipino immigrants in the United States call San Diego County home; by 2012, there was an estimated 94,000 Filipino immigrants living in San Diego. Filipinos concentrated in the South Bay, where they had been historically concentrated. In 2015, there were over 31,000 Filipino Americans in Chula Vista alone. Also, in 2015, it was documented that the county had the third largest concentration of Filipino Americans in the entire United States. By late 2016, the population in the county increased to almost 200 thousand. More affluent Filipino Americans moved into the suburbs of North County, particularly Mira Mesa (sometimes referred to as "Manila Mesa"). A portion of California State Route 54 in San Diego is officially named the "Filipino-American Highway", in recognition of the Filipino American community.

As of the 2020 Census, Filipino Americans were the plurality of all Asian Americans living in San Diego County, with their 215,168 people making up 41.6% of all Asian Americans within the county. According to the 2020 United States Census' American Community Survey, 2.8% of the total population of San Diego County spoke Tagalog. According to the 2022 United States Census' American Community Survey, non-Multiracial Filipinos were 4.4% of the total county population, had a median age of 43, had a median individual income of $51,125, 54.7% were male, 60.5% were homeowners, 2.9% were unemployed, 9.4% were military veterans, (Note: Greater than then national average of 6.1%, and 8.8% of non-latino Whites in San Diego County.) 47.5% had completed a bachelor's degree or greater, 12.6% had a disability, 64.3% were immigrants to the United States and of those who immigrated 84.9% were naturalized, 12.2% participated in SNAP, 3.6% lacked health insurance, and cancer was their leading cause of death. In 2025, there were 95,149 Filipinos in San Diego, 36,368 Filipinos in Chula Vista, and 9,456 in National City. While the majority of Filipino American high school students in San Diego County go on to enroll in college, less than half end up earning a college degree. By 2024, National City's Filipino population have dropped down being only a fifth of the city's population.

=== Hawaii ===
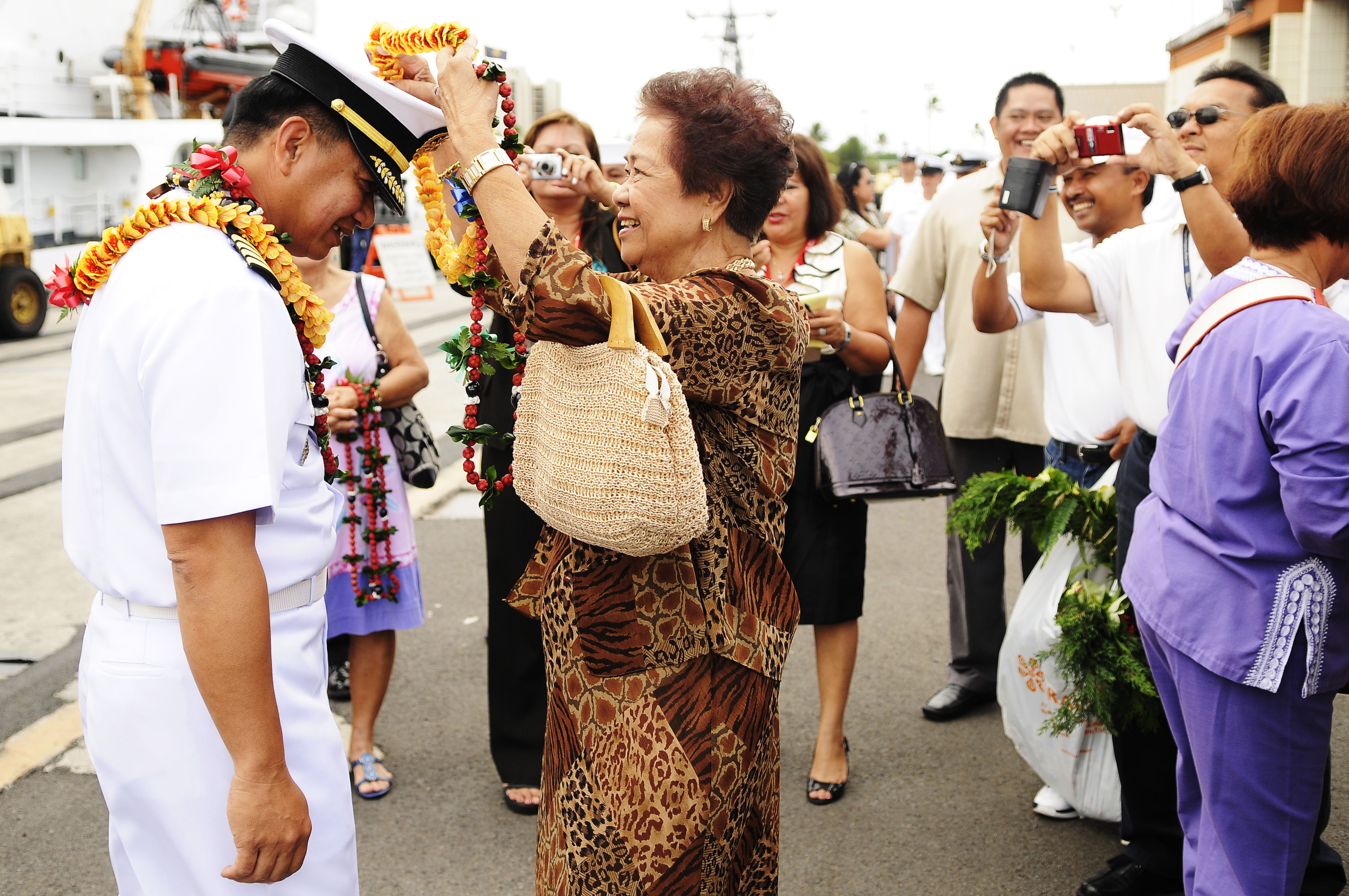
Filipino Americans welcoming the commanding officer of the Philippine Navy's Gregorio del Pilar at Pearl Harbor.

Filipinos had immigrated to the Kingdom of Hawaii in the 19th century; Filipinos were in Hawaii as early as 1853. In 1906, the SS Doric (1883) brought fifteen Filipinos to Hawaii; they were from the Ilocos region. From 1909 to 1934, Hawaiian sugar plantations recruited Filipinos, later known as sakadas; by 1932 Filipinos made up the majority of laborers on Hawaiian sugar plantations. In 1920, Filipinos were the fifth largest population by race in Hawaii, with 21,031 people. By 1930, the population of Filipinos in Hawaii had nearly tripled to 63,052. As late as 1940, the population of Filipinos in the Territory of Hawaii outnumbered Filipinos in the continental United States. In 1950, there were 61,062 Filipinos in Hawaii, increasing to 69,070 in 1960, and 95,353 in 1970. In 1970, the Honolulu metropolitan area alone had a population of 66,653 Filipinos, the largest Filipino population in any metropolitan area in the United States.

According to the 2000 Census, the state of Hawaii had a Filipino population of over 275,000, with over 191,000 living on the island of Oahu; of those, 102,000 were immigrants. Furthermore, Filipinos made up the third largest ethnicity among Asian Pacific Americans, while making up the majority of the populations of Kauaʻi and Maui counties. In June 2002, representatives from the Arroyo Administration and local leaders presided over the grand opening and dedication of the Filipino Community Center in Waipahu. In the 2010 census, Filipino Americans became the largest Asian ethnicity in Hawaii, partially due to the declining population of the state's Japanese Americans. In 2011, four percent of all Filipino immigrants in the U.S. resided in the Honolulu metro area, and were 43% of all immigrants in the Honolulu metro area as well. Filipino immigrants in Hawaii made up six per cent of all Filipino immigrants in the United States.

In 2020, there were 383,200 Filipino Americans in Hawaii. A quarter of the population of Hawaii are Filipino Americans. In 2019 Filipino Americans were the second largest ethnicity in Hawaii, after European Americans. In 2022, Filipino Americans in Hawaii have the second highest median family income ($102,324) of any ethnic group, after Japanese Americans in Hawaii. The Filipino per capita income ($27,738) in Hawaii is lower than the total population median ($36,989). According to Professor Jonathan Okamura of the University of Hawaiʻi at Mānoa, there is no indication of socioeconomic mobility among the subordinate groups like Filipinos, Samoans, Hawaiians, who have been restricted access to opportunities, thereby maintains them subjugated position in low-paying service and other blue-collar jobs that preclude their socioeconomic mobility. The majority of Filipino Americans in Hawaii live in multigenerational households; and nearly a third work in the service industry. During the first year of the COVID-19 pandemic, Filipino Americans were about a fifth of all COVID-19 cases in Hawaii. 2023 Hawaii wildfires on Maui significantly impacted the Filipino American community in Lahaina, where 40% of the community's population before the wildfires were Filipino Americans.

=== Texas ===
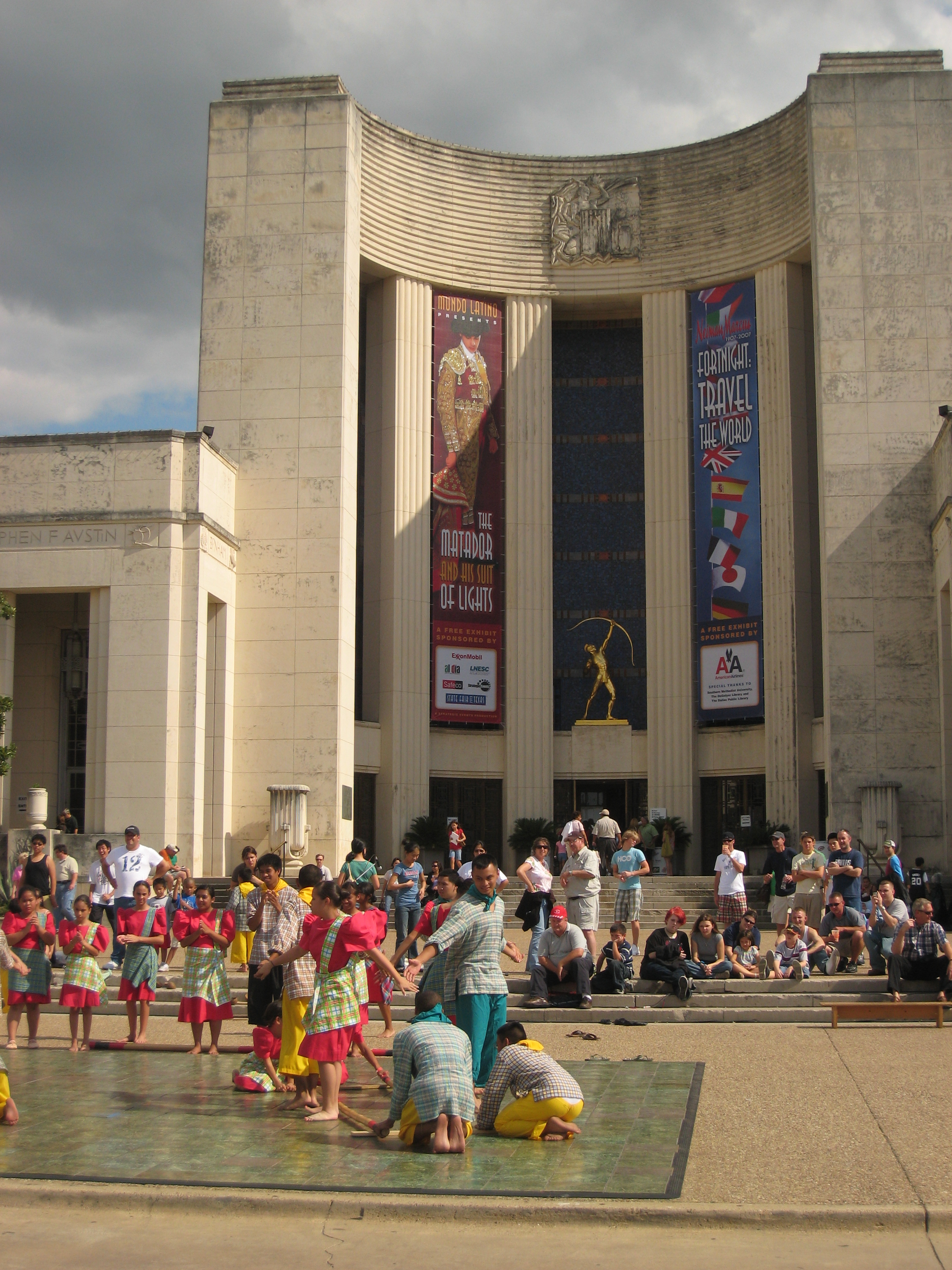
Tinikling dancers at the 2007 Texas State Fair

The first Filipino known by name in Texas was Francisco Flores, who came to Texas by way of Cuba in the nineteenth century. Flores lived initially in Port Isabel later moving to Rockport. Following the annexation of the Philippines by the United States, Filipinos began migrating to Texas. Filipino employees of American officers who served in the Philippines, would move with those officers when they returned to the Continental United States, with many settling around San Antonio. Other Filipinos resettled in Texas after initially residing elsewhere in the United States. In 1910, there were six Filipinos living in Texas, by 1920 this number had increased to 30, and by 1930, the population had grown to 288. With the disbandment of the Philippine Scouts, many who remained in the military came to call Fort Sam Houston home, along with Filipina war brides. After World War II, many Filipino professionals began immigrating to Texas; 2,000 Filipino nurses called Houston home. In 1950, about 4,000 Filipino Americans were in Texas; their number had increased to 75,226 by 2000.

As more Filipino Americans came to Texas, the center of their population shifted to Houston, which today has one of the largest Filipino populations in the South. Fort Bend County near Houston has the highest percentage of Filipinos in Texas. With Texas being part of the Bible Belt, it is often a popular destination for emigrating Filipino Protestants. In 2000, Texas was home to the seventh-largest population of Filipino immigrants. According to the 2010 Census, there were 137,713 Filipino Americans and multiracial Filipino Americans in Texas. In 2011, five percent (86,400) of all Filipino immigrants in the United States lived in Texas. In 2016, there were more than twenty thousand Filipinos living in the Houston area.

As of the 2020 Census, there are 234,091 Filipinos in Texas.

=== Washington ===
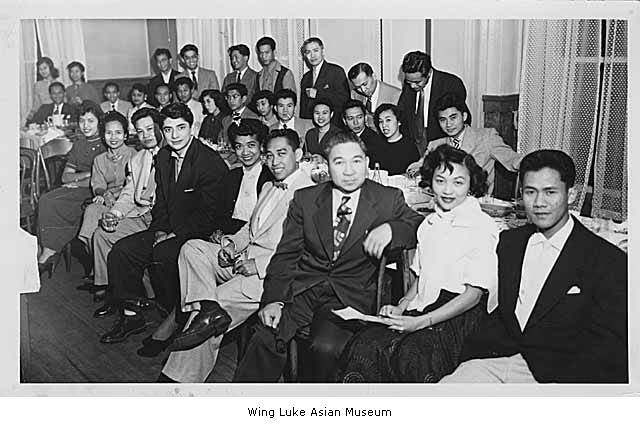
The Filipino Student Association at the University of Washington, 1952

The first documented Filipino in Washington state was a lumber mill employee at Port Blakely in 1888, but there were some earlier instances of Filipino seamen settling in the Puget Sound region. In 1910, the population of Filipinos in Washington was twelve times greater than in California. In 1920, there were almost a thousand (958) Filipinos in Washington. Pre-World War II, Washington had the second-largest population of Filipino Americans in the mainland United States—3,480 in 1930; this population had declined to 2,200 by 1940. A significant population of these early Filipinos were migratory workers, working in the canneries in Puget Sound, and harvesting crops in Yakima Valley.

In 1970, Filipino Americans were the fifth-largest minority population, with 11,462 persons, after African-Americans, Hispanic and Latino Americans, Native Americans, and Japanese Americans; they were 0.3% of the total population of Washington at the time; 87.2% lived in urban areas, and 7,668 Filipinos lived in the Seattle–Tacoma–Everett metropolitan area. In 1990, Filipinos were the largest population of Asian Pacific Americans in Washington. As of the 2010 Census, the state was home to the fifth largest Filipino American population in the nation. 60% of Filipino Americans living in Washington have arrived since 1965.

As of the 2020 Census, there are 194,682 Filipinos in Washington.

=== Nevada ===
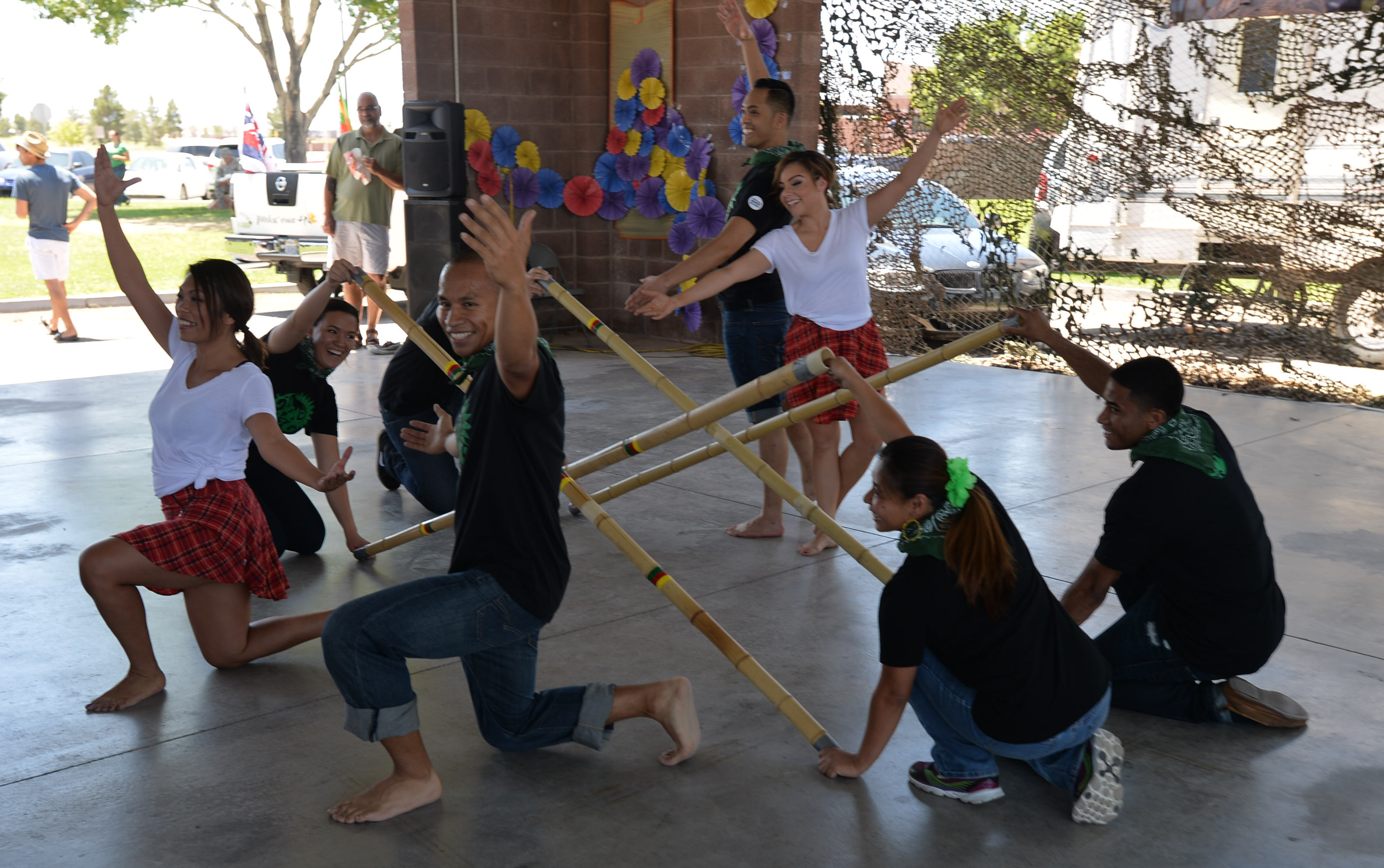
Tinikling dancers of the Asian Pacific American Association dance team, at Nellis Air Force Base, in 2015

Five Filipinos were documented in Nevada in 1920; the population increased to 47 in 1930. According to the Center of Immigration Studies, the Filipino population in Nevada grew 77.8% from 7,339 in 1990, to 33,046 in 2000. In 2000, Nevada was home to two percent (31,000) of all Filipino immigrants in the United States. Nevada's Filipino American population grew substantially from 2000 to 2010, with a 142% increase for a 3.6% share of the state's total population by 2010. More than half of Asian Americans in Nevada in 2010 were Filipino, and are Nevada's largest group of Asian Americans. In 2005, outside of Las Vegas Valley, the only other area in Nevada with a significant population of Filipinos was Washoe County. In 2012, about 124,000 Filipinos lived in Nevada, mostly in Las Vegas Valley; by 2015, it had risen to more than 138,000. In 2021, there were more than 200,000 Filipinos in Las Vegas.

The first known Filipinos in Clark County arrived from California during the Great Depression. Filipinos arriving in the mid-20th century settled primarily around Fifth and Sixth Streets, and an enclave remains in this area. Beginning in 1995, five to six thousand Filipinos from Hawaii began to migrate to Las Vegas. In 2005, Filipinos were the largest ethnic group of Asian Americans in Las Vegas. In 2013, according to the American Community Survey, 2011–2013, there were an estimated 114,989 Filipinos (+/-5,293), including multiracial Filipinos, in Clark County; according to other sources, there were about 140,000 Filipinos living in Las Vegas. According to The Star-Ledger in 2014, more than 90,000 Filipino nationals resided in the Las Vegas area. By 2015, Filipino Americans are more than half of the population of Asian Americans in Las Vegas. In 2024 there were about 178,655 Filipino Americans in the state, there is a trend of Filipino Americans relocating from Hawaii and California to Nevada due to rising cost of living and housing prices.

=== Florida ===
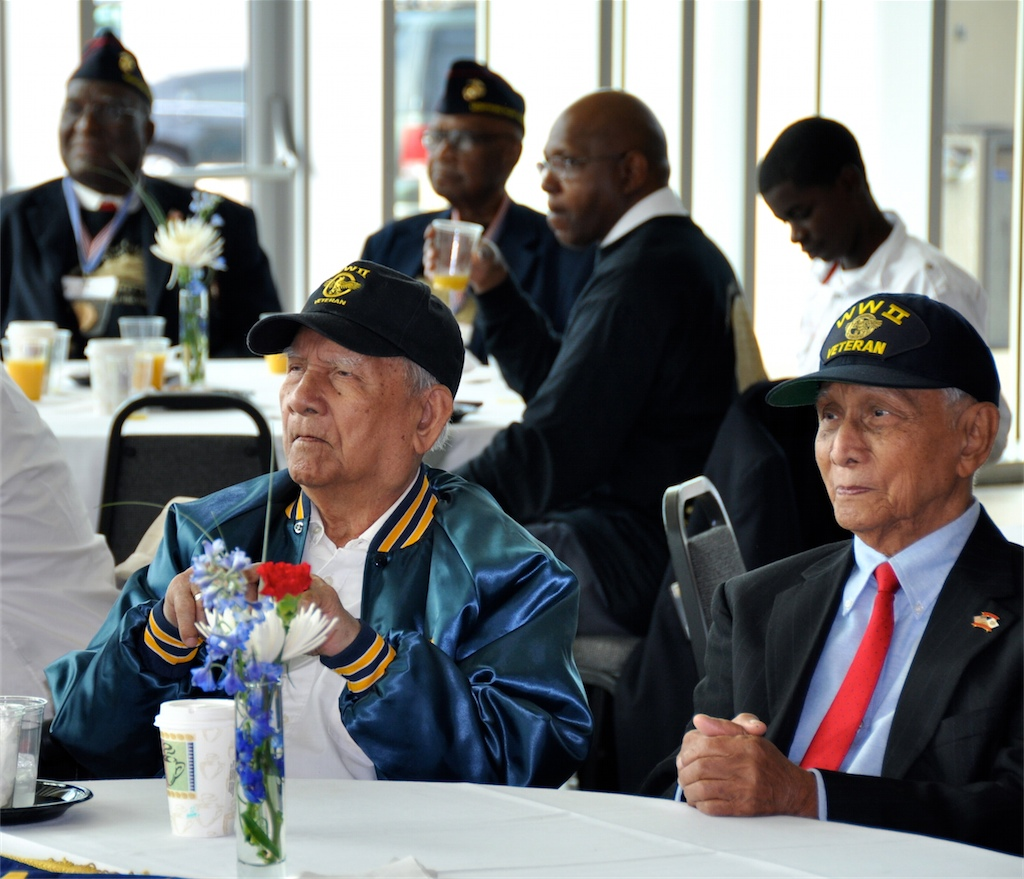
Filipino World War II veterans who fought at the Battle of Bataan in Jacksonville

In 1910, there was a single Filipino living in Florida, this population increased to 11 in 1920, and 46 in 1930. 1990 United States census, the 31,945 Filipinos were the state's largest population of Asian Pacific Americans. Florida is home to 122,691 Filipino Americans, according to the 2010 Census. As of 2013, Filipinos are the largest group of Asian Americans in Duval County. The 2000 Census reported there were around 15,000 Filipino Americans living in the Jacksonville metropolitan area, though community leaders estimated the true number was closer to 25,000. Indeed, the 2010 Census found the community numbered at 25,033, about 20% of the state's Filipino Americans. Many of Jacksonville's Filipinos served in or otherwise had ties to, the United States Navy, which has two bases in Jacksonville. Two of Florida's other metropolitan areas also have substantial Filipino American communities: the Miami metropolitan area has 21,535, and the Tampa Bay Area has 18,724.

=== Illinois ===
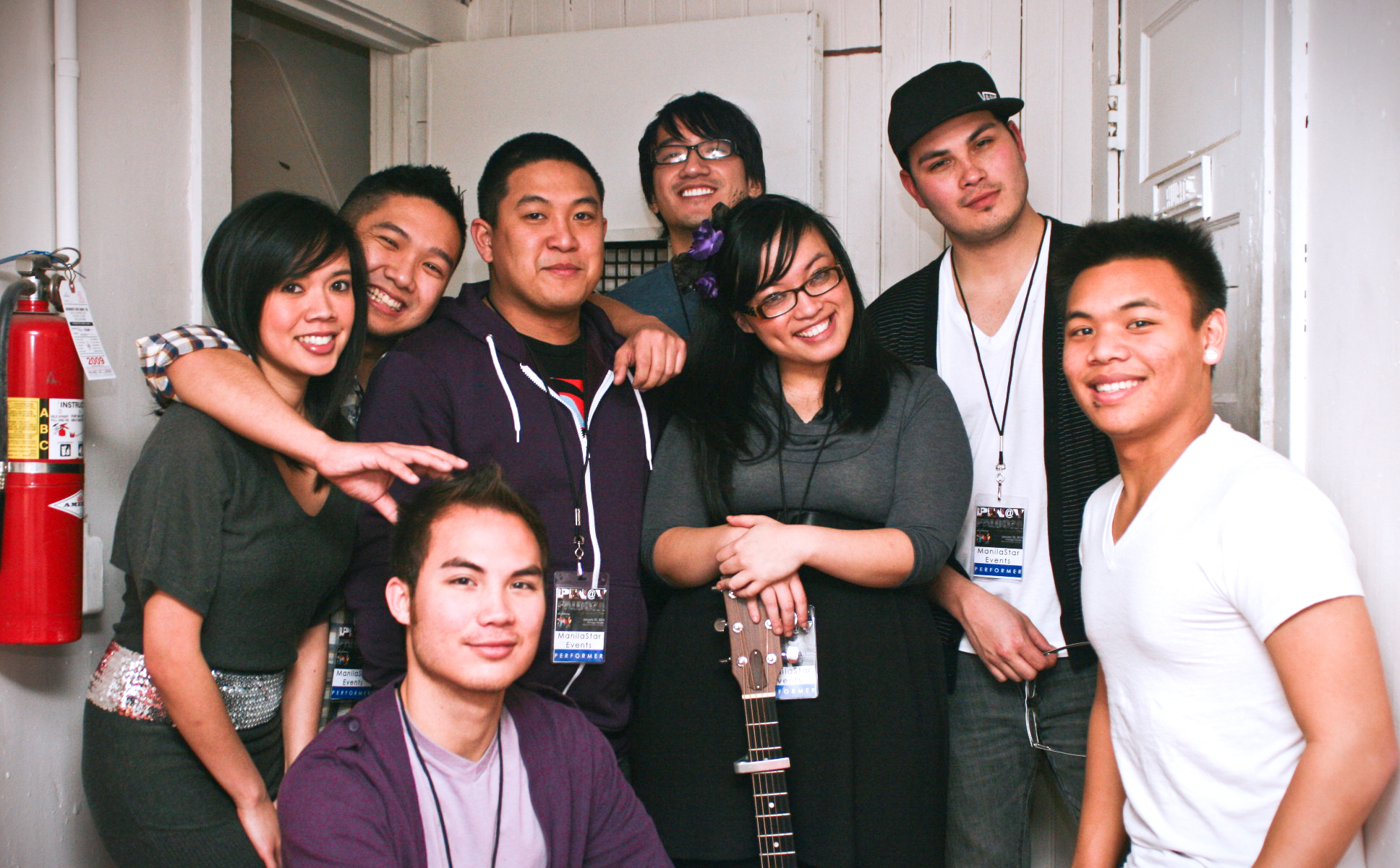
Filipino American musicians in Chicago, 2010

Filipino migration to the Chicago area began in 1906 with the immigration of pensionados, consisting predominantly of men. A significant number of them married non-Filipinos, mainly Eastern or Southern European women. At one point, 300 of these early Chicago Filipinos worked for the Pullman Company, and overall tended to be more educated than most men of their age. During the 1930s, they were predominantly in the Near South Side until the 1965 immigration reforms. In 1930, there were 1,796 Filipinos living in Chicago. The population decreased to 1,740 in 1940 with men outnumbering women 25:1. In the 1960s, there were 3,587 Filipinos in Illinois, the population increased to 12,654 in 1970 and 43,889 in 1980, growing at a pace greater than the national average, and made up largely of professionals and their families. By the 1970s, Filipinas outnumbered Filipinos, with a total of 9,497 Filipinos in the Chicago Area; the total population of Filipinos in Illinois was 12,654, of which 57% were college graduates. In 1990, Filipinos were the largest population of Asian Americans in Illinois, with a population of 64,224. Outside the Chicago metropolitan area, there were fewer Filipinos.

In 2000, 100,338 Filipino Americans lived in Illinois— 95,928 in the Chicago metropolitan area. In that same year, among ethnic groups in the Chicago metropolitan area, Filipinos had the highest proportion of foreign- born. By the 2010 Census, 139,090 Filipino Americans and multiracial Filipino Americans lived in Illinois, 131,388 lived within the Chicago metropolitan area. As of 2010, Filipinos were the second-largest population of Asian Americans in Illinois after Indian Americans. In 2011, five percent (84,800) of all Filipino immigrants in the United States lived in Illinois, the majority of whom (78,400) lived in the Chicago metropolitan area. Although not as concentrated as other Asian American groups, they are the fourth-largest ethnicity currently immigrating to the Chicago metro area. In 2011, the Chicago metropolitan area was home to four percent of all Filipino immigrants in the United States. In 2019, more than 145,000 Filipinos lived in the Chicago metropolitan area. According to the 2023 American Community Survey, there were a 174,442 Filipinos in Illinois, being 3.9% of the national Filipino American population, with Cook, DuPage, Lake, and Will counties having Filipino populations greater than ten thousand people. A large concentration of Filipino Americans resides in the North and Northwest sides, often near hospitals.

=== New York ===
In 1970, there were 14,279 Filipinos in New York State. Filipinos in New York City were more educated than the total population and Non-Hispanic Whites, but lower income then Non-Hispanic Whites, this is seen as they had a per Capita Income of $56,873 which was significantly lower than $81,361 for the White population. Both Filipino men and women had higher earnings than the total population but significantly lower earnings than Whites. In 2010, there were 104,287 single-race Filipino Americans living in New York State. In 2011, five percent (84,400) of all Filipino immigrants in the United States lived in New York. By 2013, an estimated over 120,000+ single- and multi-racial Filipino Americans lived in New York State.

==== New York City metropolitan area ====
In the 1970s and 1980s, Filipinos in New York and New Jersey had a higher educational and social status than the mainly working-class Filipinos elsewhere in the US; more than half of Filipino immigrants to the metropolitan area were healthcare or other highly trained professionals, in contrast to established working-class Filipino American populations elsewhere. A profile of New York City's Filipino American population, based on an analysis of 1990 and 2000 U.S. census data, showed that Filipino New Yorkers surpassed non-Filipino New Yorkers as a whole in terms of income. Median household income of Filipinos in New York City was $81,929 in 2013; 68% held a bachelor's degree or higher. It should however be mentioned that in 2023, Filipinos in New Jersey had lower earnings than South and East Asian groups and well as Non-Hispanic Whites. It should also be noted that in New York City, Filipinos had lower earnings than Non-Hispanic Whites. The high percentage of healthcare professionals continues; in 2013, 30% of Filipinos were nurses or other professionals in the healthcare industry. In 1970, the New York metropolitan area had the largest concentration of Filipinos (12,455) east of the Rocky Mountains, and the fifth largest population of Filipinos of all metropolitan areas in the United States. In 1990, more Filipinos lived in urban New York (60,376), than in suburban New York (44,203)._{Table 1a} In 2008, the New York tri-state metropolitan area was home to 215,000 Filipinos. In 2010, according to the 2010 United States census, there were 217,349 Filipino Americans, including multiracial Filipino Americans, living in the New York-Northern New Jersey-Long Island, (NY-NJ-PA) metropolitan area. In 2011, eight percent of all Filipino immigrants in the United States lived in the New York City metropolitan region, and it had become a new destination for Filipino immigrants. In 2012, a Census-estimated 235,222 single-race and multiracial Filipino Americans lived in the broader New York-Newark-Bridgeport, New York-New Jersey-Connecticut-Pennsylvania Combined Statistical Area. By 2013 Census estimates, the New York-Northern New Jersey-Long Island, New York-New Jersey-Pennsylvania MSA was estimated to be home to 224,266 Filipino Americans, 88.5% (about 200,000) of them single-race Filipinos. In 2013, 4,098 Filipinos legally immigrated to the New York-Northern New Jersey-Long Island, NY-NJ-PA core based statistical area; in 2012, this number was 4,879; 4,177 in 2011; 4,047 in 2010, 4,400 in 2009, and 5,985 in 2005. Little Manilas have emerged in the New York City metropolitan area, in Woodside, Queens; Jersey City, New Jersey; and Bergenfield, New Jersey. In 2017, one quarter of Filipino American adults in the metropolitan area work in the medical field.

===== New York City =====
Young Filipino Americans dressed as Katipuneros at the Philippine Independence Day Parade in Midtown Manhattan.

Filipinos have resided in New York City since the 1920s. In 1960, there were only 2,744 Filipinos in New York City. In 1990, there were 43,229 Filipinos increasing to around 54,993 in 2000. New York City was home to an estimated 82,313 Filipinos in 2011, representing a 7.7% increase from the estimated 77,191 in 2008. The 2010 census reported the borough of Queens was home to the largest concentration of Filipinos within New York City— about 38,000 individuals. In 2011, an estimated 56% of New York City's Filipino population, or about 46,000, lived in Queens. In 2014, Filipinos remained the fourth-largest population of Asian Americans in New York City, behind Chinese, Indians, and Koreans. The annual Philippine Independence Day Parade is traditionally held on the first Sunday of June in Manhattan.

In the 1920s, Filipinos settled near Brooklyn Navy Yard. Woodside, Queens, is known for its concentration of Filipinos. Of Woodside's 85,000 residents, about 13,000 (or 15%) are of Filipino background. Due to a significant concentration of Filipino businesses, the area has become known as Little Manila. Along the IRT Flushing Line (7 train), known colloquially as the Orient Express, the 69th Street station serves as the gateway to Queens' largest Little Manila, whose core spans Roosevelt Avenue between 63rd and 71st Streets. Filipinos are also concentrated in Jackson Heights and Elmhurst in Queens. There are also smaller Filipino communities in Jamaica, Queens, and parts of Brooklyn. The Benigno Aquino Triangle is located on Hillside Avenue in Hollis, Queens, to commemorate the slain Filipino political leader and to recognize the large Filipino American population in the area; it was dedicated in 1987. In 2022, a street sign was placed on Roosevelt Avenue to co-name the street at its intersection with 70th Street as "Little Manila Avenue".

=== New Jersey ===
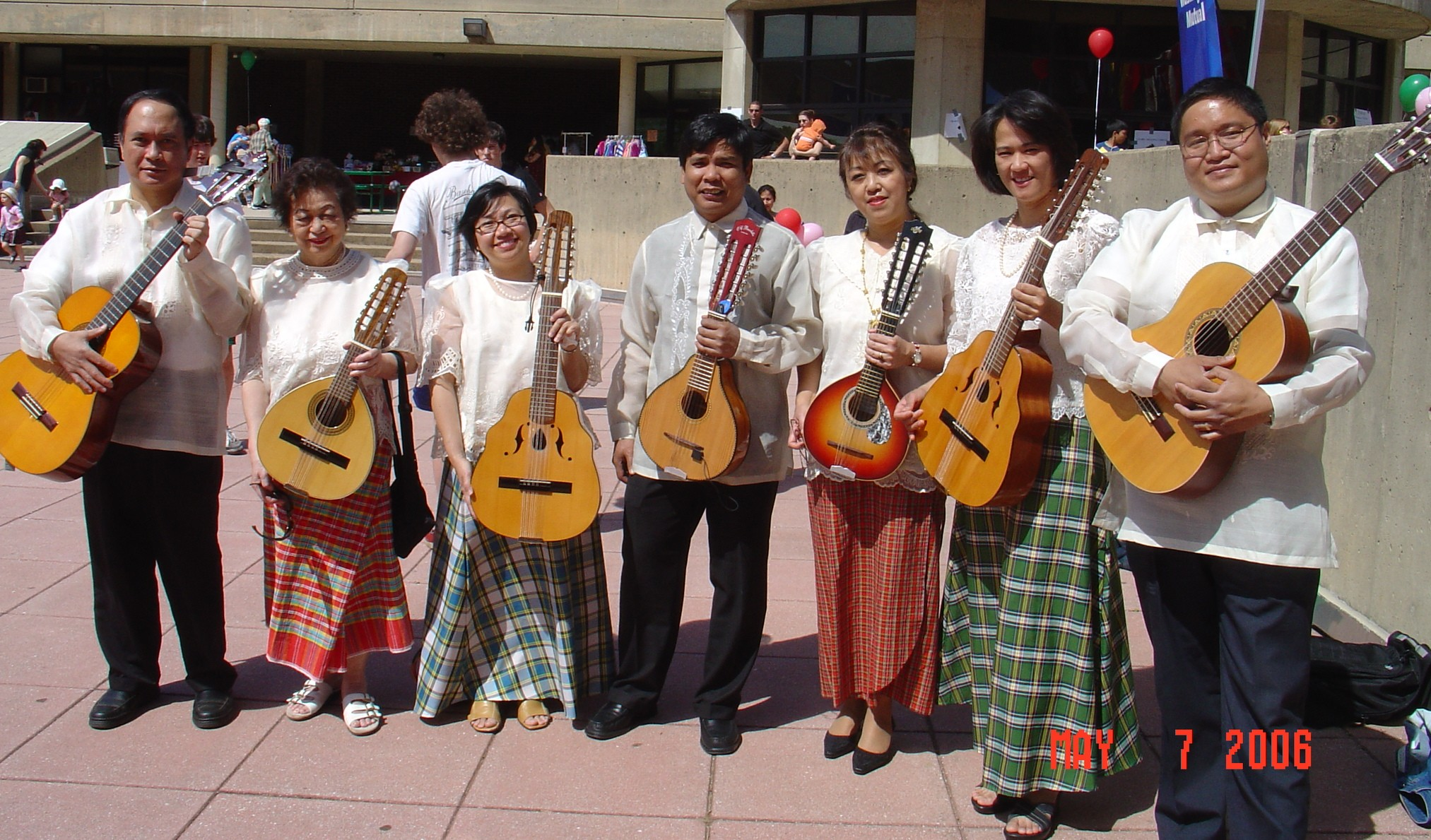
Filipino musicians in New Jersey in 2006

Filipinos are the third largest group of Asian Americans in New Jersey after Indian and Chinese Americans. In 2024, there were an estimated 120,000 Filipino Americans living in New Jersey. In 2010, there were 110,650 single-race Filipino Americans living in New Jersey. In 2011, New Jersey was home to five percent (86,600) of the United States' Filipino immigrants. By 2013, an estimated 134,647 single- and multi-racial Filipino Americans lived in New Jersey.

Bergen County, Hudson County, Middlesex County, and Passaic County (all in Northern and Central New Jersey) have the state's largest Filipino populations, and are home to over half the Filipinos residing in New Jersey. In Bergen County in particular, Bergenfield, along with Paramus, Hackensack, New Milford, Dumont, Fair Lawn, and Teaneck have become growing hubs for Filipino Americans. Taken as a whole, these municipalities are home to a significant proportion of Bergen County's Philippine population. A census-estimated 20,859 single-race Filipino Americans resided in Bergen County as of 2013, an increase from the 19,155 counted in 2010. Bergenfield has become known as Bergen County's Little Manila and hosts its annual Filipino American Festival. Within Bergen County, there are Filipino American organizations based in Paramus, Fair Lawn, and Bergenfield. In Hudson County, Jersey City is home to the largest Filipino population in New Jersey, with over 16,000 Filipinos in 2010, accounting for seven percent the city's population. This is an increase from 11,677 in 1990. In the 1970s, to acknowledge the Filipinos immigrating to Jersey City, the city named a street Manila Avenue.

=== Virginia ===
The first year that Filipinos were documented in Virginia by the United States Census Bureau was in 1920 when 97 Filipinos were counted; by 1930, that population increased to 126. In 1970, there were 7,128 Filipinos living in Virginia, 5,449 of whom lived in the Norfolk-Portsmouth metropolitan area. By 1980, there were 18,901 Filipinos in Virginia, with significant concentrations in Norfolk, and Virginia Beach. In the following decade, by 1990, the Filipino population in the Hampton Roads area increased by 116.8%, increasing to 19,977 in the area alone. In 1990, Filipinos were the largest population of Asian Pacific Americans in Virginia, followed by Korean Americans.

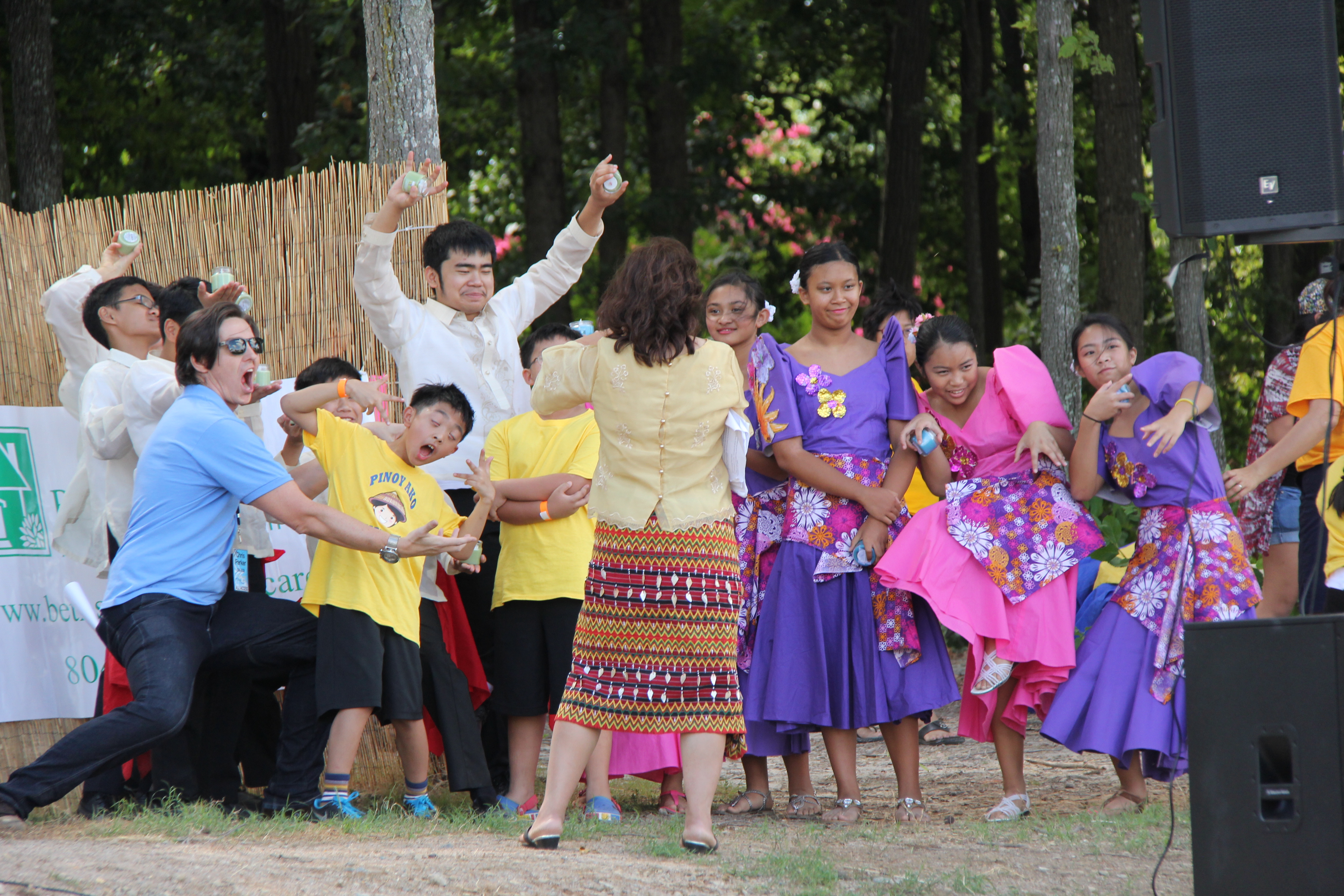
2015 Richmond Filipino Festival

In 2000, Virginia's Filipino population was 59,318. There were 90,493 Filipino Americans in Virginia as of 2010, 39,720 of whom lived in the Virginia part of the Hampton Roads metropolitan area. Many Filipinos settled around the Hampton Roads region near the Oceana Naval Air Station because the U.S. Navy had recruited them in the Philippines. In 2007, Filipino Americans made up one-quarter of all foreign-born residents of the area. In 2011, there were between 17,000 and 22,000 Filipino Americans living in Virginia Beach. Filipino immigrants in that population represent one-fifth of all immigrants living in Virginia Beach. A larger population of Filipino Americans, 40,292, reside in the Virginia part of the Washington metropolitan area. In the Greater Richmond Region, they are the largest population of Asian Americans in Prince George County. In 2025, there were 119,497 Filipinos in Virginia.

=== Elsewhere ===
See also: Filipinos in Michigan

The first Filipino immigrated to Annapolis after the Spanish–American War when Filipinos served at the United States Naval Academy. They dealt with institutional racism and later established organizations to support their community, including the Filipino-American Friendly Association. According to the 2010 Census, there were 56,909 Filipino Americans living in Maryland; Filipino Americans were the largest population of Asian Americans in Charles County. In 2020, there were 75,056 Filipino Americans in Maryland. In the neighboring District of Columbia, there were 3,670 Filipino Americans in 2010, 12.78% of the District's Asian American population. In 2020, the population of Filipino Americans in the District of Columbia increased to 5,325.

==== Guam ====
Filipinos on Guam pre-date Guam becoming a territory of the United States, going back to the late 17th Century. In 1830, there were 2,596 Filipinos on Guam, who were 40% of the islands population. Following reduction of the Chamorro population by the late 18th century, many of the descendent Chamorro would later on have a mixed heritage to include most of whom have partial Filipino heritage. In 1920, there were 396 Filipinos on Guam; the Filipinos were 3% of the islands total population. In 1930, there were 364 Filipinos on Guam; this increased to 569 in 1940. (Note: Filipinos were 2.6% of the islands total population in 1940.) From 1941 until 1962, civilian travel to Guam was restricted by presidential order, however Filipinos were allowed to travel to Guam as contractors for the United States Department of the Navy following an agreement with the government of the Philippines. By 1950 Filipinos became 12.2% of the islands population, totaling 7,258 individuals. In 1990, nearly two third of foreign born individuals on Guam were born in the Philippines (65.5%), of whom more than half were naturalized citizens (56.8%). In 2010, of the 159,358 people on Guam, slightly more than one in four (26.3%) were Filipino; at the time, Filipinos were the second largest population by ethnicity on Guam. In 2020, there were 54,242 Filipinos on Guam.

==== Alaska ====
Filipinos have been in Alaska since the 1700s and were the largest Asian American ethnicity in the state in 2000. In 2014, Filipinos made up 52% of Alaska's Asian American population. During the early 20th century, Alaska was the third-leading population center of Filipinos in the United States, after Hawaii and California; many worked seasonally in salmon canneries. The first efforts to recruit Filipinos to work in the canneries began in the 1910s. By 1920, there were 82 Filipinos in Alaska, only one of whom was a Filipina. In 1930, Filipinos, who were called "Alaskeros", made up 15% of the workers in the Alaskan fisheries. Filipinos were two-thirds of all Asians in Alaska in the 1930s. In many of the canneries, Filipinos were treated as "second class workers". According to the 2000 U.S. Census, there were 12,712 Filipino Americans in Alaska; By the 2010 U.S. Census that number had increased to 25,424 (alone or in combination), constituting 49% of Asian Americans in Alaska. In 2011, more than one in four (26%) immigrants in Alaska was Filipino. As of 2014, Filipino Americans are Anchorage's largest minority group. In 2020, there was 32,401 Filipino Americans in Alaska.

==== Utah ====
The first census that counted Filipinos in Utah was the 1930 decennial census, with a reduction of the Filipino population in Utah by 1940, by 1950 there were no longer any Filipinos documented in the state, with the population re-establishing itself by 1960. The population of Filipino Americans doubled between 2000 and 2010, to 6,467, having the third-highest rate of growth by state of Filipinos in the nation behind Texas and Florida. Filipinos primary concentrated within the Salt Lake City metropolitan area. In 2020, Filipino Americans were the second largest population of Asian Americans in Utah, with 20,132 individuals identifying themselves as Filipinos.

==== Other Insular areas and unincorporated territories ====
In the United States' insular areas in 1920 other than Guam, the Philippine Islands had the largest Filipino population of 10,207,696; the Panama Canal Zone 10, the Virgin Islands seven; (Note: The population of Filipinos in the Virgin Islands was also 7 in 1917.) there was a single Filipino in Puerto Rico. In 1930, the Filipino population of Puerto Rico increased to six, in the Virgin Islands it decreased to four. The population in the Panama Canal Zone increased to 37. In 1939, the Commonwealth of the Philippines conducted a census, which found there to be 16,000,303 people in the islands; not all counted were Filipinos, as there were tens of thousands of individuals with other nationalities, including people from Japan, China, the United States, Spain, and elsewhere. In 2000, there were 394 Filipinos in Puerto Rico. Filipinos are the largest demographic in the Commonwealth of the Northern Mariana Islands, making up 35% of its 53,833 people in 2010 and 2015. In 2020, Filipinos were the plurality of the population in the Commonwealth of the Northern Marianas Islands, with 17,719 of the commonwealths 47,329 people being Filipino. In American Samoa, there were 50 Filipinos in 1980, 415 in 1990, and 792 resident in 2000. In 2010 the population increased to 1,217, or 2.2% of the total population. In 2020, there were 1,699 Filipinos in American Samoa, and were the largest Asian population. In 2013, there remains a Filipino American population in the Virgin Islands; these Filipinos make up a few of the 6,648 persons counted as "Other races" in the 2010 Census. In 2023, there were around 500 Filipinos in the United States Virgin Islands; many of these Filipinos were employed as educators.

There are some migrants from the Philippines who work on Guantanamo Naval Base in southeastern Cuba; some youth who grew up on the base are Filipino or Filipino American.

List of states, and other areas, by population below 75,000 in 2010
| State | Filipino alone or in any combination |
|---|---|
| Maryland | 56,909 |
| Arizona | 53,067 |
| Guam | 48,647 |
| Pennsylvania | 33,021 |
| Michigan | 32,324 |
| North Carolina | 29,314 |
| Oregon | 29,101 |
| Georgia (U.S. state) | 28,528 |
| Ohio | 27,661 |
| Colorado | 26,242 |
| Alaska | 25,424 |
| Northern Mariana Islands | 21,339 |
| Massachusetts | 18,673 |
| Missouri | 17,706 |
| Indiana | 16,988 |
| Connecticut | 16,402 |
| Minnesota | 15,660 |
| South Carolina | 15,228 |
| Tennessee | 14,409 |
| Wisconsin | 13,158 |
| Oklahoma | 10,850 |
| Utah | 10,657 |
| Louisiana | 10,243 |
| Kansas | 9,399 |
| New Mexico | 8,535 |
| Kentucky | 8,402 |
| Alabama | 8,224 |
| Arkansas | 6,396 |
| Idaho | 6,211 |
| Iowa | 6,026 |
| Mississippi | 5,638 |
| Nebraska | 4,900 |
| Delaware | 4,637 |
| Rhode Island | 4,117 |
| District of Columbia | 3,670 |
| New Hampshire | 3,069 |
| West Virginia | 3,059 |
| Maine | 2,918 |
| Montana | 2,829 |
| South Dakota | 1,864 |
| North Dakota | 1,704 |
| Wyoming | 1,657 |
| American Samoa | 1,217 |
| Vermont | 1,035 |
| Puerto Rico | 445 |

=== U.S. metropolitan areas with large Filipino American populations (2010) ===
| Rank | City | Filipino American Population Size Alone or in Combination (2010 Census) | Total population | Percentage Filipino American |
|---|---|---|---|---|
| 1 | Los Angeles-Long Beach-Santa Ana, CA Metro Area | 463,626 | 12,828,837 | 3.61 |
| 2 | San Francisco-Oakland-Fremont, CA Metro Area | 287,879 | 4,335,391 | 6.64 |
| 3 | Honolulu, HI Metro Area | 234,894 | 953,207 | 24.64 |
| 4 | New York-Northern New Jersey-Long Island, NY-NJ-PA Metro Area | 217,349 | 18,897,109 | 1.15 |
| 5 | San Diego-Carlsbad-San Marcos, California Metro Area | 182,248 | 3,095,313 | 5.88 |
| 6 | Chicago-Joliet-Naperville, IL-IN-WI Metro Area | 130,781 | 9,461,105 | 1.38 |
| 7 | Riverside-San Bernardino-Ontario, CA Metro Area | 117,928 | 4,224,851 | 2.79 |
| 8 | Las Vegas-Paradise, Nevada Metro Area | 108,141 | 1,951,269 | 5.54 |
| 9 | San Jose-Sunnyvale-Santa Clara, CA Metro Area | 105,403 | 1,836,911 | 5.73 |
| 10 | Seattle-Tacoma-Bellevue, WA Metro Area | 97,867 | 3,439,809 | 2.84 |
| 11 | Washington-Arlington-Alexandria, DC-VA-MD-WV Metro Area | 75,444 | 5,582,170 | 1.35 |
| 12 | Sacramento–Arden-Arcade–Roseville, CA Metro Area | 73,866 | 2,149,127 | 3.43 |
| 13 | Vallejo-Fairfield, CA Metro Area | 52,641 | 413,344 | 12.73 |
| 14 | Houston-Sugar Land-Baytown, TX Metro Area | 47,926 | 5,946,800 | 0.80 |
| 15 | Stockton, CA Metro Area | 46,447 | 685,306 | 6.77 |
| 16 | Kahului-Wailuku, HI Micro Area | 44,892 | 154,834 | 28.99 |
| 17 | Hilo, HI Micro Area | 40,878 | 185,079 | 22.08 |
| 18 | Phoenix-Mesa-Glendale, AZ Metro Area | 39,913 | 4,192,887 | 0.95 |
| 19 | Virginia Beach-Norfolk-Newport News, VA-NC Metro Area | 39,871 | 1,671,683 | 2.38 |
| 20 | Dallas–Fort Worth-Arlington, TX Metro Area | 33,206 | 6,371,773 | 0.52 |
| 21 | Philadelphia-Camden-Wilmington, PA-NJ-DE-MD Metro Area | 31,200 | 5,965,343 | 0.52 |
| 22 | Oxnard-Thousand Oaks-Ventura, CA Metro Area | 25,103 | 823,318 | 3.04 |
| 23 | Jacksonville, FL Metro Area | 25,033 | 1,345,596 | 1.86 |
| 24 | Portland-Vancouver-Hillsboro, OR-WA Metro Area | 23,864 | 2,226,009 | 1.07 |
| 25 | Baltimore-Towson, MD Metro Area | 22,418 | 2,710,489 | 0.82 |
| 26 | Miami-Fort Lauderdale-Pompano Beach, FL Metro Area | 21,535 | 5,564,635 | 0.38 |
| 27 | Kapaa, HI Micro Area | 21,423 | 67,091 | 31.93 |
| 28 | Detroit-Warren-Livonia, MI Metro Area | 20,825 | 4,296,250 | 0.48 |
| 29 | Bakersfield-Delano, CA Metro Area | 20,296 | 839,631 | 2.41 |
| 30 | Tampa-St. Petersburg-Clearwater, FL Metro Area | 18,724 | 2,783,243 | 0.67 |

=== Little Manilas ===
In areas with sparse Filipino populations, they often form loose-knit social organizations aimed at maintaining a "sense of family", which is a key feature of Filipino culture. These organizations generally arrange social events, especially of a charitable nature, and keep members up-to-date with local events. They are often organized into regional associations, which are a small part of Filipino American life. Filipino Americans formed close-knit neighborhoods, notably in California and Hawaii. A few communities have "Little Manilas", civic and business districts tailored to the Filipino American community.

== Language ==
Filipino Americans form a multilingual community but the two most spoken languages are English and Tagalog. In 2009, Tagalog was the fourth largest language spoken in the United States with around 1.5 million speakers.

== Religion ==
According to a Pew Research Center survey published in July 2012, the majority of Filipino American respondents are Roman Catholic (65%), followed by Protestant (21%), unaffiliated (8%), and Buddhist (1%). There are also smaller populations of Filipino American Muslims—particularly those who originate from the Southern Philippines.

== Socioeconomic status ==
=== Economics ===
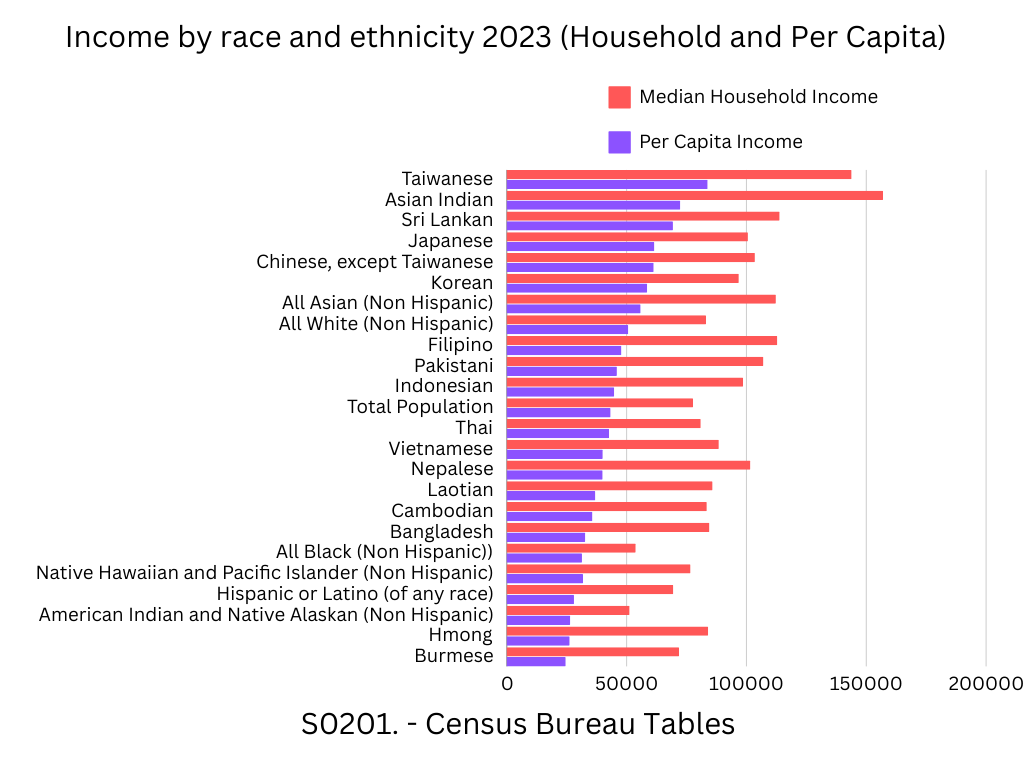
Income by race and ethnicity 2023 and Asian American Group (Household and Per Capita)

Filipino Americans are largely middle class with of Filipino American households 62% being middle income. However, only 21% of Filipino American households are Upper Income compared to 27% for all Asian households. This means that Filipino Americans are less likely to be Upper Income than all Asian Americans. Filipino Americans have high labor force participation rates and 67% of Filipino Americans are employed.

Filipino Americans are more likely to live in larger, overcrowded (8.7% of Filipino housing units compared to 3.5% of total population), multi-generational (34%) households compared to the general population. The average household size for Filipino Americans in 2023 was 2.99 compared to 2.49 for the general population.

While Filipino Americans had aa higher median annual household income, the Per Capita Income for Filipino Americans was $47,819 which was lower than for all Asians ($55,561) and Non-Hispanic Whites ($50,675). Individual earnings for both Filipino Males and Females were significantly lower than for all Asians, suggesting multiple earners in a household.

The impressive annual median household income and low poverty rates must be approached with caution, for median household income represents the combined earnings of several family or household members often living in crowded and less than adequate houses.

Filipino American full-time, year-round workers were paid lower than the US average and had a lower average hourly wage of $29.35 then the US average of $29.95 and AAPI average of $30.73

Filipino American households in Los Angeles had a net worth of $243,000 with -$5,000 in debts compared to a net worth of $355,000 for White households, $595,000 for Japanese households, $408,500 for Chinese households and $460,000 for Indian American households.

Filipino Americans had a significantly higher rate of food insecurity (11%) than all Asians and White Americans (6%).

The representation of Filipino Americans employed in health care is high. Other sectors of the economy where Filipino Americans have significant representation are in the public sector, and in the service sector. Compared to Asian American women of other ethnicities, and women in the United States in general, Filipina Americans are more likely to be part of the work force; a large population, nearly one fifth (18%), of Filipina Americans worked as registered nurses. There is also a large number of Filipino domestic workers and care-givers in the US. More than 60% of Filipino Americans work in more than 60% work in low-wage and/or service-sector work.

Filipino Americans own a variety of businesses, making up 10.5% of all Asian owned businesses in the United States in 2007. In 2002, according to the Survey of Business Owners, there were over 125,000 Filipino-owned businesses; this increased by 30.4% to over 163,000 in 2007. By then, 25.4% of these businesses were in the retail industry, 23% were in the health care and social assistance industries, and they employed more than 142,000 people and generated almost $15.8 billion in revenue. Of those, just under three thousand (1.8% of all Filipino-owned businesses) were million dollar or more businesses. This means Filipino-owned businesses are significantly less likely to be million dollar or more than all Asians (5%). California had the largest number of Filipino-owned businesses, with the Los Angeles metropolitan area having the largest number of any metropolitan area in the United States.

The Philippines is the largest exporters of Nurses and this is something that can be traced back to US colonialism, as a result there is brain drain in the Philippine. America has been relying on Filipino nurses on the frontlines since the AIDs pandemic. Despite making up only 4% of registered nurses in the US, the make up nearly a third of Covid-related deaths among registered nurses.

American schools have also hired and sponsored the immigration of Filipino teachers and instructors. Some of these teachers were forced into labor outside the field of education, and mistreated by their recruiters.

Among Overseas Filipinos, Filipino Americans are the largest remitters of U.S. dollars to the Philippines. In 2005, their combined dollar remittances reached a record-high of almost $6.5 billion. In 2006, Filipino Americans sent more than $8 billion, which represents 57% of the total foreign remittances received by the Philippines. By 2012, this amount had reached $10.6 billion, but made up only 43% of total remittances. In 2021, the United States was the largest source of remittances to the Philippines, making up 40.5% of the $31.4 billion remittances received by the Philippines.

Filipino Americans had a lower poverty rate (7%) than the total population, this correlates with the Filipino American unemployment rate being only 3% and a high labor force participation rate of 67%, and households with multiple earners. This correlation is backed up by data from the report on Poverty in the United States: 2023, of all Americans, those who Worked full-time• year-round had a significantly lower poverty rate than the total population.

=== Education ===
Filipino Americans have high educational attainment rates in the United States with 47.9% of all Filipino Americans over the age of 25 having a bachelor's degree in 2004, which correlates with rates observed in other Asian American subgroups.^{fig.11} By 2023, half of all Filipino Americans over 25 had a bachelor's degree, with immigrants more likely to have at least a bachelor's degree (52%) than United States born Filipinos (46%). The post-1965 wave of Filipino professionals immigrating to the U.S. to make up the education, healthcare, and information technology employee shortages also accounts for the high educational attainment rates. However Filipino Americans are significantly less likely to attain a Graduates degree (11.5%) compared to the total population (14.3%) and all Asians (6.6)%.

However, second generation Filipino Americans have trended to have a lower educational achievement than their first generation parents. Filipino Americans are 60% less likely to choose Science, Technology, Engineering and Maths(STEM) than other Asian groups.

Studies show that young Filipino American men are not encouraged to pursue college unlike some East and South Asian groups and are stereotyped as "Lazy" "delinquents" "failures" and "gang-members". 60% of Filipino American boys are bullied during middle school.

According to some studies only 39% of Filipino American men (ages 25–34) had attained a bachelor's degree, in comparison to 87% of Asian Indian American men, 69% of Chinese American men, 63% of Japanese American men, 62% of Korean American men, and 42 percent of Vietnamese American men. The same study showed that Filipino men with bachelor's degrees have lower median wages of $30 an hour compared to Chinese and Indian immigrant men who had median wages of $40 an hour.

Educational Attainment: 2004 (Percent of Population 25 and Older)^{fig.11}
| Ethnicity | High School Graduation Rate | Bachelor's Degree or More |
|---|---|---|
| Asian Indians | 90.2% | 67.9% |
| Filipino | 90.8% | 47.9% |
| Chinese | 80.8% | 50.2% |
| Japanese | 93.4% | 43.7% |
| Korean | 90.2% | 50.8% |
| Total US Population | 83.9% | 27.0% |

Due to the strong American influence in the Philippine education system, first generation Filipino immigrants are also at advantage in gaining professional licensure in the United States. According to a study conducted by the American Medical Association, Philippine-trained physicians comprise the second-largest group of foreign-trained physicians in the United States (20,861 or 8.7% of all practicing international medical graduates in the U.S.). Other physicians, in order to immigrate from the Philippines, re-licensed as nurses. In addition, Filipino American dentists trained in the Philippines comprise the second-largest group of foreign-trained dentists in the United States. An article from the Journal of the American Dental Association asserts that 11% of all foreign-trained dentists licensed in the U.S. are from the Philippines; India is ranked first with 25.8% of all foreign dentists.

The significant drop in the percentage of Filipino nurses from the 1980s to 2000 is because of the increase in the number of countries recruiting Filipino nurses (European Union, the Middle East, Japan), as well as the increase in the number of other countries sending nurses to the United States. Even with the significant drop, in 2005 Filipino American nurses made up 3.7% of the total United States nursing population, and were 40% of all foreign-trained nurses in the United States.

== See also ==
- Demographics of Asian Americans
- History of Filipino Americans
- List of Filipino Americans
