= Filipinos in Michigan =

Immigration of people born in the Philippines and of Filipino ancestry to Michigan

The first Filipinos in Michigan were three elite students in scholarship at the University of Michigan, recruited by Dean C. Worcester. Working Filipinos began immigrating to Michigan in 1903, following the adoption of the Pensionado Act. After seeing the success of the program, other Filipinos began to self-fund their own immigration to the United States; these first immigrants settled in Hawaii, San Francisco, Los Angeles, and Seattle. These early immigrants faced racism and the struggles of the Great Depression, and moved to the Midwestern United States in hopes of finding better employment opportunities. Some of these Pinoys settled in Detroit, working in the automotive manufacturing. Others, including Pinays, worked in the hospitality industry, and they developed a small community.

After World War Two, thousands of war brides arrived in the United States from the Philippines. There was enough of a community to start a Filipino Women's Club of Detroit in 1952. Additional ethnic organizations were found to support Filipino people in Michigan, both at U. of Michigan and in the cities, from the 1950s through the 1980s.

Almost all Filipinos in Michigan arrived after 1965, with the passage of a new immigration law. The first wave of nurses from the Philippines arrived in the 1970s, including to Ann Arbor. As of 2010, 22,500 Filipino-Americans lived in Michigan. As of 2020, the Filipino community is large and thriving; over 500 people celebrated the feast of Santo Niño in Detroit that January. As of 2024, over 52,000 Filipino-Americans now live in Michigan.
