= John Kouns =

American photographer (1929–2019)

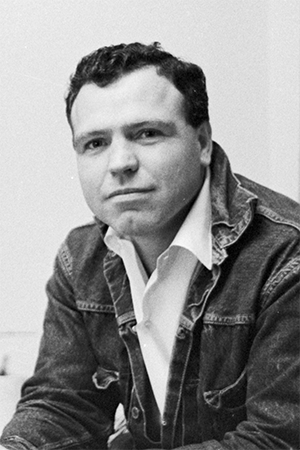
- Born: John Alexander Kouns; September 21, 1929; Alameda, California
- Died: January 5, 2019 (aged 89); Sausalito, California
- Education: New York Institute of Photography; U.S. Navy aerial photography training
- Occupation: Photographer · Photojournalist · Social justice activist
- Years active: c. 1950s–2000s
- Known for: Leading chronicler of United Farm Workers and Civil Rights Movement; creator of “guerilla camera” style
- Spouse: Anne Baele
- Children: Two

John Kouns (September 21, 1929 – January 5, 2019) was a photographer and social justice activist who played an important role in documenting the United Farm Workers movement and the Civil Rights Movement.

== Early life ==
Kouns was born in Alameda, California, in 1929 and grew up in the Santa Clara Valley in a middle class family. Despite an apolitical family background, he developed a strong sense of social justice. Deeply impacted by Richard Wright's Native Son, he joined the NAACP at age 15. Kouns graduated from San Jose State College with a degree in physical education, served in the U.S. Navy in the early 1950s during the Korean War, and later attended the New York Institute of Photography, where he was influenced by Life Magazine photojournalist W. Eugene Smith.

== Career ==
Kouns became a member of three unions before age 30: The International Longshore and Warehouse Union by virtue of his work at a cannery, the International Brotherhood of Teamsters because of his job at a printing factory, and the Wire Service Guild when he was employed by United Press International. In the early 1960s, Kouns became a free-lance photographer, and in 1961 joined other early photographers of California farmworkers such as George Ballis and Ernest Lowe working in the fields of Tulare County. That same year Kouns met Jim Drake, an influential union organizer, and became involved in the California Migrant Ministry. He later spent two years documenting the Civil Rights Movement, including the 16th Street Baptist Church bombing in Montgomery, Alabama, one of the Selma to Montgomery marches, and the March on Washington for Jobs and Freedom. Beginning in the summer of 1965, and influenced by John Steinbeck's The Grapes of Wrath and by the photography of Dorothea Lange and Russell Lee, Kouns turned his camera toward the United Farm Workers Movement. He supported himself and raised money for the labor movement during this time by traveling throughout California and mounting photographic exhibitions at churches, libraries, schools, and union halls.

== Impact ==
Journalist Lorenza Munoz said that Kouns was "one of the leading chroniclers of the farm worker labor rights struggle led by Cesar Chavez" in the 1960s and 1970s. Historian Richard Steven Street has written that Kouns was the first photographer to focus on the California Migrant Ministry (CMM), one of the early important forces in the farmworker movement. Kouns documented the Delano grape strike, the farm workers march from Delano to Sacramento (and the subsequent boycott of table grapes) in 1966, Robert F. Kennedy's 1966 Senate hearings in California on migratory labor, and the early 1970s Salinas Lettuce strike (also known as the Salad Bowl strike. He also photographed both Cesar Chavez and Dolores Huerta in what later became iconic images. His photographs have been published in a variety of books and periodicals, including Newsweek, Ramparts Magazine, and books written by the labor historian Richard Steven Street. Along with other farmworker photographers such as Jon Lewis and Gerhard Gscheidle, Kouns never considered himself a neutral or objective photojournalist; he carried a picket sign as well as a camera. Kouns developed a style that he called "Guerilla Camera" which attempted to move the cause of civil rights forward with his photography, journalism, exhibitions, and activism.

== Legacy ==
Kouns' body of work is held by the Tom and Ethel Bradley Center in the University Library, Special Collections and Archives, California State University, Northridge.

== Exhibitions ==
- An American Leader: Cesar E. Chavez, Anaheim Museum, November 2000-April 2001.
- An American Leader: Cesar E. Chavez, Latino Museum of History, Art and Culture, Los Angeles, April 29-August 18, 2000.
- From Selma to Montgomery: The Voters Registration Campaigns of 1963 and 1965, Younes and Soraya Nazarian Center for the Performing Arts, February–May 2020.
- Hope and Dignity for Farmworkers, Younes and Soraya Nazarian Center for the Performing Arts, November–December 2022.
- Hope and Dignity: The Farmworker Movement, Museum of Social Justice, Los Angeles, August 15, 2024 – January 26, 2025.
