= Jim Drake (labor organizer) =

American labor and community organizer (1937–2001)

James Lynn "Jim" Drake
- Born: 25 December 1937; Jefferson, Ohio, U.S.
- Died: September 3, 2001 (aged 63); Pittsfield, Massachusetts, U.S.
- Education: Occidental College (B.A. Philosophy), Union Theological Seminary (M.Div, 1962)
- Occupation: Minister · Labor organizer · Community leader
- Years active: 1962–2001
- Employer(s): California Migrant Ministry; United Farm Workers; Industrial Areas Foundation
- Known for: UFW boycott strategy; grassroots organizing in farmworker, housing & community campaigns
- Spouse: Miriam Rabban
- Children: 4

James Lynn Drake (December 25, 1937 – September 3, 2001) was an American minister, labor organizer, and community leader. Drake worked with César Chávez in the early United Farm Workers movement and later organized campaigns involving labor, housing, and education.

== Early life and education ==
Jim Drake was born on December 25, 1937, in Jefferson, Ohio. He spent much of his early childhood in Oklahoma before his family moved to Thermal, California, a small farmworker town in the Coachella Valley. His father taught migrant children, and his mother managed the school cafeteria. Drake studied philosophy at Occidental College and later graduated from Union Theological Seminary in 1962. Drake was ordained in the United Church of Christ and initially planned to serve as a National Park Service pastor.

== Career ==
In 1962, Drake joined the California Migrant Ministry, an ecumenical organization representing various Christian denominations. That same year, he was assigned to observe and assist César Chávez in organizing agricultural laborers. Drake was initially assigned to work with Chávez for three months but remained with the organization for 16 years. He later became one of Chávez's senior aides.

Drake served as Chávez's administrative assistant, directed the union's first cooperative, and helped conceive and lead the UFW's early boycotts. In 1965, during the Delano grape strike, Drake helped organize the national boycott of Schenley Industries. He later led the national table-grape boycott. In 1970, growers signed union contracts with the UFW. Drake oversaw organizing campaigns in California, Texas, Arizona, and New York, all while remaining on the payroll of the California Migrant Ministry.

In a 1968 speech, Chavez said that "The priests of the California Migrant Ministry, Chris Hartmire and Jim Drake, have been with us from the beginning. They took losses in their church because of the Migrant Ministry and the suffering they accepted was for the migrants and for justice. It was from them that we learned the importance of the support of the church in our struggle."

Drake advocated nonviolence but was sometimes subjected to physical intimidation, including partial hearing loss caused by a Teamster blowing a bullhorn into his ear. He also stood down armed growers and once had his mustache nearly ripped out by border vigilantes.

In 1978, Drake left the UFW and moved to Mississippi, where he founded the Mississippi Pulpwood Cutters Association, the state's first interracial organization of woodcutters. The association won improvements in lumber measurement standards, formed a cooperative to reduce equipment costs, and created a credit union for member access to loans.

In 1983, he joined the Industrial Areas Foundation (IAF), a national network of faith-based and community organizing groups. His first assignment with the IAF was with the Valley Interfaith Organization in the Rio Grande Valley, where he helped secure water and sewer services for residents in unincorporated colonias.

In 1987, Drake organized South Bronx Churches, a coalition of over 40 congregations in New York City. South Bronx Churches participated in campaigns that led to the construction of more than 800 units of Nehemiah housing, improvements to local subway stations, and the founding of the Bronx Leadership Academy public high school.

In 1994, Drake co-founded the Greater Boston Interfaith Organization. The organization worked on housing, education, and immigrant rights. Under his leadership, the organization raised over $5 million in private funds to match public commitments.

== Personal life ==
Drake was married five times. He died of lung cancer on September 3, 2001 (Labor Day) at the age of 63, at Brookshire Medical Center in Pittsfield, Massachusetts. At the time of his death, he lived in Manhattan and Spencertown, New York. He was survived by his wife, Miriam Rabban, and four children.

== Legacy ==
Drake's archival papers are held at the Walter P. Reuther Library at Wayne State University.
