= Chris Hartmire =

American minister and social justice activist (1932-2022)

Wayne Clyde "Chris" Hartmire Jr.
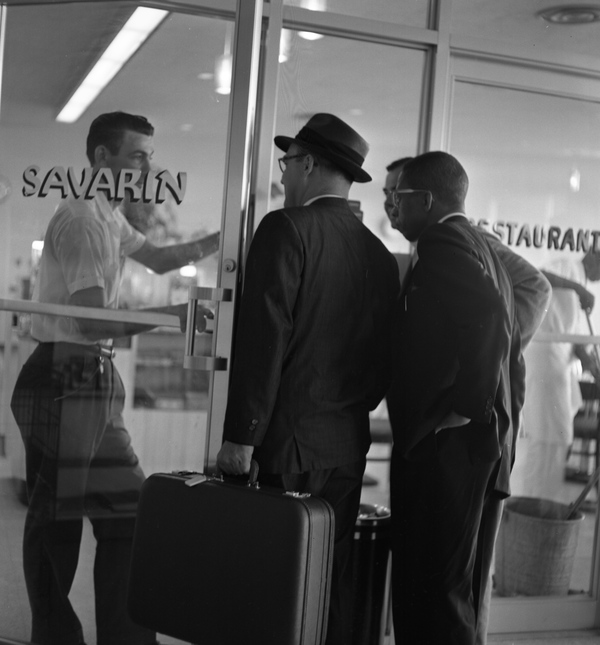
- Hartmire (right, profile facing center) testing segregated dining with fellow Freedom Riders Rev. Robert J. Stone (left) and Rev. John W. Collier (center) at Tallahassee Municipal Airport, June 15, 1961
- Born: June 5, 1932; Philadelphia, Pennsylvania, U.S.
- Died: December 18, 2022 (aged 90); Claremont, California, U.S.
- Education: Princeton University (B.S. Civil Engineering, 1954); Union Theological Seminary (M.Div.)
- Occupation: Presbyterian minister · Civil rights activist · Labor organizer
- Years active: 1961–2001
- Organizations: California Migrant Ministry; National Farm Worker Ministry; Loaves and Fishes (Sacramento)
- Known for: Directing California Migrant Ministry (1961–1971); founding director of National Farm Worker Ministry; organizing church support for UFW and Delano grape strike
- Spouse: Jane "Pudge" Hartmire (m. 1954–2017)
- Children: 4

Wayne Clyde "Chris" Hartmire Jr. (June 5, 1932 – December 18, 2022) was an American Presbyterian minister, civil rights activist, and labor organizer. As director of the California Migrant Ministry, he organized Protestant church support for César Chávez and the United Farm Workers. He later became the founding director of the National Farm Worker Ministry.

== Early life and education ==
Chris Hartmire was born in Philadelphia in 1932 and raised in Upper Darby, Pennsylvania, in a middle-class Presbyterian family. He attended Upper Darby High School and in 1954 earned a degree in civil engineering from Princeton University. He was a naval officer in the mid-1950s, and later he enrolled at Union Theological Seminary in New York, where he was influenced by Dietrich Bonhoeffer's theology of social justice.

== Ministry and early activism ==
After receiving his Master of Divinity, Hartmire was ordained in 1960 and began working with East Harlem Protestant Parish, running youth programs primarily for African American and Puerto Rican teens. In 1961, he joined a Freedom Ride to challenge segregation in the South. He was arrested in Tallahassee, Florida for unlawful assembly while peacefully asserting the right to be served in a segregated airport restaurant.

== California Migrant Ministry ==
That same year, Hartmire moved to California to direct the California Migrant Ministry (CMM), a program originally founded in the 1920s to serve migrant farmworkers. The CMM had long provided food, clinics, and recreation, but under Hartmire, the CMM increasingly supported farmworker organizing and opposed policies such as the Bracero Program.

Hartmire began collaborating with Fred Ross and César Chávez, supporting their organizing work with the Community Service Organization (CSO). By 1962, he was attending CSO conventions and staff retreats with Chávez, who viewed the ministry as a future ally once strikes and boycotts began.

== Support for César Chávez and the UFW ==
In 1965, when Filipino grape workers launched a strike in Delano, California, Chávez's largely Mexican-American union joined the effort. Hartmire and the CMM organized support for the strike among Protestant churches and laypeople across the United States. He later wrote that "The plight of the seasonal farm workers is a long-standing blot on the conscience of America."

At Chávez's request, Hartmire addressed the UFW’s founding convention in 1962 and later witnessed the unveiling of the iconic black-eagle banner. The CMM organized church participation in picket lines, consumer boycotts, and other forms of support for the UFW. Their activism, including involvement in the Delano grape strike, caused deep divisions in religious communities.

In 1971, the CMM’s work evolved into the National Farm Worker Ministry (NFWM), with Hartmire as its founding director. He stayed at NFWM until 1989, when differences with Chávez led to his departure.

== Later life ==
After leaving the UFW, Hartmire joined Loaves and Fishes in Sacramento, California, a nonprofit serving the unhoused. He helped organize a five-month sit-in and fast seeking shelter access for women and children. He also helped organize hospital workers in Southern California in 2008.

In retirement, Hartmire and his wife continued to advocate for fair wages for service workers at their retirement community, Pilgrim Place, in Claremont.

== Legacy and beliefs ==
Hartmire argued that Christians should work alongside poor and working-class people rather than limit their involvement to charitable service. "A servant joins with farmworkers to be of service to them rather than bringing them services such as food or toys," he said.

He was described by colleague Rev. Gene Boutilier as "a modern Christian revolutionary who spent his entire adult life focused on the needs of others." César Chávez credited Hartmire with helping secure religious support that sustained the farmworker movement.

== Personal life ==
Hartmire married Jane "Pudge" Eichner, his high school sweetheart, and they had four children. Jane Hartmire died on November 2, 2017.

== Death ==
Chris Hartmire died on December 18, 2022, at age 90, in Claremont, California, from congestive heart failure.
