= Cesar Chavez =

American civil rights activist (1927–1993)

- Chavez in 1979
- Born: Cesario Estrada Chavez; March 31, 1927; Yuma, Arizona, US
- Died: April 23, 1993 (aged 66); San Luis, Arizona, US
- Resting place: Cesar E. Chavez National Monument; Bakersfield, California
- Occupations: Labor leader; Civil rights activist
- Spouse: Helen Fabela (m. 1948)
- Children: 12
- Awards: Presidential Medal of Freedom (1994)
- Military career
- Branch: United States Navy
- Service years: 1944–1946

Cesario Estrada "Cesar" Chavez (Note: Pronunciation: /ˈtʃɑːvɛz/ Latin American Spanish: [ˈtʃaβes]) (March 31, 1927 – April 23, 1993) was an American labor unionist and political activist. Along with Dolores Huerta and Gilbert Padilla, he co-founded the National Farm Workers Association (NFWA), which later merged with the Agricultural Workers Organizing Committee (AWOC) to become the United Farm Workers (UFW). Ideologically, his worldview combined leftist approaches with Catholic social teaching.

Born in Yuma, Arizona, to a Mexican American family, Chavez began his working life as a manual laborer before spending two years in the US Navy. Relocating to California, where he married, he got involved in the Community Service Organization (CSO), through which he helped laborers register to vote. In 1959, he became the CSO's national director, a position based in Los Angeles. In 1962, he left the CSO to co-found the NFWA, based in Delano, California, through which he launched an insurance scheme, a credit union, and the El Malcriado newspaper for farmworkers. Later that decade, he began organizing strikes among farmworkers, most notably the successful Delano grape strike of 1965–1970. Amid the grape strike, his NFWA merged with Larry Itliong's AWOC to form the UFW in 1967. Influenced by the Indian independence leader Mahatma Gandhi, Chavez emphasized direct nonviolent resistance, including picketing and boycotting, to pressure farm owners into granting strikers' demands. He imbued his campaigns with Catholic symbolism, including public processions, Masses, and fasts. He received much support from labor and leftist groups but was monitored by the Federal Bureau of Investigation (FBI).

In the early 1970s, Chavez sought to expand the UFW's influence outside California by opening branches in other states. Viewing illegal immigrants as a major source of strikebreakers, he also pushed a campaign against illegal immigration into the US, which generated violence along the Mexico–United States border and caused schisms with many of the UFW's allies. Interested in cooperatives as a form of organization, he established a remote commune in Keene, California. His increased isolation and emphasis on unrelenting campaigning alienated many California farmworkers who had previously supported him, and by 1973 the UFW had lost most of the contracts and membership it won during the late 1960s. His alliance with California governor Jerry Brown helped ensure the passing of the California Agricultural Labor Relations Act of 1975, although the UFW's campaign to get its measures enshrined in the Constitution of California failed. Influenced by the Synanon religious organization, Chavez re-emphasized communal living and purged perceived opponents. Membership of the UFW dwindled in the 1980s, with Chavez refocusing on anti-pesticide campaigns and moving into real-estate development, generating controversy for his use of non-unionized laborers.

Posthumously, Chavez became both a revered and controversial figure. He became a "folk saint" among Mexican Americans, and an icon for organized labor and leftist groups in the US. His birthday was proclaimed a federal commemorative holiday in 2014 and is a state holiday in multiple states, many places are named after him, and he posthumously received the Presidential Medal of Freedom in 1994. UFW critics raised concerns about his autocratic control of the union, the purges of those he deemed disloyal, and the personality cult built around him, while farm owners considered him a communist subversive. In 2026, allegations surfaced that he sexually abused Huerta, other women, and minors, resulting in honorary tributes and celebrations being removed, renamed, or canceled.

== Early life ==
=== Childhood: 1927–1945 ===
Cesario Estrada Chavez was born in Yuma, Arizona, on March 31, 1927. He was named after his paternal grandfather, Cesario Chavez, a Mexican who had crossed into Texas in 1898. Cesario had established a successful wood haulage business near Yuma, and in 1906 bought a farm in the Sonora Desert's North Gila Valley. Cesario had brought his wife Dorotea and eight children with him from Mexico; the youngest, Librado, was Cesar's father.

Librado married Juana Estrada Chavez in the early 1920s. Born in Ascensión, Chihuahua, Mexico, she had crossed into the US with her mother as a baby. They lived in Picacho, California, before moving to Yuma, where Juana worked as a farm laborer and then an assistant to the chancellor of the University of Arizona.

Librado and Juana's first child, Rita, was born in August 1925, with their first son, Cesar, following nearly two years later. Chavez also had three younger siblings. In November 1925, Librado and Juana bought a series of buildings near the family home which included a pool hall, store, and living quarters. They soon fell into debt and were forced to sell these assets. By April 1929, they moved into the galera storeroom of Librado's parental home, then owned by the widowed Dorotea.

Chavez was raised in what his biographer Miriam Pawel called "a typical extended Mexican family"; she noted that they were "not well-off, but they were comfortable, well-clothed, and never hungry". The family spoke Spanish, and he was raised in adherence to the Catholic Church, with his paternal grandmother Dorotea largely overseeing his religious instruction. His mother Juana engaged in forms of folk Catholicism, being a devotee of Santa Eduviges. As a child, Chavez was nicknamed "Manzi" in reference to his fondness for manzanilla tea. To entertain himself, he played handball and listened to boxing matches on the radio. One of five children, he had two sisters, Rita and Vicki, and two brothers, Richard and Librado.

Cesario began attending Laguna Dam School in 1933; there, the speaking of Spanish was forbidden and Cesario was expected to change his name to Cesar. After Dorotea died in July 1937, the Yuma County local government auctioned off her farmstead to cover back taxes, and despite Librado's delaying tactics, the house and land were sold in 1939. This was a seminal experience for Cesar, who regarded it as an injustice against his family, with the banks, lawyers, and Anglo-American power structure as the villains of the incident. Influenced by his Catholic beliefs, he increasingly came to see the poor as a source of moral goodness in society.

The Chavez family joined the growing number of American migrants who were moving to California amid the Great Depression. First working as avocado pickers in Oxnard and then as pea pickers in Pescadero, the family made it to San Jose, where they first lived in a garage in the city's impoverished Mexican district. They moved regularly, and on weekends and holidays, Cesar joined his family in working as an agricultural laborer. In California, he moved schools many times, spending the longest time at Miguel Hidalgo Junior School; here, his grades were generally average, although he excelled at mathematics. At school, he faced ridicule for his poverty, while more broadly, he experienced anti-Latino prejudice from many European-Americans, with many establishments refusing to serve non-white customers. He graduated from junior high in June 1942, after which he left formal education and became a full-time farm laborer.

=== Early adulthood: 1946–1953 ===
In 1944, Chavez enlisted in the US Navy, and was sent to Naval Training Center San Diego. In July, he was stationed at the US base in Saipan, and six months later moved to Guam, where he was promoted to the rank of seaman first class. He was then stationed to San Francisco, where he decided to leave the Navy, receiving an honorable discharge in 1946. Relocating to Delano, California, where his family had settled, he returned to working as an agricultural laborer.

In 1947, Chavez joined the National Farm Labor Union (NFLU), which, until its 1947 affiliation with the American Federation of Labor, was the Southern Tenant Farmers Union (STFU). (Later, the NFLU became the National Agricultural Workers Union.) That year, he was picketing cotton fields in Corcoran, near Delano, for the NFLU. The union had called a strike against the DiGiorgio grape fields in 1947. As in the STFU's strikes against cotton plantations in Arkansas, strikers formed "caravans" and marched around the perimeter of the DiGiorgio property, asking its workers to join them. Chavez led one of those caravans.

Chavez entered a relationship with Helen Fabela, who soon became pregnant. They married in Reno, Nevada, in October 1948; it was a double wedding, with Chavez's sister Rita marrying her fiancé at the same ceremony. By early 1949, Chavez and his new wife had settled in the Sal Si Puedes neighborhood of San Jose, where many of his other family members were now living. Their first child, Fernando, was born there in February 1949; a second, Sylvia, followed in February 1950; and then a third, Linda, in January 1951. The latter had been born shortly after they had relocated to Crescent City, where Chavez was employed in the lumber industry. They then returned to San Jose, where Chavez worked as an apricot picker and then as a lumber handler for the General Box Company.

There, he befriended two social justice activists, Fred Ross and Father Donald McDonnell, both European-Americans whose activism was primarily within the Mexican-American community. Chavez helped Ross establish a chapter of his Community Service Organization (CSO) in San Jose, and joined him in voter registration drives. He was soon voted vice president of the CSO chapter. He also helped McDonnell construct the first purpose-built church in Sal Si Puedes, the Our Lady of Guadalupe church, which opened in December 1953. In turn, McDonnell lent Chavez books, encouraging the latter to develop a love of reading. Among the books were biographies of the saint Francis of Assisi, the US labor organizers John L. Lewis and Eugene V. Debs, and the Indian independence activist Mahatma Gandhi, introducing Chavez to the ideas of nonviolent protest.

== Early activism ==
=== Working for the Community Service Organization: 1953–1962 ===
In late 1953, Chavez was laid off by the General Box Company. Ross then secured funds so that the CSO could employ Chavez as an organizer, traveling around California setting up other chapters. In this job, he traveled across Decoto, Salinas, Fresno, Brawley, San Bernardino, Madera, and Bakersfield. Many of the CSO chapters fell apart after Ross or Chavez ceased running them, and to prevent this Saul Alinsky advised them to unite the chapters, of which there were over twenty, into a self-sustaining national organization. In late 1955, Chavez returned to San Jose to rebuild the CSO chapter there so that it could sustain an employed full-time organizer. To raise funds, he opened a rummage store, organized a three-day carnival and sold Christmas trees, although often made a loss.

In early 1957, he moved to Brawley to rebuild the chapter there. His repeated moving meant that his family were regularly uprooted; he saw little of his wife and children, and was absent for the birth of his sixth child. Chavez grew increasingly disillusioned with the CSO, believing that middle-class members were becoming increasingly dominant and were pushing its priorities and allocation of funds in directions he disapproved of; he for instance opposed the decision to hold the organization's 1957 convention in Fresco's Hacienda Hotel, arguing that its prices were prohibitive for poorer members. Amid the wider context of the Cold War and McCarthyite suspicions that leftist activism was a front for Marxist-Leninist groups, the Federal Bureau of Investigation (FBI) began monitoring Chavez and opened a file on him.

At Alinsky's instigation, the United Packinghouse Workers of America (UPWA) paid $20,000 to the CSO for the latter to open a branch in Oxnard; Chavez became its organizer, working with the largely Mexican farm laborers. In Oxnard, Chavez worked to encourage voter registration. He repeatedly heard concerns from local Mexican-American laborers that they were being routinely passed over or fired so that employers could hire cheaper Mexican guest workers, or braceros, in violation of federal law. To combat this practice, he established the CSO Employment Committee that launched a "registration campaign" through which unemployed farm workers could sign their name to highlight their desire for work.

I guess the best thing is to keep organizing new groups until they become rotten with personalities, then just move over and begin another group. I really don't know. The only one suggestion I have is to make sure there is always one person who is in charge... I think this way the work of the group moves forward always.

— Cesar Chavez, on avoiding the pitfalls of the CSO

The Committee targeted its criticism at Hector Zamora, the director of the Ventura County Farm Labor Association, who controlled most of the jobs in the area. It used sit-ins of workers to raise the profile of their cause, a tactic also used by proponents of the civil rights movement in the southern US at that time. It had some success in getting companies to replace braceros with unemployed Americans. Its campaign also ensured that federal officials began properly investigating complaints about the use of braceros and received assurances from the state farm placement service that they would seek out unemployed Americans rather than automatically hiring bracero labor. In May, the Employment Committee was formerly transferred from the CSO to the UPWA.

In 1959, Chavez moved to Los Angeles to become the CSO's national director. He, his wife, and now eight children settled into the largely Mexican neighborhood of Boyle Heights. He found the CSO's financial situation was bad, with even his own salary in jeopardy. He laid off several organizers to keep the organization afloat. He tried to organize a life insurance scheme among CSO members to raise funds, but this project failed to materialize.

Under Chavez, the CSO secured financing from wealthier donors and organizations, usually to finance specific projects for a set period of time. The California American Federation of Labor and Congress of Industrial Organizations (AFL-CIO) for instance paid it $12,000 to conduct voter registration schemes in six counties with high Mexican populations. The wealthy benefactor Katy Peake then offered it $50,000 over three years to organize California's farm workers. Under Chavez's leadership, the CSO assisted the successful campaign to get the government to extend the state pension to non-citizens who were permanent residents. At the ninth annual CSO convention in March 1962, Chavez resigned.

=== Founding the National Farm Workers Association: 1962–1965 ===
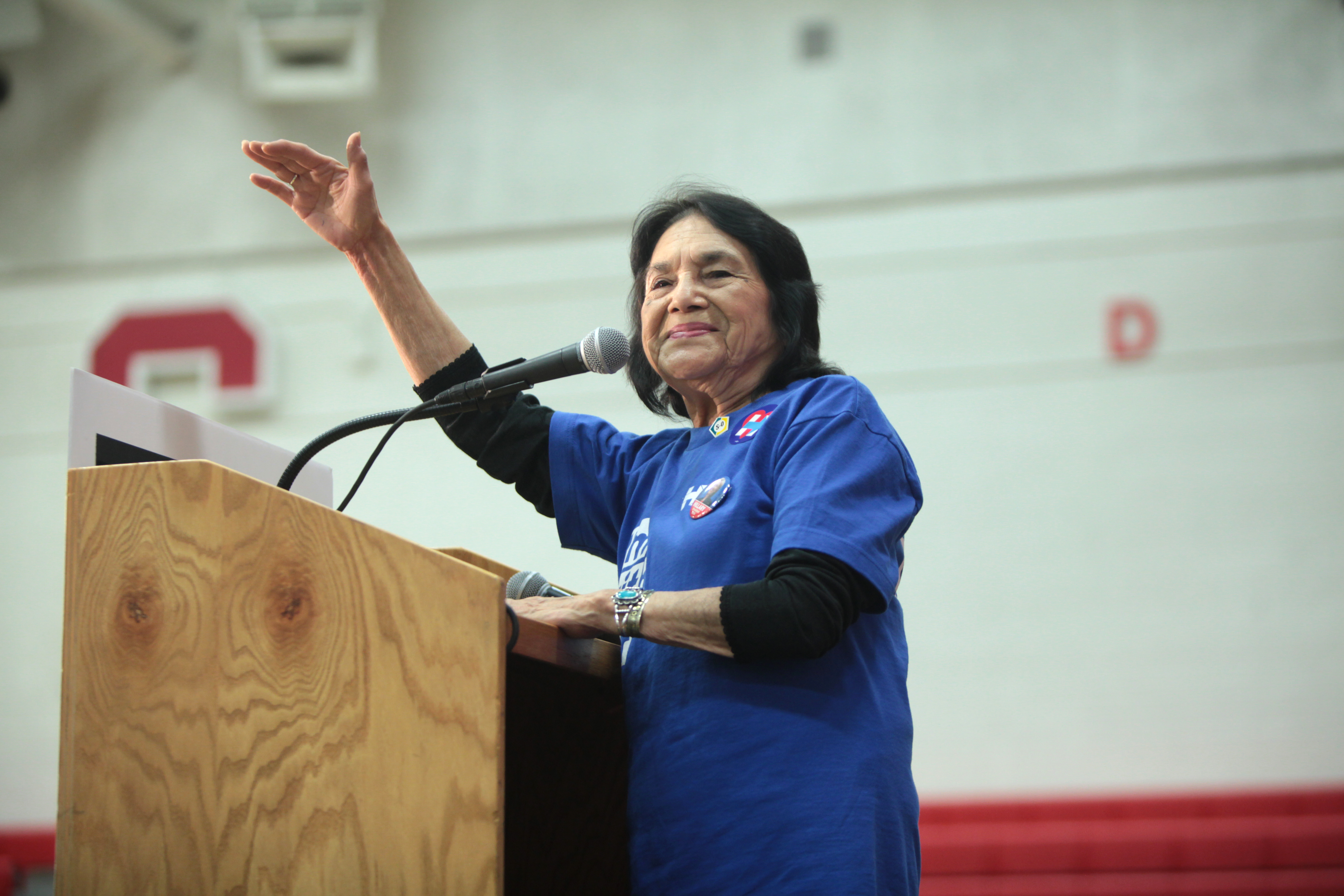
Dolores Huerta, pictured in 2016, was a key ally of Chavez's in his formation of the NFWA.

In April 1962, Chavez and his family moved to Delano, California, an agricultural community in the southern San Joaquin Valley, where they rented a house on Kensington Street. He was intent on forming a labor union for farm workers but, to conceal this aim, told people that he was simply conducting a census of farm workers to determine their needs. He began devising the National Farm Workers Association (NFWA), referring to it as a "movement" rather than a trade union.

He was aided in this project by his wife and by Dolores Huerta; according to Pawel, Huerta became his "indispensable, lifelong ally". Other key supporters of his project were the Reverend Jim Drake and other members of the California Migrant Ministry; although as a Catholic, Chavez was initially suspicious of these Protestant preachers, he came to view them as key allies.

Chavez spent his days traveling around the San Joaquin Valley, meeting with workers and encouraging them to join his association. At the time, he lived off a combination of unemployment benefit, his wife's wage as a farmworker, and donations from friends and sympathizers. On September 30, 1962, he formalized the Association at a convention in Fresno. There, delegates elected Chavez as the group's general-director. They also agreed that, once the association had a life insurance policy up and running, members would start paying monthly dues of $3.50. The group adopted the motto "viva la causa" ("long live the cause") and a flag featuring a black eagle on a red and white background. At the organization's constitutional convention held in Fresno in January 1963, Chavez was elected president, with Huerta, Julio Hernandez, and Gilbert Padilla its vice presidents.

The flag adopted by the NFWA at its launch in 1962

Chavez wanted to control the NFWA's direction and to that end ensured that the role of the group's officers was largely ceremonial, with control of the group being primarily in the hands of the staff, headed by himself. At the NFWA's second convention, held in Delano in 1963, Chavez was retained as its general director while the role of the presidency was scrapped. That year, he began collecting membership dues, before establishing an insurance policy for FWA members. Later in the year he launched a credit union for NFWA members, having gained a state charter after the federal government refused him one. The NFWA attracted volunteers from other parts of the country. One of these, Bill Esher, became editor of the group's newspaper, El Malcriado, which soon after launching increased its print run from 1,000 to 3,000 to meet demand.

The NFWA was initially based out of Chavez's house although in September 1964 it moved its headquarters to an abandoned Pentecostal church in Albany Street, West Delano. During its second full year in operation the association more than doubled both its income and its expenditures. As it became more secure, it began to plan for its first strike. In April 1965, rose grafters approached the organization and requested help in organizing their strike for better working conditions. The strike targeted two companies, Mount Arbor and Conklin. Aided by the NFWA, the workers struck on May 3, and after four days the growers agreed to raise wages, after which the strikers returned to work. Following this success, Chavez's reputation began to filter through leftist activist circles across California.

== Delano Grape Strike ==
=== Start of the Delano Grape Strike: 1965–1966 ===
In September 1965, Filipino American farm workers, organized by the Agricultural Workers Organizing Committee (AWOC), initiated the Delano grape strike to protest for higher wages. Chavez and his largely Mexican American supporters voted to support them. The strike covered an area of over 400 square miles (1,000 km^{2}); Chavez divided the picketers among four quadrants, each with a mobile crew led by a captain. As the picketers urged those who continued to work to join them on strike, the growers sought to provoke and threaten the strikers. Chavez insisted that the strikers must never respond with violence.

The picketers also protested outside strike-breakers' homes, with the strike dividing many families and breaking friendships. Police monitored the protests, photographing many of those involved; they also arrested various strikers. To raise support for those arrested, Chavez called for donations at a speech in Berkeley's Sproul Plaza in October; he received over $1,000. Many growers considered Chavez a communist, and the FBI launched an investigation into both him and the NFWA.

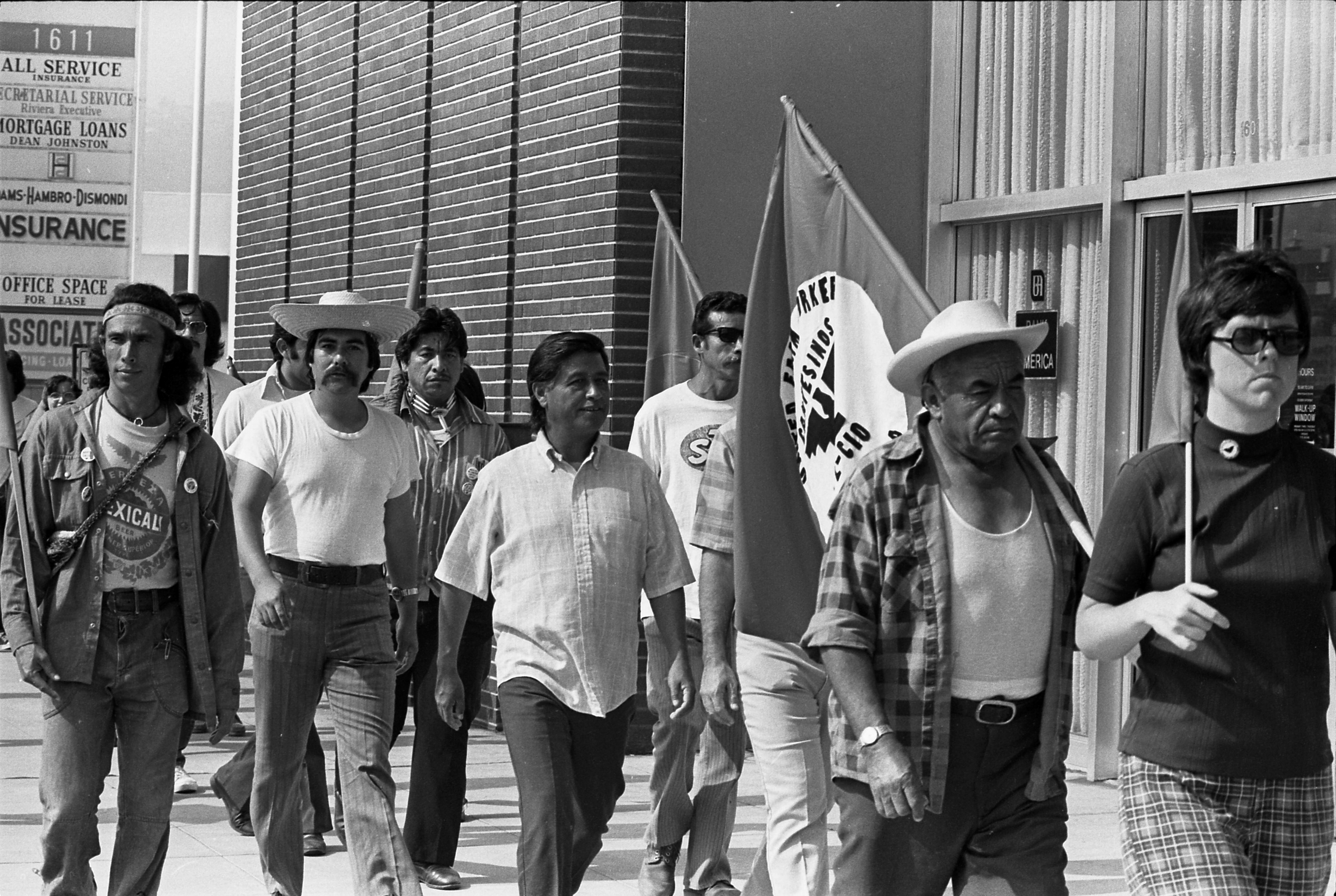
Cesar Chavez (center) on a march from the Mexican border to Sacramento with United Farm Workers members in Redondo Beach, California, July 1975

In December, the United Automobile Workers (UAW) president Walter Reuther joined Chavez in a pro-strike protest march through Delano. This was the first time that the strike attracted national media attention. Reuther then pledged that the UAW would donate $5,000 a month to be shared between the AWOC and NFWA. Chavez also met with representatives of the Student Nonviolent Coordinating Committee (SNCC), which became an important ally of the strikers. Influenced by the civil rights movement's successful use of boycott campaigns, Chavez decided to launch his own, targeting companies which owned Delano vineyards or sold grapes grown there. The first target selected, in December 1965, was the Schenley liquor company, which owned one of the area's smaller vineyards. Chavez organized pickets to take place in other cities where Schenley's grapes were being delivered for sale.

By 1965, Chavez was aware that the numbers joining the picket lines had declined; although hundreds of pickers had initially struck, some had returned to their jobs, found employment elsewhere, or moved away from Delano. To keep the pickets going, Chavez invited left-wing activists from elsewhere to join them; many, particularly university students, came from the San Francisco Bay Area. Recruitment was fueled by coverage of the strike in the SNCC's newspaper, The Movement, and the Marxist People's World newspaper. By late fall 1966, a protest camp had formed in Delano, opening its own medical clinic and children's nursery. Protesters were entertained by Luis Valdez's El Teatro Campesino, which put on skits with a political message. Within the protest movement there were some tensions between the striking farm-workers and the influx of student radicals.

The National Farm Workers Association (NFWA) (Note: Later to merge with the AWOC to become the United Farm Workers) 1965 rent strike in response to the Tulare County Housing Authority raising their rents.

=== Growing success: 1966–1967 ===
WE SHALL OVERCOME. Across the San Joaquin Valley, across California, across the entire Southwest of the United States, wherever there are Mexican people, wherever there are farm workers, our movement is spreading like flames across [a] dry plain. Our PILGRIMAGE is the MATCH that will light our cause for all farm workers to see what is happening here, so that they may do as we have done. The time has come for the liberation of the poor farm worker. History is on our side. MAY THE STRUGGLE GO ON! VIVA LA CAUSA!

— Luis Valdez's "Plan de Delano", read aloud at each stop along Chavez's march to Sacramento

In March 1966, the United States Senate Committee on Labor and Public Welfare's Subcommittee on Migratory Labor held three hearings in California. The third, which took place in Delano, was attended by Senator Robert F. Kennedy, who toured a labor camp with Chavez and addressed a mass meeting. As the strike began to flag in winter, Chavez decided on a march of 300 miles (480 km) to the state capitol at Sacramento. This would pass through dozens of farmworker communities and attract attention for their cause. In March, the procession started out with about fifty marchers who left Delano.

Chavez imbued the march with Catholic significance. Marchers carried crucifixes and a banner of the Virgin of Guadalupe and used the slogan "Peregrinación, Penitencia, Revolución" ("Pilgrimage, Penitence, Revolution"). Portraying the march as an act of penance, he argued that the image of his personal suffering—his feet became painful and for part of the journey he had to walk with a cane—would be useful for the movement. At each stop, they read aloud a "Plan de Delano" written by Valdez, deliberately echoing the "Plan de Ayala" of Mexican revolutionary Emiliano Zapata. At Easter, the marchers arrived in Sacramento, where over 8,000 people amassed in front of the state capitol. Chavez briefly addressed the crowd.

During the march, Chavez had been approached by Schenley's lawyer, Sidney Korshak. They agreed to contract negotiations within 60 days. Chavez then declared an end to the Schenley boycott; instead, the movement would switch the boycott to the DiGiorgio Corporation, a major Delano land owner. DiGiorgio then called an election among their vineyard workers, hoping to challenge the NFWA's influence. A more conservative union, the International Brotherhood of Teamsters, was competing against the NFWA in the DiGiorgio workers' election.

After DiGiorgio altered the terms of the election to benefit a Teamster victory, Chavez removed the NFWA from the ballot and urged his supporters to abstain. When the vote took place in June 1966, nearly half of eligible workers abstained, allowing a Teamster victory. Chavez then appealed to Pat Brown, the Governor of California, to intervene. Brown agreed, wanting the endorsement of the Mexican American Political Association. He declared the DiGiorgio election invalid and called for an August rerun to be supervised by the American Arbitration Association.

On September 1, Chavez's union was declared the victor in the second election. DiGiorgio subsequently largely halted grape production in Delano. The focus then shifted to Giumarra, the largest grape grower in the San Joaquin Valley. In August 1967, Chavez announced a strike against them followed by a boycott of their grapes.

An agreement was reached that Chavez's NFWA would merge with the AWOC, resulting in a new United Farm Workers Organizing Committee (UFWOC). AWOC's Larry Itliong became the new group's assistant director, although soon felt marginalized by Chavez. UFWOC was also made an organizing committee of the AFL-CIO; this ensured that it would become a formal part of the US labor movement and would receive a monthly subsidy. Not all of Chavez's staff agreed with the merger; many of its more left-wing members mistrusted the growing links with organized labor, particularly due to the AFL-CIO's anti-communist views.

The UFWOC was plagued by ethnic divisions between its Filipino and Mexican members, although it continued to attract new volunteers. The majority of the volunteers were whites brought into the movement via left-wing and religious groups, or as part of social service internships. Chavez brought new people, such as LeRoy Chatfield, Marshall Ganz, and the lawyer Jerry Cohen, into his inner circle. His old friend Fred Ross also joined. Soon, the secretary–treasurer Antonio Orendain was left as the only Mexican migrant in the union's senior ranks.

In June 1967, Chavez launched his first purge of the union to remove those he deemed disruptive or disloyal to his leadership. His cover story was that he wanted to eject members of the Communist Party USA and related far-left groups, although the FBI's report at the time found no evidence of communist infiltration of the union. Some longstanding members, such as Esher, left because they disapproved of these purges. Tensions between Chavez and the Teatro had been building for some time; the Teatro's members were among those highly critical of the union's new links with the AFL-CIO. Chavez was concerned that the Teatro had become a rival to his prominent standing in the movement and was questioning his actions. Chavez asked the Teatro to disband, at which it split from the union and went on a tour of the US.

=== Forty Acres and public fasts: 1967–1968 ===
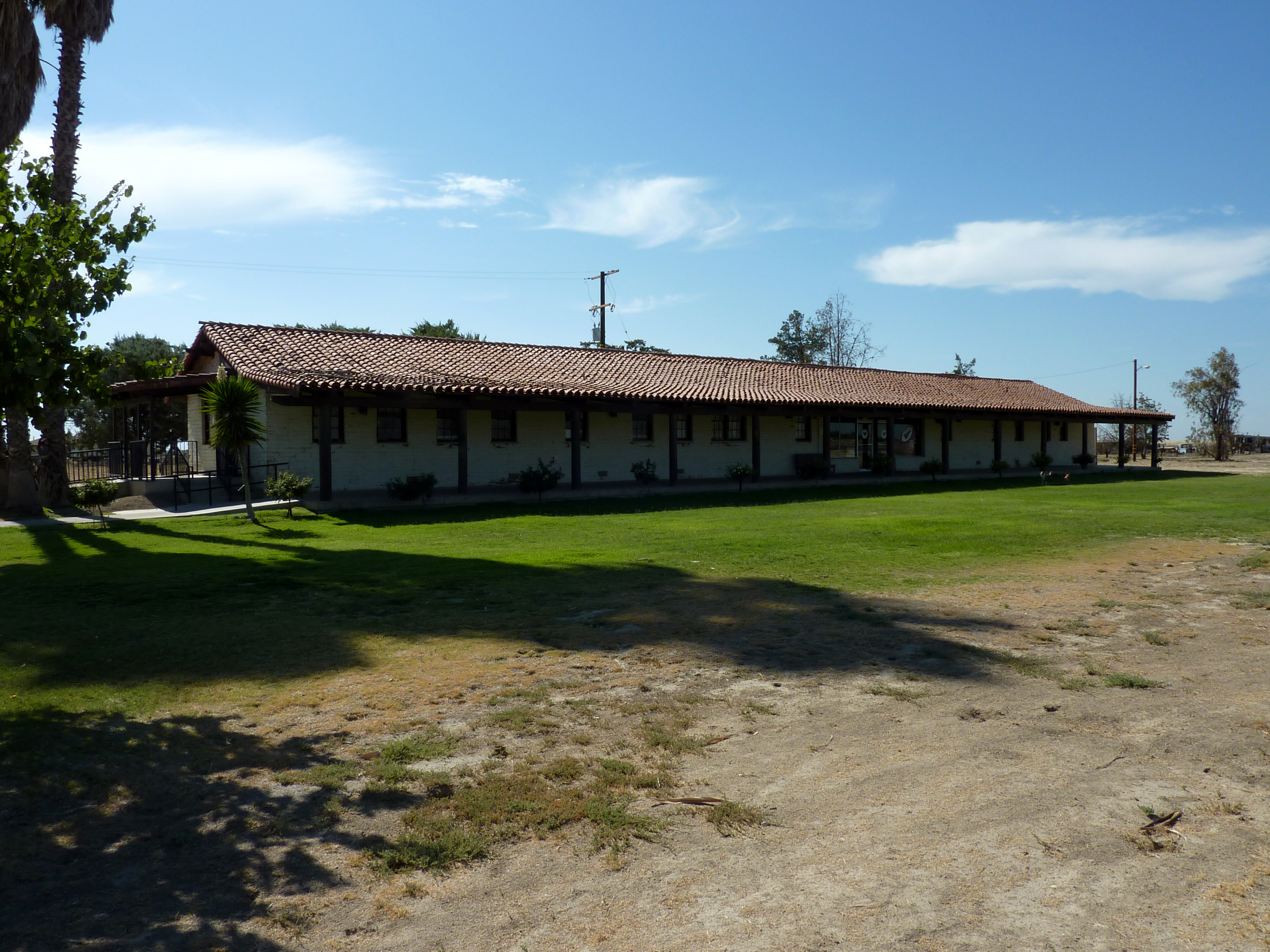
The Forty Acres complex in Delano, which Chavez established as his headquarters, was made a National Landmark in 2008.

The union purchased land known as The Forty Acres for their new headquarters. Chavez hoped for it to be a "spiritual" center where union members would relax; he designed it to have a swimming pool, a chapel, a market, and a gas station, as well as gardens with outdoor sculptures. He wanted the main building to be decorated inside with Gandhi quotations in English and Spanish. Meanwhile, Chavez was increasingly concerned that his supporters might turn to violence. Members had engaged in the destruction of property, something they regarded as not breaching the movement's ethos on non-violence.

Chavez's cousin Manuel had tampered with refrigerator units on trains, so that grapes being shipped out of Delano spoiled before reaching their destination; Chavez noted that "He's done all the dirty work for the union. There's a lot of fucking dirty work, and he did it all." In February 1968, the Giumarra company obtained a contempt citation against the union, stating that its members had used threatening and intimidating behavior against its employees and had placed roofing nails at the entrances to its ranches.

In February 1968, Chavez began a fast; he publicly stated that in doing so he was reaffirming his commitment to peaceful protest and presented it as a form of penance. He stated that he would remain at Forty Acres for the duration of his fast, which at this point had only a gas station there. Many members of the union were critical of what they saw as a stunt; Itliong was annoyed that Chavez had not consulted the union's board before making his declaration. The union introduced a motion urging Chavez to cancel his plan, although this failed.

Father Mark Day announced that a Mass would be held every night at Forty Acres. These attracted many of Chavez's supporters, with the gas station decorated as an impromptu shrine. Sympathetic Protestant clergy and Jewish rabbis also spoke at these Masses. After three weeks, Chavez's doctors urged him to end the fast. He agreed to do so at a public event on March 10. He invited Robert Kennedy to be the guest of honor at this event. Kennedy arrived at the event, which was attended by thousands of observers as well as the national press, and there they shared bread.

You stand today as a living example of the Gandhian tradition with its great force for social progress and its healing spiritual powers. My colleagues and I commend you for your bravery, salute you for your indefatigable work against poverty and injustice, and pray for your health and your continuing service as one of the outstanding men of America.

— Martin Luther King's telegram to Chavez after the latter announced his fast in February 1968

Not long after, Kennedy announced his candidacy to be the Democratic Party's next presidential candidate. He asked Chavez to run as a delegate in the California primary. Throughout May, Chavez traveled across California, urging farmworkers and registered Democrats to back Kennedy. His activism was a contributing factor to Kennedy's victory in that state. It was at the victory celebration in Los Angeles, an event attended by Chavez, that Kennedy was assassinated on June 5. Chavez then attended Kennedy's New York funeral as a pallbearer. Kennedy's assassination came two months after that of Martin Luther King, generating growing concerns among the union that Chavez would also be targeted by those who opposed him.

In May, Chavez appeared on the Today television show and announced a boycott of all grapes produced in California. The boycotters' message was that consumers should avoid buying California grapes so that farmworkers would get better wages and working conditions. Supporters across the country picketed stores selling California grapes and disrupted annual meetings of several supermarket chains. Chavez hoped that by putting pressure on the supermarkets, they would pressure the grape growers to give in to strikers' demands. The growers hired a public relations firm to counteract the boycott, warning stores that if they gave in to the boycott, they would soon be faced with similar boycotts for many other products. The growers also turned to the newly elected Governor of California, Ronald Reagan, who in turn sought the support of the Teamsters.

Chavez's back pain worsened and in September 1968 he was hospitalized at O'Connor Hospital in San Jose. He followed this with a recuperation stay at St Anthony's Seminary in Santa Barbara. He returned home, but finding it too crowded moved in to Forty Acres. Due to a donation from the United Auto Workers, the union had erected an office and meeting hall there, with a trailer being used as a medical clinic; it was still far from Chavez's original vision. He used his image of physical suffering as a tactic in his cause, although some of his inner circle thought his pain to be at least partially psychosomatic.

By 1968, Chavez was a national celebrity. Journalists increasingly approached him for interviews; he granted particularly close access to Peter Matthiessen and Jacques E. Levy, both of whom wrote favorable books about him. In July 1969, Chavez's portrait appeared on the front of Time magazine. Within the union, personal loyalty to Chavez became increasingly important; tensions between him and Itliong grew.

=== End of the Grape Strike: 1969–1970 ===
In March 1969, the doctor Janet Travell visited Chavez and determined that fused vertebrae were the source of his back pain. She prescribed various exercises and other treatments which he found eased his pain. Between September and December, Chavez traveled the country in a Winnebago speaking at dozens of fundraisers and rallies for the grape boycott. At a speech in Washington, DC, he came out publicly against US involvement in the Vietnam War, a topic he had previously avoided speaking on, because his son Fernando had been arrested as a conscientious objector.

In the late 1970s, Chavez also sought to advance his control over the California Rural Legal Assistance (CRLA), a group which advocated for farmworkers. Chavez demanded that the CRLA make its staff available for union work and that it would allow the union's attorneys to decide which cases the CRLA would pursue. Under the leadership of Cruz Reynoso, a former Chavez ally, the CRLA refused. Pawel believed that these attempts reflected Chavez's desire to be seen as the only voice for farmworkers.

Chavez negotiated with Lionel Steinberg, a grape grower in the Coachella area. They signed contracts allowing Steinberg's products to be sold with a union logo on them, indicating that they would be exempt from the boycott. Other Coachella growers regarded Steinberg as a traitor for negotiating with Chavez but ultimately followed suit, resulting in contracts being signed with the union. In July 1969, the Delano growers agreed to negotiate. Chavez insisted that their negotiations also cover issues at the Delano High School, where several pupils, including his own daughter Eloise, had been suspended or otherwise disciplined for protesting in support of the boycott. On July 29, 1970, the Delano growers signed contracts with the union at the Forty Acres Hall, in front of press. These contracts agreed to wage rises for pickers, the introduction of a health plan, and new safety measures regarding the use of pesticides on the crop.

== Later activism ==
=== Salinas Lettuce Strike: 1970–1971 ===
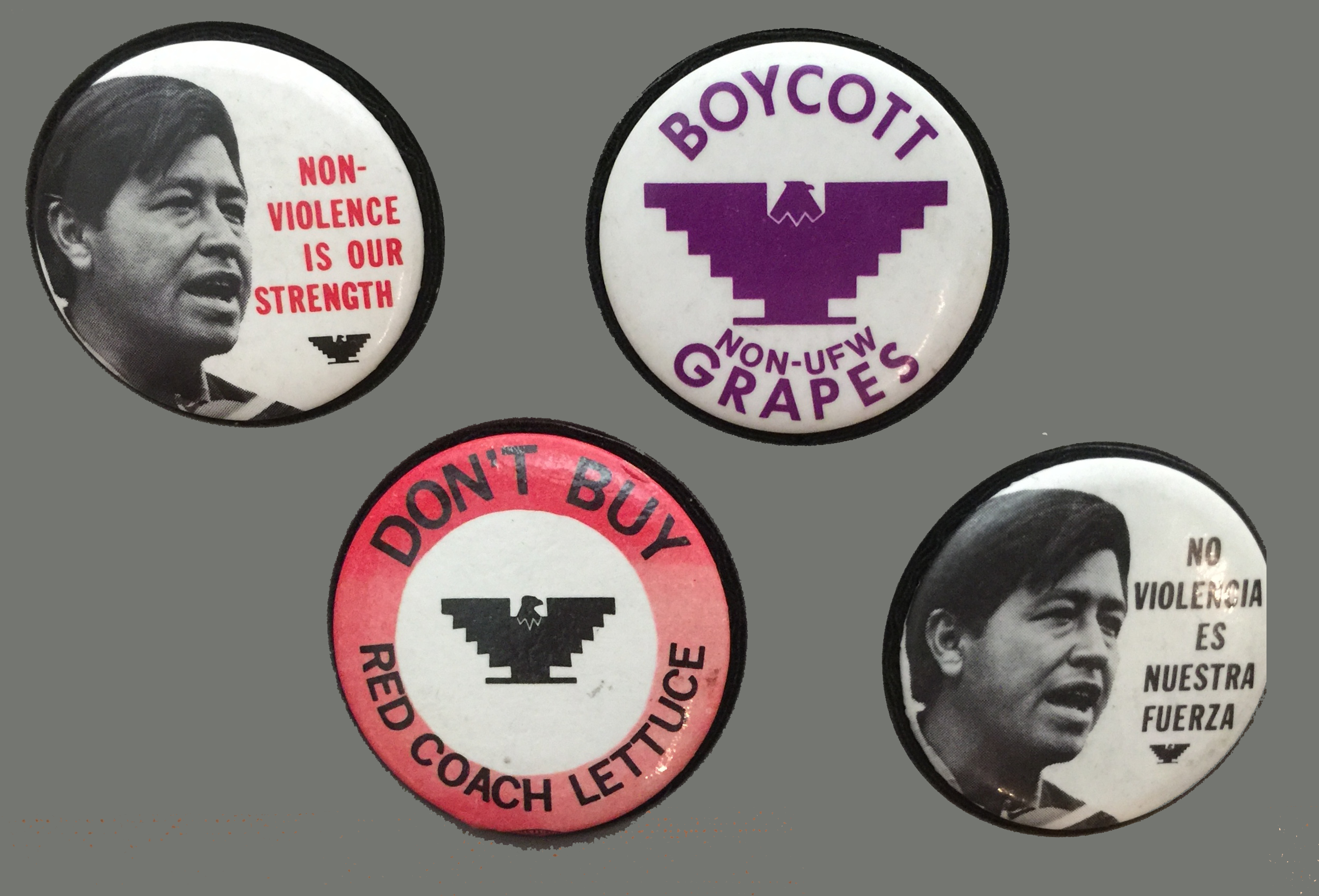
National Farm Workers Association buttons advertising their campaigns

In July 1970, the Grower-Shipper Association, representing lettuce-growing companies in California's Salinas Valley, renegotiated its contracts with the Teamsters, allowing the latter union to represent their employees. Chavez was angry at this, traveling to Salinas to talk with the lettuce cutters, many of whom were dissatisfied with the way that the Teamsters represented them. In August, thousands of cutters marched into Salinas, converging at Hartnell College where Chavez addressed them.

Rallying against the Teamsters, he emphasized that their union was run by white people, in contrast to the largely non-white makeup of the lettuce cutters. There, the cutters voted to go on strike. Over the coming days, many of them joined the UFW. Chavez decided that the strike should initially target the valley's largest lettuce grower, Interharvest, which was owned by the United Fruit Company. Seeking to avoid industrial action, the Teamsters set up a meeting with Chavez, where they eventually reached an agreement. The Teamsters agreed to relinquish their contracts with the Grower-Shipper Association, opening the way for the Salinas lettuce cutters to choose the UFW as their representative.

The Salinas lettuce growers secured a temporary restraining order preventing a strike, at which Chavez initiated another protest fast. Amid a ten-day truce, he reached an agreement with Interharvest but not the other Salinas growers. Thus, the strike against them began on August 24, when cutters started picketing the lettuce fields. Lettuce production slumped by three quarters and prices of lettuces doubled. Restraining orders were issued against the picketers, and when they broke them they were fined. The UFW paid many of these, as well as financially supporting the strikers in other ways. This proved expensive for the union, and Chavez decided that the pickets could not be maintained. Instead he decided to switch towards a boycott of Salinas lettuce. Chavez selected the Bud Antle company as the first target of the boycott campaign.

Bud Antle secured an injunction legally preventing a boycott against them, but Chavez continued regardless. Due to this, Chavez was charged, found guilty of contempt of court, and sentenced to ten days imprisonment in the Monterey County jail. During Chavez's imprisonment, supporters held a round-the-clock vigil outside the jail. Among those who visited him were Martin Luther King's widow Coretta Scott King, and Robert Kennedy's widow, Ethel Kennedy. She took part in a rally which included a Catholic Mass; it was opposed by a group of local counter-protesters who opposed the concentration of leftist activism in their community. These events attracted national media attention. Soon after, the California Supreme Court voted to dissolve key aspects of Bud Antle's injunction and ordered Chavez's release.

Chavez wanted a more remote base for his movement than Forty Acres, especially one where he could experiment with his ideas about communal living. To this end, the Hollywood movie producer Edward Lewis, a wealthy supporter of Chavez's, fronted the purchase of an old tuberculosis sanatorium in Keene, along the foothills of the Tehachapi Mountains, for the union. Chavez named this new base Nuestra Señora Reina de la Paz ("Our Lady Queen of Peace"), although it became commonly known just as "La Paz". Renovating the existing buildings, he invited various families to come and live there.

In creating this commune, he drew on Gandhi's experiments with ashrams in India. He envisioned it as a retreat center where workers could come for three-day retreats modeled on the Catholic cursillo. La Paz became the union's new headquarters, something that various backers and funders were critical of due to its remote location; Chavez said that this was necessary for his security, particularly following allegations of a plot against his life. At night, the perimeter of the commune was patrolled by armed guards. The organization at La Paz was often chaotic, with frustrated detractors in the movement referring to it as "Magic Mountain". Amid his growing frustrations with Chavez's leadership, Itliong resigned in October 1971.

=== Expanding beyond California: 1972 ===
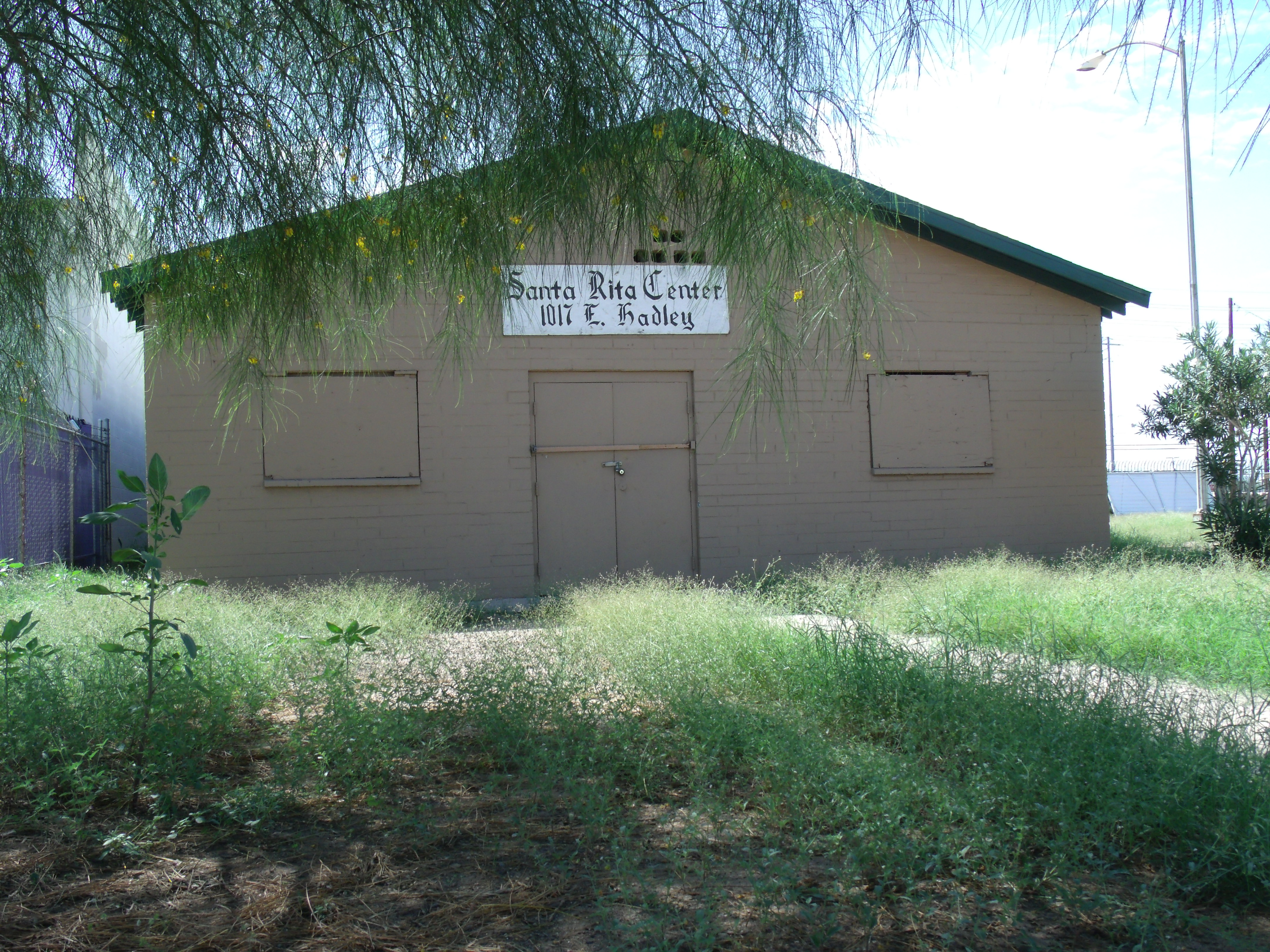
The Santa Rita Hall was used as a meeting place for a local Chicano group. Chavez undertook his Arizona fast there.

Arizona became the first state to pass a bill that was designed to keep the UFW out of their state; this would criminalize boycotts and make union elections among farm-workers almost impossible. In response, Chavez drove to Arizona and demanded a meeting with Governor Jack Williams, who refused. They subsequently launched a campaign to gain a recall election to remove Williams from office. This started the UFW's first major farm-worker campaign outside California. Farmworkers rallied outside Williams' office while Chavez embarked on a fast in the Santa Rita Center, a hall used by a local Chicano group.

On the nineteenth day of his fast, Chavez was hospitalized. He then broke the fast at a memorial Mass on the anniversary of Robert Kennedy's death, where he was joined by the folk singer Joan Baez. It was during the Arizona campaign that Dolores Huerta introduced the slogan "Sí se puede" ("Yes it can be done" or "Yes you/we can"), which the UFW used as a rallying cry and later as its official motto.

Chavez increasingly pushed for the UFW to become a national organization, with a token presence being established in Washington, Oregon, Idaho, Texas, and Florida. Parts of the union expressed concern that it was now overstretching its resources. Chavez also pushed for the California Migrant Ministry, which supported the UFW, to transform into a National Farm Worker Ministry (NFWM), insisting that the UFW should have the power to veto decisions made by the NFWM.

At the AFL-CIO's request, Chavez had suspended the Salinas lettuce boycott, but prepared to relaunch it eight months later as the growers had conceded to only one of their demands. Tensions grew between the UFW and AFL-CIO, with the latter's president George Meany concerned that if the UFW broke the law by extending its boycott to cover supermarket chains then the AFL-CIO could be held liable. As a result, Chavez formally requested a charter so that the UFW could become an independently chartered union separate from the AFL-CIO; he was loath to do so as it meant losing the AFL-CIO's subsidy.

While Chavez had been focusing on Salinas, his brother Richard had been tasked with overseeing the UFW's activities in Delano. In early 1972, Richard visited Chavez and confronted him about the problems in Delano, telling him that the union was losing support among farmworkers and that they were in danger of losing the contracts when they came up for renewal. In Richard's opinion, Chavez was losing touch with the union's membership. There was anger that members were expected to pay monthly dues to the union when their work was usually seasonal. There was also frustration at the union's $1-a-week voluntary fund to support the Salinas strikers.

Part of the membership thought that Chavez's new isolation at La Paz was leading him to take decisions unpopular with the farmworkers. There were concerns about the inept and inexperienced volunteers, mostly English-speaking European-Americans, who were running the UFW's hiring halls. Growers were complaining that these volunteers were often hostile and uncooperative. Union branches had been ordering members to miss work to engage in political rallies and Salinas picket lines, further angering growers. Chavez responded to these criticisms by reassigning his brother away from Delano. In late 1972, Richard and Huerta, his partner at the time, briefly left the UFW in frustration with Chavez's leadership. Other senior members continued to warn Chavez about the same issues that Richard did, but Chavez dismissed their concerns as grower propaganda.

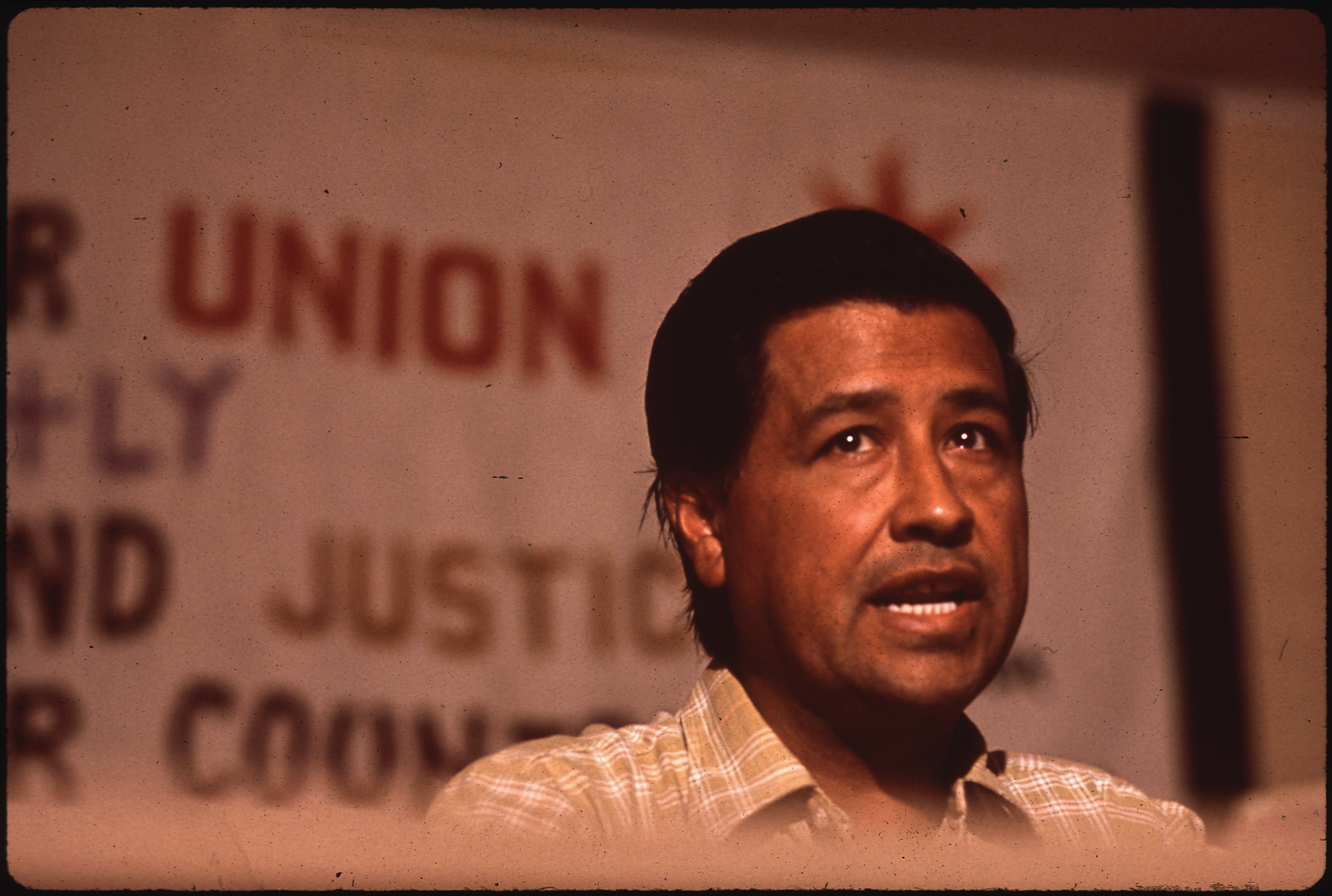
Chavez in 1972

California growers then organized a ballot on Proposition 22 for November 1972 which would ban boycott campaigns in the state. Chavez tasked LeRoy Chatfield with running the campaign against it. At the ballot, Proposition 22 lost by 58 percent to 42 percent. In April 1973, the UFW's contact with grape growers in the Delano area expired. At this, Chavez called a strike in the Coachella Valley. The Teamsters union saw this as an opportunity to replace the UFW in representing the region's farmworkers. The Teamsters organized counter-protests; their picketers were often armed and violent clashes between members of the two unions broke out.

The UFW used these instances of Teamster violence to rally public support for their cause. The AFL-CIO was concerned by this clash between unions, and Meany struck a deal with Chavez that they would provide the UFW with renewed financial support if it pushed for state legislation to govern the rights of farmworkers to organize. Chavez agreed; although he did not want such a law and he thought that Governor Reagan would never agree to it anyway. The AFL-CIO gave the UFW $1.6 million, allowing the UFW to pay Salinas picketers $75 and later $90 a week.

Amid the Delano strike, one of the UFW strikers, the Yemeni migrant Nagi Moshin Daifullah, died after an altercation with a police officer breaking up a bar-room fight. The UFW portrayed Daifullah as a martyr for the cause and over 5,000 people marched at his funeral, with Chavez fasting for three days. Chavez then called off the Delano strike, stating that he would do so until the federal government guaranteed the safety of UFW protesters. The government believed that this was a cover to conceal the financial problems that the strike was causing the UFW. By this point, the UFW had lost much of its membership, and most of its California contracts, to the Teamsters. Many farmworkers found that while the Teamsters appeared less interested in workers' rights, they did not expect their employees to spend their weekends on political campaigns and boycotts as the UFW did.

=== Immigration and legislative campaigns: 1973–1975 ===
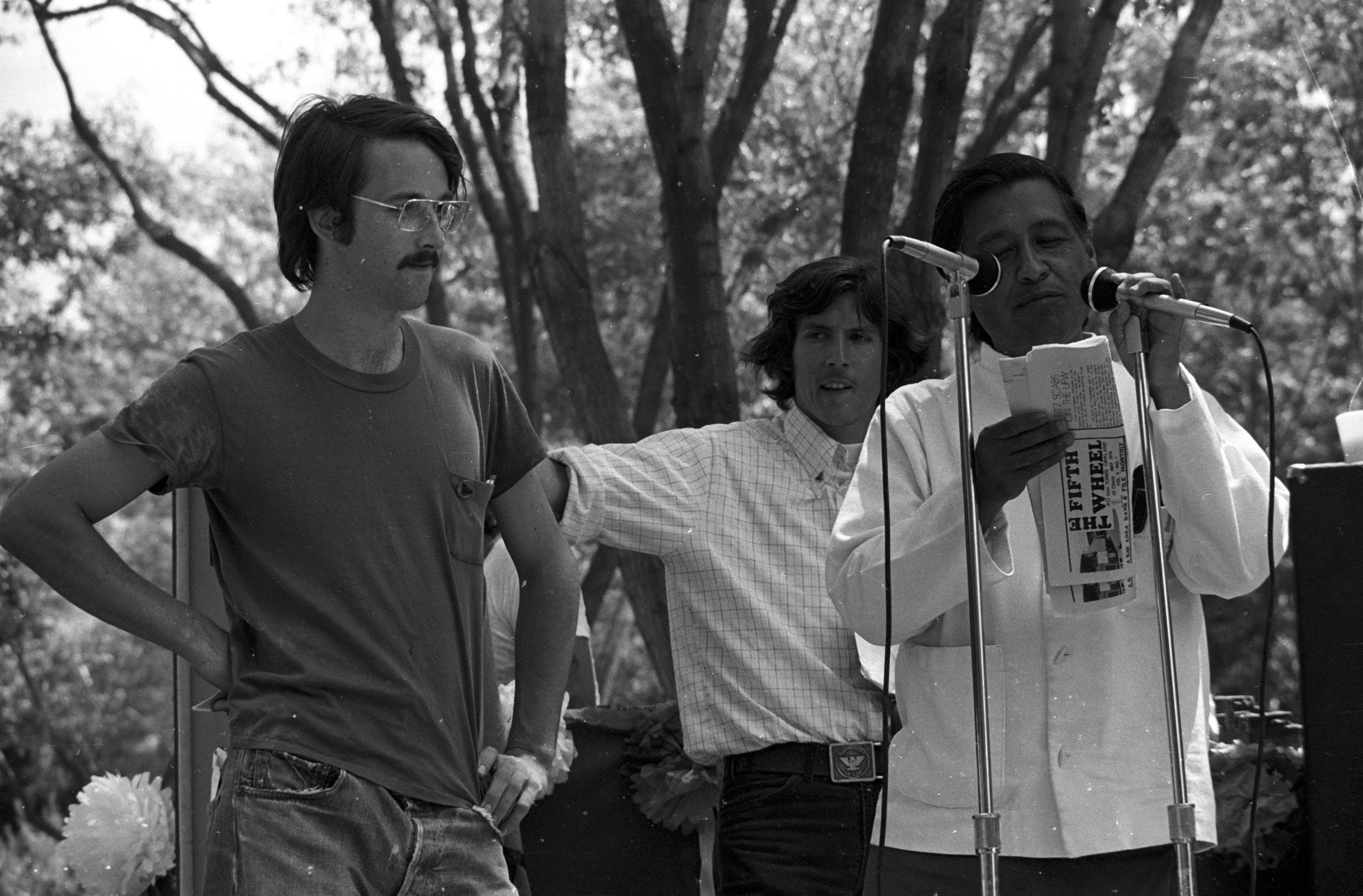
Chavez speaking at a 1974 UFW rally in Delano, California

In September 1973, the UFW's first constitutional convention was held in Fresno, representing the final step in the organization becoming a full union. A new constitution was announced that gave the group's president, a post occupied by Chavez, significant powers; he feared that greater democracy would paralyze the group. At the convention, the UFW agreed to scrap monthly membership fees in favor of charging members 2 percent of their annual income. It also announced that volunteers who had worked for the UFW for more than six months could become members with voting rights. Previously, membership had been restricted primarily to farmworkers. The new executive committee, which included Huerta and Richard Chavez, was racially mixed, although some members expressed dissatisfaction that it did not contain more Mexican Americans. By 1974, the UFW was again broke and its boycott was floundering. That year, The New York Times Magazine opened with a headline: "Is Chavez Beaten?". Chavez flew to Europe to urge the unions there to block the imported goods that the UFW were sending there. He traveled through London, Oslo, Stockholm, Geneva, Hamburg, Copenhagen, Brussels, and Paris, although he found that the unions were cautious about joining his campaign. In Rome, he met with Pope Paul VI, who commended his activism.

Chavez increasingly blamed the failure of the UFW strike on illegal immigrants who were brought in as strikebreakers. He made the unsubstantiated claim that the CIA was involved in part of a conspiracy to bring illegal migrants into the country so that they could undermine his union. He launched the "Illegals Campaign" to identify illegal migrants so that they could be deported, appointing Liza Hirsch to oversee the campaign. In Chavez's view, "if we can get the illegals out of California, we will win the strike overnight." This was a reiteration of an early view he expressed concerning the problems the UFW boycott faced in 1972. Chavez believed that any strike undertaken by agricultural workers could be undermined by "wetbacks" and "illegal immigrants". Huerta urged him not to refer to migrants who had come to the US illegally as "illegals" but Chavez refused, stating: "a spade's a spade." Some UFW field offices refused to collaborate with the campaign, and the National Lawyers Guild (NLG) refused to allow its interns to work on it, at which Chavez cut the UFW's links with the NLG.

Chavez pulled up to my Laurel Canyon house in an old car with a German shepherd dog named Huelga—Spanish for strike. We talked for several hours about whether the proposed state law or any labor law could actually help farm workers. Chavez repeatedly said that his boycott was a much better organizing tool because the law would always be corrupted by the powerful economic interests that control politics. I argued with him and said that a law would be his best protection. He finally agreed but remained skeptical.

— Jerry Brown on his relationship with Chavez

While Chavez had been in Europe, his cousin Manuel Chavez had established a UFW patrol, or "wet line", along Arizona's border with Mexico to stop illegal migrants crossing into the United States. There were rumors that this patrol was employing violence against these migrants, beating and robbing them and in one case castrating a man. These allegations soon appeared in the local press. A Mexican investigation determined that the UFW had bribed San Luis city officials to prevent them from interfering in these activities along the border. A Mexican union, the Confederation of Mexican Workers, broke its links with the UFW over the issue. Chavez dismissed the reports of violence as the smears of paid provocateurs, a claim which many of his supporters accepted. Chavez protected Manuel, while the executive board kept silent on his activities, regarding him as useful. The Chicano activist Bert Corona staged a protest against the UFW wet line, at which Chavez directed Jerry Cohen to launch an investigation into the funding of Corona's group.

In 1974, Chavez proposed the idea of a Poor People's Union with which he could reach out to poor white communities in the San Joaquin Valley who were largely hostile to the UFW. Meanwhile, the UFW announced that it would launch a boycott of the Gallo Wine company. In February 1975, the UFW organized a four-day march from San Francisco to the Gallo headquarters in Modesto, where a crowd of around 10,000 protesters amassed. The Modesto march had been a means of trying to rekindle the successes of the late 1960s and a public display of strength despite the setbacks that the UFW had experienced.

In November 1974, the Democratic Party's candidate, the modern liberal Jerry Brown, was elected governor of California. At this point, farm-worker's rights took center stage in the state's political agenda. Chavez met with Brown and together they developed a strategy: Brown would introduce a bill to improve farmworkers' rights, at which the UFW would support a more radical alternative. Brown would then negotiate a law with other stakeholders that included all the UFW's bottom lines. The purpose of this law would be to guarantee farmworkers the right to a secret ballot in which they could decide which union, if any, should represent them in their negotiations with their employer. Brown signed the California Agricultural Labor Relations Act (ALRA) into law in June 1975. This was widely seen as a UFW victory, as California now had the most favorable labor bill in the country. Chavez nevertheless worried that it would kill the movement's spirit, stating that the cause would now lose "the essential fight of recognition, which is the one that appeals to the human mind and the heart", instead focusing on more prosaic issues such as wages and benefits.

=== Proposition 14: 1976–1977 ===
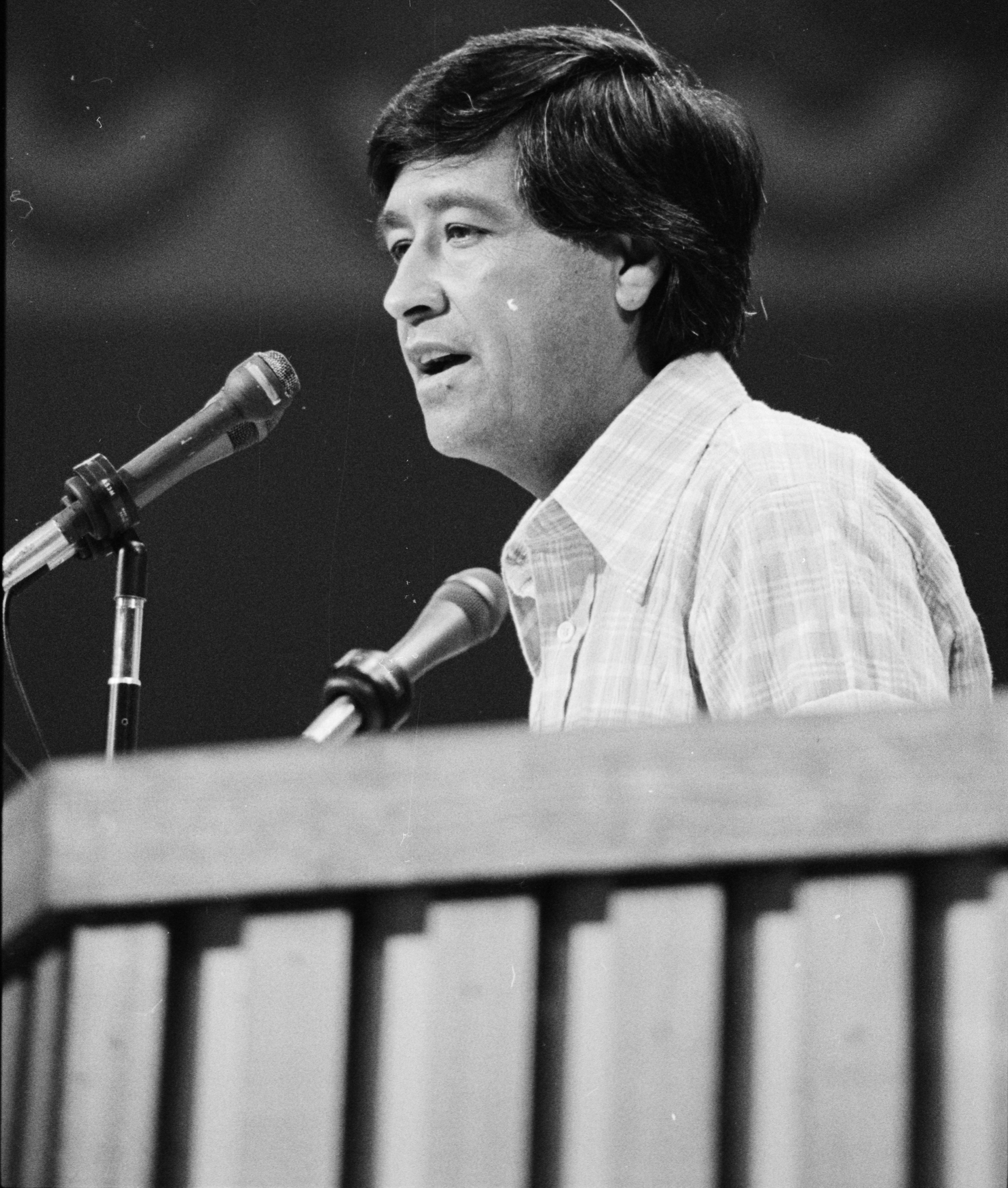
Chavez placing Jerry Brown's name for nomination during the roll call vote at the 1976 Democratic National Convention

The ALRA law created a state agency, the California Agricultural Labor Relations Board (ALRB), to oversee union elections among farmworkers. Brown appointed a five-person board to lead the ALRB which was sympathetic to Chavez; it included the former UFW official LeRoy Chatfield. As the UFW prepared for the elections in the fields, Chavez organized a "1000 mile march" from the San Diego border up the coast in July 1975. During the march, he stopped to attend the second UFW convention. For the campaign, the UFW hired 500 organizers, many of them farmworkers. The UFW won more elections than it lost, although in instances where it went head-to-head with the Teamsters, the latter beat the UFW. This indicated that the UFW's greatest strengths were among vegetable and citrus growers, rather than in their original heartlands of the Delano vineyards. The Teamster victories in the Delano vineyards angered Chavez, who insisted that there had not been free elections there. Chavez criticised the ALRB and launched a targeted campaign against Walter Kintz, the ALRB's general counsel, demanding his resignation. He also put pressure on Governor Brown to remove Kintz.

UFW organizers moved to follow their electoral victories by signing contracts with the growers; the UFW needed these contracts to stabilize its finances. Meanwhile, to develop the UFW's administration, Chavez hired the management consultant Crosby Milne, whose ideas led to a restructuring of the union. These reforms further centralized the union's powers among the executive committee. The changes involved decision-making powers being delegated from Chavez to the department heads, although Chavez—who liked to oversee everything personally—found this difficult to adhere to in practice. As part of these reforms, Chavez continued to call on the union's leaders to all relocate to La Paz, which many were reluctant to do. In July 1976, Chavez traveled to New York to attend the Democratic Party's National Congress, at which he gave a speech nominating Brown as the party's presidential candidate. Brown would come third in the contest, which would be won by Jimmy Carter. Carter went on to win the 1976 election, initiating an administration that was keen to fund UFW projects.

In 1976, the ALRB ran out of its budgeted money for the year. The California legislature refused to allocate more money, so the ALRB closed shop for the year. Seeking to get the farmworkers' rights introduced by ALRA enshrined in California's constitution, in early 1976 UFW activists put forward the idea of Proposition 14, which would go forward to the electorate later that year. Chavez thought that Proposition 14 had little chance of being passed by the electorate and was concerned that devoting its resources to the campaign would be financially costly for the UFW. Brown also warned them not to, arguing that it would backfire on farmworkers by polarizing communities. Despite these concerns, Fred Ross urged the union to take on the issue, and after much debate, the UFW's executive board voted to involve itself in the 'vote yes' campaign on Proposition 14. Growers responded with a well-funded multi-media campaign that emphasized the claim that the measure would give unions the right to trespass on private property. When it went to the electorate in November 1976, Proposition 14 was defeated by a measure of two-to-one. Although this defeat had little serious impact on the UFW, Chavez took it as a very public rejection of him personally.

Chavez blamed the defeat on the UFW's national boycott director, Nick Jones, who had been the only staff member to publicly voice disquiet over the Proposition 14 campaign. He said that Jones and the New York boycott director, Charlie March, had been part of a far-left conspiracy to undermine the UFW. Under pressure, in November 1976, Jones resigned; in a letter to the executive board he stated that he was "deeply concerned" about the direction in which Chavez was taking the union. Chavez also fired Joe Smith, the editor of El Malcriado, after accusing him of deliberately undermining the newspaper. He then ordered Ross and Ganz to interrogate everyone who worked on the campaign, ostensibly to decide on new assignments but also to route out alleged malcontents, agitators, and spies. Many of those involved in running the UFW's boycott expressed concerns about a McCarthyite-style atmosphere developing within the union, and Chavez's purge attracted press attention. As the criticisms of his leadership intensified, Chavez responded with further purges, inspired by those in China's Cultural Revolution. He became convinced that there was a far-left conspiracy, whose members he called the "assholes" or "them", who were trying to undermine the UFW. At a La Paz meeting in April 1977, later called "the Monday Night Massacre", Chavez called together a range of individuals whom he denounced as malcontents or spies. They were verbally abused by members of the executive board and ejected from the community. He later accused Philip Vera Cruz, the oldest member of the executive board, of also being part of the conspiracy, and forced him out.

Chavez reversed many of the changes he had implemented under Milne's guidance, with executive board members being reassigned to cover geographic areas rather than having union-wide responsibilities. Milne, who had been living at La Paz, soon left, with Chavez later alleging he had been part of a conspiracy against the union. UFW had also entered into a negotiation with the Teamsters union, a process led by Cohen. The two unions reached an agreement by which the UFW would cease bringing litigation against the Teamsters if the latter ceased operating among farm-workers altogether. This left the UFW as the only dominant union among the farmworkers. The Teamsters agreed because farmworkers were a marginal group for them; their typically low incomes also meant that farmworkers did not generate sufficient funds for the union to warrant its ongoing and costly clashes with the UFW.

=== Links with Synanon and Ferdinand Marcos: 1977 ===
I'm going to tell you something. It's not threatening, it's just plain fucking fact. If this union doesn't turn around and become a movement, I want no part of it. I'll help and everything, but I don't want to be in charge. I want to do something else. I tell you because that's the way I feel.

— Chavez arguing with the executive board to reform the UFW in 1977

Chavez told the executive committee that radical change was necessary in the UFW; he stated that they could be either a union or a movement, but not both. If the former, they would have to start paying wages to their staff rather than relying on volunteers, which at that time they were not in a financial position to do. He instead urged them to become a movement, which he argued meant establishing communal settlements for members, drawing on a Californian religious organization, Synanon, as an exemplar. Chavez had become increasingly interested in Synanon, a drug-treatment organization that had declared itself a religion in 1975 and which operated out of a compound east of Fresno. He admired Synanon's leader Charles Dederich, and the way that the latter controlled his planned community. In Chavez's opinion, Dederich was "a genius in terms of people".

In February 1977, Chavez took the UFW's executive board on a visit to the Synanon compound. There, they took part in a therapy system based on Dederich's own process, "the Game", as part of which each "player" was singled out in turn to receive harsh, profanity-laced criticism from the rest of the community. Dederich had told Chavez that "the Game" was key to reshaping the UFW, and the latter decided that he wanted everyone at La Paz to play it. He received tacit agreement from the executive board, although some of its members privately opposed the measure. The Game took place at La Paz on Sunday mornings and Wednesday evenings, and at its height, about 100 people were taking part in it each week. There it was used to shape behavior and punish nonconformity. Many individuals dreaded the humiliation it involved, disliked the obscenities that were part of it, and found going through it to be a traumatic experience. Chavez remained enthusiastic about the Game, calling it "a good tool to fine-tune the union". Many of those close to Chavez, including his wife and Richard Chavez, refused to take part. The farmworkers were not informed about the Game. Various long-term supporters of the UFW, including various clerical figures, visited La Paz at this time and left alarmed by how it had changed.

Synanon provided the UFW with $100,000 worth of cars and materials; building links with Chavez's movement burnished Dederich's reputation with rich liberals who were among Synanon's core constituency. Dederich suggested that Synanon and the UFW establish a joint communal farm, and although the option was explored, it did not materialize. Following Dederich's advice, Chavez began grooming young people who had grown up in the movement to remain committed to him and his ideals. He created a curriculum for them to follow, which included the Game. Whereas Chavez had previously refused to accept government money, he now applied for over $500,000 in grants for a school and other projects. Formal celebrations and group rituals became an important part of life at La Paz, while Chavez also declared that on Saturday mornings all residents of La Paz should work in the vegetable and flower gardens to improve sociability. A rule was passed that everyone at La Paz had to wear a UFW button at all times on penalty of a fine. After attending a course in Los Angeles, Chavez began claiming that he could heal people by laying on his hands.

In the field elections, the UFW was largely rebuffed by Filipino-American workers. Seeking to remedy this, in 1977 Chavez traveled to the Philippines as the guest of its president, Ferdinand Marcos. There, he was treated as a high-ranking dignitary, and received both an award from Marcos and an honorary doctorate from the Far Eastern University in Manila. He then spoke to a reporter from The Washington Post where he spoke positively about Marcos' introduction of martial law. This generated outcry in the US, especially among religious groups, who argued that Chavez was overlooking the human rights abuses taking place under Marcos' administration. Chavez then organized an event on Delano for five senior Filipino government officials to speak to an assembled audience. The incident eroded support among religious organizations, a key constituency for Chavez and the UFW.

Time magazine published a story reporting on violence and child abuse at Synanon, which it termed a "kooky cult". Synanon launched a boycott of Time in response, with Chavez urging the UFW to support it, stating that they should assist their friends and help protect religious freedom. Los Angeles police then raided Synanon's compound and revealed evidence that Dederich had sanctioned the use of violence against the group's critics and ex-members; several senior members were also found guilty of murdering a lawyer representing ex-Synanon members. Shortly after, the Peoples Temple run by the civil rights activist Jim Jones, a group which had been closely linked with California's leftist movement, committed mass suicide at their Jonestown community. A Democratic assemblyman soon issued a press release comparing the cult surrounding Chavez to the Peoples Temple. The UFW stopped using the Game in response to these developments; Chavez's calls for it to resume were rejected by other senior members.

The UFW continued to rely on voluntary labor, only paying a small number of employees, such as lawyers. When the union's lawyers, who were paid, asked for a raise, it generated a major debate among the executive committee. Chavez framed the issue along the lines of whether the UFW should start paying wages to everyone or instead continue to rely on volunteers. The executive committee split largely on generational lines, with older members backing Chavez's desire to remain a voluntary organization, and this attitude narrowly prevailed. Medina, one of only two former farmworkers on the board, resigned over the issue. Drake also resigned. Half of the lawyers left straight away, and the others in the coming weeks as the UFW switched to a voluntary legal department; the new volunteers were largely inexperienced. It was also in 1977 that the UFW declared that contributions to the union's political fund would become mandatory for members; this was then used to support political groups and candidates considered sympathetic to the UFW's interests.

== Later life ==
=== Growing schisms: 1978–1982 ===
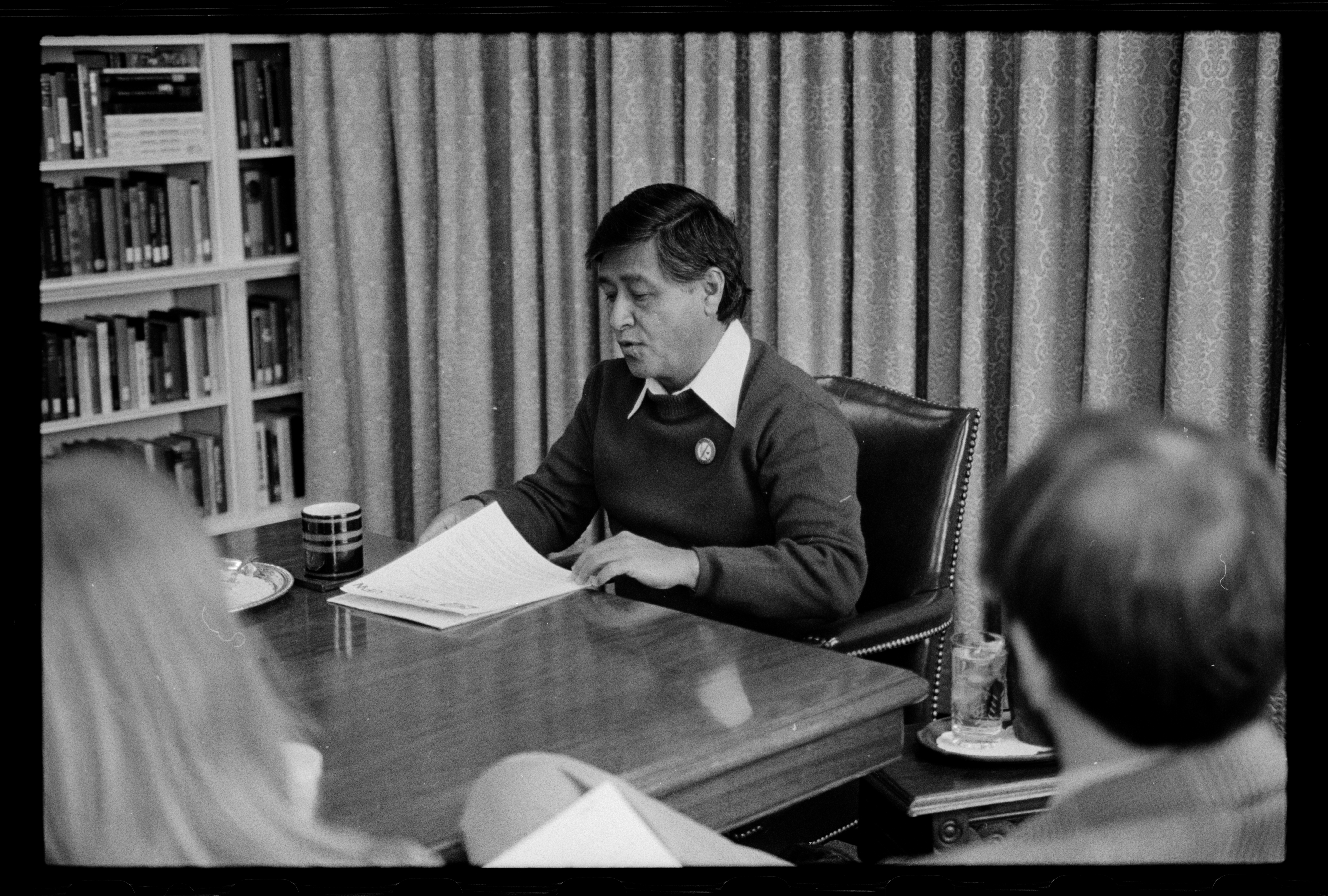
Chavez in 1979

In June 1978, Chavez joined a picket in Yuma as part of his cousin Manuel's Arizona melon strike. This broke an injunction and Chavez was thrown into the county jail for a night. By 1978, there was growing anger at the UFW among vegetable workers; they were frustrated by its incompetency, especially in the running of its medical plan. In the 22 farmworker elections that took place between June and September 1978, the UFW lost two-thirds.

To stop the loss of its contracts and members, Chavez launched his Plan de Flote, an initiative to regain the trust of the vegetable pickers. Chavez organized a new strike over wages, hoping that salary increases would stem the UFW's losses. The union made its wage demands in January 1979, days after its contracts had expired. Eleven lettuce growers in the Salinas and Imperial Valleys were included in the strike, which caused lettuce prices to soar.

During the strike, the picketers trespassed on the Mario Saikhon company fields and attempted to drive away those still working. The foreman and other employees opened fire and one picketer, Rufino Contreras, was killed. Chavez urged the strikers not to resort to violence and with Contreras' father led a three-mile candlelit funerary procession, attended by 7000 people. In June, Ganz and other strike organizers planned a show of strength whereby strikers rushed onto the Salinas field to cause disruption. This generated violent clashes; several people sustained stab wounds and 75 were arrested.

Vegetable growers accused Chavez of terrorism over the incident; Chavez criticized Ganz for organizing this without his approval. He then led a 12-day march from San Francisco to San Jose, beginning a fast on the sixth day. Arriving in Salinas, he met with strike leaders at a UFW convention. He argued that the strike was proving too costly for the UFW—it cost the union between $300,000 and $400,000 a month—and that they should end the strike and switch to a boycott campaign. The strike leaders rejected these suggestions. To end the strike, in August and September, several growers signed contracts with the UFW, but many held out and the union was broke. Chavez continued arguing for a boycott, suggesting that the union could use alcoholics from the cities to run the boycott campaign, an idea most of the executive board rejected.

Under the new contracts, the growers agreed to pay for paid workers' representatives whose job it would be to ensure a smooth relationship between the growers and the UFW. In May 1980, Chavez brought these paid representatives to La Paz for a five-day training session. Ganz, who was becoming increasingly distant from Chavez, helped tutor them. In May 1981, Chavez called all staff to a meeting at La Paz, where he again insisted that the UFW was being infiltrated by spies seeking to undermine it and overthrow him. He arranged for more of his loyalists to be put on the executive board, which now had no farmworkers sitting on it.

In September 1981 at the UFW's Fresno convention, the paid representatives nominated some of their own choices, rather than Chavez's, to go on the board. Chavez's supporters responded with leaflets claiming that the paid representatives were puppets of "the two Jews", Ganz and Cohen, who were trying to undermine the union. This brought allegations of antisemitism against Chavez. Seeking to undermine the paid representatives, Chavez proposed a measure that if 8% of workers at a ranch signed a petition, the representatives of that ranch would be obliged to vote for Chavez's chosen candidates. The measure passed.

Now we come to this 1981 convention facing yet another assault on our beloved union. An assault even more menacing than the past conventions. More menacing because it is clandestinely organized by those forces whose every wish and desire is our destruction. Obstruction by those evil forces visible and invisible who work at every chance to destroy us—the growers, the teamsters, disaffected former staff, scoundrels, and God knows who, some unwittingly trying to each the same goal—that is to bury our beloved union.

— Chavez at the 1981 convention

By October, all of those who had opposed Chavez's choices at the convention had been fired. They responded by launching a fast in protest outside the UFW's Salinas office. Nine of them then sued Chavez in a federal court, claiming that he had no right to fire them from positions that they had been elected to represent by their peers in the fields. Chavez responded with a counter-suit, suing them for libel and slander. He acknowledged to a reporter that in doing so, he was trying to intimidate the protester's lawyer, something which brought negative publicity for the UFW.

One of the protesters, Chava Bustamante, got work with the California Rural Legal Assistance group, at which the UFW began picketing their offices, trying to get Bustamante fired. In court, Chavez denied that the paid representatives were ever elected, alleging that they were appointed by him personally, but produced no evidence to support this claim. The US District Court Judge William Ingram rejected Chavez's argument, ruling that the sacking of the paid representatives had been unlawful. The UFW appealed the ruling, which dragged out for years, until the paid representatives ran out of funds to continue.

Opposition to Chavez's hostility to illegal migrants led senior UFW members in Texas and Arizona to break from the union and form their own groups, such as the Texas Farm Workers Union and the Maricopa County Organizing Project. Chavez and his cousin Manuel went to Texas to try and rally opposition to the schism. Manuel also went to Arizona, where he introduced a range of measures to undermine the new group. This led to the investigative journalist Tom Barry looking into Manuel's activities. It was revealed that under a pseudonym he had become a melon grower in Mexico, and that he was initiating strikes among US melon pickers as a means of improving the market for his own produce.

The UFW's reputation was further damaged after the magazine Reason exposed that the union had improperly spent nearly $1 million in federal funds. Federal and national investigations followed, confirming these allegations. The government asked the UFW to return over $250,000 in funds while the Internal Revenue Service ruled that the union owed $390,000 in back social security and federal unemployment taxes.

In 1982, the UFW held a celebration of the twentieth anniversary of its first convention at San Jose. In October 1982, Chavez's father died, with the funeral held in San Jose. Chavez was also involving himself in a broader range of leftist events. He co-chaired Tom Hayden and Jane Fonda's fund-raising dinner for their Campaign for Economic Democracy. In the summer of 1982 he appeared at Peace Sunday, an anti-nuclear event. The UFW had established itself as one of the largest political donors in California. Its political donations were often concealed from the public, funneled through intermediary committees. It donated thousands of dollars to Howard Berman's campaign to unseat Leo McCarthy as the Speaker of the California State Assembly because of McCarthy's role in defeating Proposition 14. Many Democrats feared that Berman would be beholden to Chavez and so backed Willie Brown, who won. The UFW subsequently also donated to Willie Brown.

=== The Chicano Lobby and commercial activities: 1983–1989 ===
The UFW's membership, and the subsequent membership dues they paid, continued to decline. In January 1983, UFW contracts covered 30,000 jobs but by January 1986 this had fallen to 15,000. In 1982, the dues that membership brought in were $2.9 million although this had fallen to $1 million three years later. By the early 1980s, there was a burgeoning Latino middle-class in the US. Although Chavez hated the aspirational approach that had encouraged working-class Latinos to become middle-class, he recognized that this offered the UFW a wider support base.

At the 1983 UFW convention, he announced the formation of a new non-profit organization, the Chicano Lobby. At the Lobby's launch, addresses were given by the San Antonio Mayor Henry Cisneros and the newly elected president of the Mexican American Political Association, Chavez's eldest son Fernando. To cope with its declining membership, the UFW sought to build its political influence. In November 1984, Chavez gave a speech to the Commonwealth Club of California. The UFW launched a print shop, with politicians who were eager to court the Latino vote increasingly used.

Chavez launched a boycott of grapes and Red Coach Lettuce because their parent company, Bruce Church, had refused to sign a contract with the UFW. Chavez launched a boycott of Lucky, a California supermarket chain. His strategy was to convince the supermarket that the UFW could damage its patronage among Latinos. Chavez had observed that the Christian Right was beginning to use new computer technologies to reach potential supporters and decided that the UFW should do the same. Through this, they were better able to target specific groups whom they regarded as sympathetic to their cause: Hispanics, middle-class African Americans, and liberal professionals living in the major cities. As part of its boycott, the UFW also bought television commercials, which it used to help raise money.

From the mid-1980s, Chavez increasingly focused the UFW's campaigns on opposing the use of pesticides in the fields, which he argued posed a danger both to farmworkers and to consumers. The UFW raised over $100,000, as well as donated equipment, to launch its own pesticide research lab, but this never opened. In his anti-pesticide campaigns he gained support from Ralph Nader. Chavez linked this approach in with the ongoing boycott of Bruce Church, arguing that if consumers boycotted the company's products, the growers would stop using pesticides. The UFW claimed that the high rates of childhood cancer in McFarland represented evidence of how pesticides impacted humans; they used footage of some of these children in a 17-minute video, The Wrath of Grapes. Many of the parents were angered and several sued the UFW, claiming that the union was exploiting their children for its own agenda. UFW activists also turned up at the funeral procession of a 14-year old who had died from cancer, where they carried union flags; the child's furious mother demanded that they leave.

In 1982, Jerry Brown ceased to be governor of California. He was replaced by the Republican George Deukmejian, who had the backing of the state's growers; under Deukmejian, the ALRB's influence eroded. In 1987, the UFW was found liable for $1.7 million in damages to the Maggio company for the illegal actions that the union carried out against it during their 1979 strike. As the UFW's boycott of Bruce Church products failed to gain traction, in July 1988 Chavez launched another public fast at Forty Acres. Three of Robert Kennedy's children visited, generating media attention for the fast.

After 19 days, Chavez broke the fast at a ceremony attended by the Democratic politician Jesse Jackson. The fast was followed by further purges at La Paz as Chavez accused more people of being saboteurs. Hartmire was among those pushed out, resigning in January 1989. Some of those at La Paz left before Chavez could target them, and the commune became increasingly depopulated. Chavez meanwhile continued to receive awards and honors. In November 1989, the Mexican government awarded him the Order of the Aztec Eagle, during which he had a private audience with Mexican President Carlos Salinas. In October 1990, Coachella became the first district to name a school after Chavez; he attended the dedication ceremony.

With membership dues declining, the UFW increasingly turned to commercial activities as a means of raising funds. It began marketing UFW branded merchandise through El Taller Grafico Speciality Advertising (ETG), which had Chavez as its chair. Chavez also set himself up as a housing developer, working in partnership with the Fresno businessman Celestino Aguilar. Together they bought properties undergoing foreclosure, renovated them, before selling them on. They ultimately moved from foreclosures to high-end custom built houses and subsidized apartment blocks. To conceal the UFW's involvement in these projects, Chavez and Aguilar formed the company American Liberty Investments.

They also established the Ideal Minimart Corporation, which built two strip malls and operated a check-cashing store. Richard's company, Bonita Construction, was hired for some of the work. The Fresno Bee subsequently reported that most of the UFW's housing projects had been built by non-union contractors. The trade unions representing the building unions expressed outrage at the news, highlighting that they had previously given financial support to the UFW. The New Yorker later termed the incident an "embarrassment".

=== Final years: 1990–1993 ===
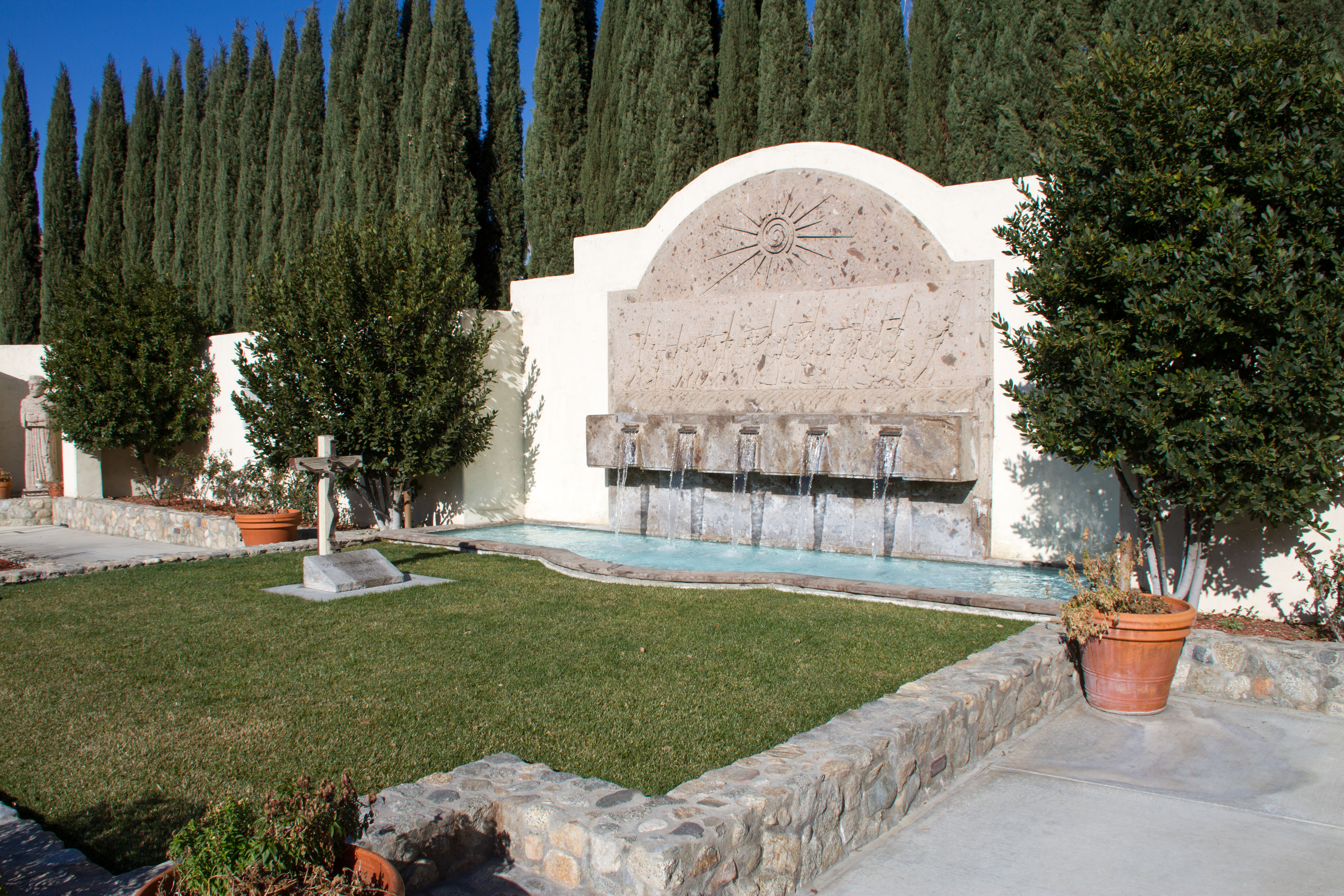
The grave of César Chávez is in the garden of the Cesar E. Chavez National Monument in Keene, California.

In the early 1990s, the UFW continued to market Chavez as a heroic figure, especially on university and college campuses. In 1990, he appeared at 64 events, earning an average of $3,800 for each appearance. In 1991, he launched a "Public Action Speaking Tour" of US colleges and universities. His standard speech at these events covered the problems facing farmworkers, the dangers of pesticides, the alliance of agribusiness and the Republican Party, and his view that boycotts and marches were a better means of achieving change than electoral politics.

Chavez's mother died in December 1991, aged 99. The following year, in September 1992, Chavez's mentor Ross died. Chavez gave the eulogy at his funeral. Chavez's final years saw the UFW's involvement in a legal battle with Bruce Church. The company had sued the union, claiming it libeled them and had illegally threatened supermarkets to stop them selling Red Coach lettuce. In 1988, a jury returned a $5.4 million verdict against the UFW, but this verdict was thrown out in the appeals court. The case was then remanded for trial on narrower grounds. Chavez was called to testify in front of a Yuma court in 1993. The stakes were high; a verdict against the UFW would have been financially devastating.

During the case, Chavez stayed at the home of a San Luis supporter. It was there that he died in bed on April 23. He was aged 66. Chavez's body was flown to Bakersfield aboard a chartered plane. The autopsy proved inconclusive, with the family stating that he had died of natural causes. Chavez had already stipulated that he wanted his brother Richard to build his coffin, and that his funeral should take place at Forty Acres. There, his body lay in state, where tens of thousands of people visited it. A funeral procession took place in Delano, with 120 pallbearers taking turns to carry the coffin. Chavez was then buried in a private ceremony at La Paz.

== Personal life ==
The union's survival, its very existence, sent out a signal to all Hispanics that we were fighting for our dignity. That we were challenging and overcoming injustice, that we were empowering the least educated among us, the poorest among us. The message was clear. If it could happen in the fields, it could happen anywhere: in the cities, in the courts, in the city councils, in the state legislatures. I didn't really appreciate it at the time, but the coming of our union signalled the start of great changes among Hispanics that are now only beginning to be seen.

— Cesar Chavez, 1984

When Chavez returned home from his service in the military in 1948, he married his high school sweetheart, Helen Fabela. The couple moved to San Jose, California. With his wife, he had eight children: Fernando (b. 1949), Sylvia (b. 1950), Linda (b. 1951), Eloise (b. 1952), Anna (b. 1953), Paul (b. 1957), Elizabeth (b. 1958), and Anthony (b. 1958).

Helen avoided the limelight, a trait which Chavez admired. While he led the union, she focused on raising the children, cooking, and housekeeping.

Senior UFW figures later said that Chavez engaged in adultery during the latter part of the 1970s, and that they kept this knowledge quiet so as not to damage his reputation as a devoted Catholic family man. After Helen read a love letter written to Chavez by another woman, she temporarily left La Paz and lived with one of her daughters in Delano. Chavez denied the affairs and later convinced his wife to return to their home.

Chavez's children resented the union and displayed little interest in it, although most ended up working for it. Of these children, Chavez's eldest son, Fernando, was the only one to graduate from college; Chavez's relationship with Fernando was strained, as he was frustrated with what he saw as his son's interest in becoming middle-class.

Chavez expressed traditional views on gender roles and was little influenced by the second wave feminism that was contemporary with his activism. In his movement, men took almost all the senior roles, with women largely being confined to background roles as secretaries, nurses, or in child-care; the main exception was Huerta. According to Huerta, Chavez did not promote women to leading policy-making roles.

Chavez had a close working relationship with Huerta. They became mutually dependent, and although she did not hesitate to raise complaints with him, she also usually deferred to him. During their working relationship, they often argued, something which intensified in the latter part of the 1970s. Huerta stated that she was Chavez's "whipping girl" when he was under pressure. Huerta would later state that Chavez sexually assaulted her on two separate occasions (at least one of which was rape), with both assaults resulting in pregnancies. Huerta carried each child to term and they were adopted by other families. Genetic testing confirmed that Huerta and Chavez were the biological parents.

He never had close friendships outside of his family, believing that friendships distracted from his political activism.

Physically, Chavez was 5'6" and had jet black hair. He was quiet, and Bruns described him as being "outwardly shy and unimposing".

Like many farm laborers, he experienced severe back pain throughout his life. He could be self-conscious about his lack of formal education and was uncomfortable interacting with affluent people. When speaking with reporters, he sometimes mythologized his own life story.

Chavez was not a great orator; according to Pawel, "his power lay not in words, but in actions". She noted that he was "not an articulate speaker", and similarly, Bruns observed that he "had no special talent as a public speaker". He was soft-spoken, and according to Pawel had an "informal, conversational style", and was "good at reading people".

He was unwilling to delegate or trust others. He preferred to tackle every task personally. He was also capable of responding quickly and decisively to events.

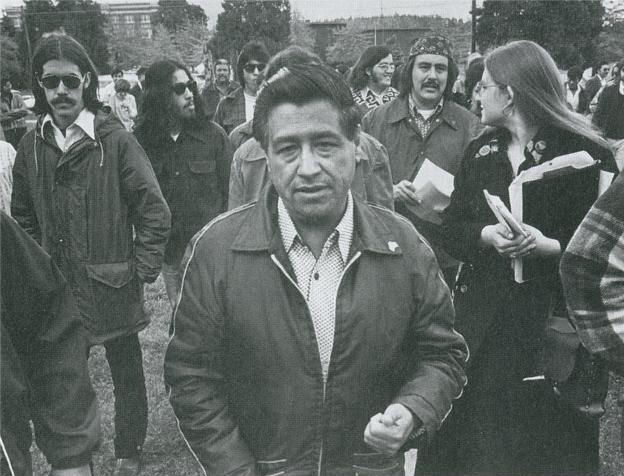
Chavez visiting Colegio Cesar Chavez in 1974

Bruns described Chavez as combining a "remarkable tenacity with a sense of serenity". A tireless worker, he was known for often working 18 hours a day; he used to start his working day at 3:30am and would often continue working until 10pm. He stated that "I just sleep and eat and work. I do nothing else."

Pawel stated that as a leader, Chavez was both "charming, attentive, and humble" as well as being "single-minded, demanding, and ruthless". When he wanted to criticize one of his volunteers or staff members he usually did so in private, but on occasion could berate them in a public confrontation.

He described his own life's work as a crusade against injustice, and displayed a commitment to self-sacrifice. Pawel thought that "Chavez thrived on the power to help people and the way that made him feel".

Ross, who was a friend and colleague of Chavez's for many years, noted that "He would do in thirty minutes what it would take me or somebody else thirty days". Pawel noted that Chavez was "openly ruthless" in his "drive to be the one and only farm labor leader". He was stubborn and would rarely back down once he had taken a stance. He would not accept criticism of himself, but would deflect it.

Chavez was a Catholic whose faith strongly influenced both his social activism and his personal outlook. He rarely missed Mass and liked to open all of his meetings with either a Mass or a prayer. Privately, he also liked to meditate.

In 1970, he became a vegetarian, stating that "I wouldn't eat my dog, you know. Cows and dogs are about the same." As part of this diet he also shunned most dairy products except cottage cheese. He credited this diet with easing his chronic back pain. He also avoided eating processed foods. Among his favorite foods were traditional Mexican and Chinese cuisines.

Chavez had a love of the music of Duke Ellington and big band music; he enjoyed dancing. He was also an amateur photographer, and a keen gardener, making his own compost and growing vegetables.

For much of his adult life he kept German Shepherd dogs for personal protection. Two of those he kept at La Paz were named Boycott and Huelga.

Chavez preserved many of his notes, letters, the minutes of meetings, as well as tape recordings of many interviewers, and at the encouragement of Philip P. Mason donated these to the Walter P. Reuther Library, where they are kept. He disliked telephone conversations, suspecting that his phone line was bugged. He tended to see problems faced by his movement not as evidence of innocent mistakes but as deliberate sabotage.

Chavez was self-educated, with Pawel noting that he was "disinclined to analyze information". Once Chavez accepted an idea, he could dedicate himself to it wholeheartedly.

== Political views ==
The men and women who have suffered and endured much and not only because of our abject poverty but because we have been kept poor. The color of our skins, the languages of our cultural and native origins, the lack of formal education, the exclusion from the democratic process, the numbers of our slain in recent wars — all these burdens generation after generation have sought to demoralize us, to break our human spirit. But God knows we are not beasts of burden, we are not agricultural implements or rented slaves, we are men. And mark this well [..] we are men locked in a death struggle against man's inhumanity to man in the industry you represent. And this struggle itself gives meaning to our life and ennobles our dying.

— Cesar Chavez's open letter to the grape industry amid the Grape Strike

Chavez described his movement as promoting "a Christian radical philosophy". According to Chavez biographer Roger Bruns, he "focused the movement on the ethnic identity of Mexican Americans" and on a "quest for justice rooted in Catholic social teaching". Chavez saw his fight for farmworkers' rights as a symbol for the broader cultural and ethnic struggle for Mexican Americans in the United States.

Chavez utilized a range of tactics drawing on Catholic religion, including vigils, public prayers, a shrine on the back of his station wagon, and references to dead farmworkers as "martyrs". His point in doing so was not necessarily to proselytize, but to use the socio-political potential of Christianity for his own campaigns. Most of the farmworkers his union represented shared his Catholicism and were happy to incorporate its religious practices into their marches, strikes, and other UFW activities.

Chavez called on his fellow Catholics to be more consistent in standing up for the religion's values. He stated that "in a nutshell, what do we want the Church to do? We don't ask for more cathedrals. We don't ask for bigger churches or fine gifts. We ask for its presence with us, beside us, as Christ among us. We ask the Church to sacrifice with the people for social change, for justice, and for love of brother." Ospino stated that "The combination of labor organizing strategies with explicit expressions of Catholic religiosity made Chavez's approach unique" within the US labor movement, although some of his associates, non-Catholics, and other parts of the labor movement were critical of his use of Catholic elements.

Chavez abhorred poverty, regarding it as dehumanizing, and wanted to ensure a better standard of living for the poor. He was frustrated that most farmworkers appeared more interested in money and did not appreciate the values that he espoused. He was concerned that, as he had seen with the CSO, individuals moving out of poverty often adopted middle-class values; he viewed the middle classes with contempt. He recognized that union activity was not a long-term solution to poverty across society and suggested that forming co-operatives therefore might be the best solution.

In Chavez's view, workers' cooperatives offered a middle ground economic choice between the failed system of capitalism and the state socialism of Marxist-Leninist countries. His son Paul recalls "My father's basic premise was that capitalism was not going to work because it was too harsh and always took advantage of those least able to defend themselves". He also embraced ideals about communal living, and saw the La Paz commune he established in California as a model for others to follow.

Chavez kept a large portrait of Mahatma Gandhi in his office, alongside another of Martin Luther King and busts of both John F. Kennedy and Abraham Lincoln. Influenced by the ideas of Gandhi and King, Chavez emphasized non-violent confrontation as a tactic. He repeatedly referred to himself as the leader of the "non-violent Viet Cong", a reference to the Vietnamese Marxist-Leninist militia that the US was combating in the Vietnam War. He was interested in Gandhi's ideas on non-violence and in the Indian's voluntary embrace of poverty, his use of fasting, and his ideas about community.

Fasting was important for Chavez. He saw it not as a tactic to pressure his opponents, but rather to motivate his supporters, keeping them focused on the cause and on avoiding violence. He also saw it as a sign of solidarity with the suffering of the people. Chavez was also interested in Gandhi's ideas about sacrifice, noting that "I like the idea of sacrifice to do things. If they are done that way they are more lasting. If they cost more, then you will value them more."

Apart from Catholic social teaching, the movement of Chavez was also based on liberation theology, emphasizing liberation of the poor and self-sacrifice in the pursuit of justice. Liberation theology sought to centralize Catholic faith on the perspective and plight of the excluded, marginalized, poor and oppressed; basic points of liberation theology was the belief that God speaks directly for and to the poor, and that socioeconomic systems that oppress the poor are morally unacceptable. Gustavo Gutierrez, who provided much of the theoretical basis for liberation theology, stated that the "theology of liberation represents the right of the poor to think".

Frederick John Dalton argues that Chavez was the reflection of liberation theology, writing: "The moral vision of Cesar Chavez is the moral vision of a Mexican-American migrant farm worker and labor organizer with no formal education beyond the eighth grade. It is the moral vision of a man who knew the indignities of being impoverished and excluded. A field laborer of Mexican descent, he experienced life as a nonperson, as little more than an agricultural implement, a cost to be minimized." Similarly, Mark R. Day, a member of UFW, remarked that "in many ways we were practicing liberation theology in Delano in the late 1960s."

Many of the UFW's protests have been interpreted as representing not only farmworkers but the Mexican-American community more broadly, making a statement that Anglo-Americans must recognize Mexican-Americans as "legitimate players in American life". Chavez saw parallels in the way that African Americans were treated in the United States to the way that he and his fellow Mexican Americans were treated. He absorbed many of the tactics that African American civil rights activists had employed throughout the 1960s, applying them to his own movement. He was willing to take risks. Chavez recognized the impact that his farm-worker campaigns had had on the Chicano Movement during the early 1970s, although he kept his distance from the latter movement and many of its leaders. He condemned the violence that some figures in the Chicano Movement espoused.

=== On organization and leadership ===
Chavez placed the success of the movement above all else; Pawel described him as "the ultimate pragmatist". He felt that he had to be both the leader and the organizer-in-chief of his movement because only he had the necessary commitment to the cause. He was interested in power and how to use it; although his role model in this was Gandhi, he also studied the ideas about power by Niccolò Machiavelli, Adolf Hitler, and Mao Zedong, drawing ideas from each. His use of purges to expel people from his movement was influenced by Mao's Cultural Revolution, and he opened a June 1978 board meeting by reciting a poem by Mao.

Chavez repeatedly referred to himself as a community organizer rather than as a labor leader and underscored that distinction. He wanted his organization to represent not just a union but a larger social movement. He was ambivalent about the national labor movement. He personally disliked many of the prominent figures within the American labor movement but, as a pragmatist, recognized the value of working with organized labor groups. He opposed the idea of paying wages to those who worked for the union, believing that it would destroy the spirit of the movement. He rarely fired people from their positions, but instead made their working situation uncomfortable so that they would resign.

Chavez's leadership style was authoritarian; he stated that when he launched his movement, he initially had "total, absolute power" over it. Bruns characterized the UFW under Chavez as an "autocratic regime". Ex-members of the group, such as Bustamante and Padilla described Chavez as a dictator within the union. Chavez felt unable to share the responsibilities of running his movement with others. In 1968, Fred Hirsch noted that "one thing which characterizes Cesar's leadership is that he takes full responsibility for as much of the operation as he is physically capable of. All decisions are made by him."

Itliong noted that "Cesar is afraid that if he shares the authority with the people [...] they might run away from him." Pawel noted that Chavez wanted "yes-men" around him. He divided members of movements such as his into three groups: those that achieved what they set out to do, those that worked hard but failed what they set out to do, and those that were lazy. He thought that the latter needed to be expelled from the movement. He highly valued individuals who were loyal, efficient, and took the initiative.

Explaining his attitudes toward activism, he told his volunteers that "nice guys throughout the ages have done very little for humanity. It isn't the nice guy who gets things done. It's the hardheaded guy." He admitted that he could be "a real bastard" when dealing with movement members; Chavez told UFW volunteers that "I'm a son of a bitch to work with." He would play different people against each other to get what he wanted, particularly to break apart allies who might form an independent power bloc that would threaten his domination of the movement.

== Reception and legacy ==
An illustration of labor leader César Chávez, by Manuel Gregorio Acosta, was on the cover of Time, published July 4, 1969.

[Chavez's] dream was to found a labor union of farmworkers. He had no money, no political connections, and no experience. He was not a particularly dynamic personality and had no special talent as a public speaker. The dream, he knew, was almost fanciful. Nevertheless, through determination, grit, and a dogged will to win, he forged a movement that successfully challenged powerful entrenched economic and political interests and helped thousands of Mexican Americans to new cultural self-awareness.

— Roger Bruns, 2005

In the popular imagination, Chavez and the movement he led became largely synonymous, although throughout his career, Chavez prompted strong reactions from others. Since his death, there has been a struggle to define his legacy.

During his lifetime, many of Chavez's supporters idolized him, engaging in a form of hero worship. Bruns noted that many of his supporters "nearly worshipped him as a folk hero". In 1982, the American country music singer Kris Kristofferson called Chavez "the only true hero we have walking on this Earth today." These supporters were known as "Chavistas"; many of them, especially those living at the La Paz commune, emulated his vegetarian diet.

By the 1970s, he was increasingly referred to as a "saint" among those who supported him. In response to these claims, Chavez insisted that "There is a big difference between being a saint and being an angel[...] Saints are known for being tough and stubborn." In 1972, John Zerzan described Chavez as presenting himself as "a Christ-figure sacrificing all for his flock" through his fasts, adding that Chavez took the form of a "messianic leader". The scholar of Latino studies Lilia Soto called him and Huerta "freedom fighters".

He received a range of awards and accolades, which he claimed to hate. For these supporters, his visions for the future were regarded as inspirational. Bruns noted that he had "a mesmerizing effect on the lives of thousands. They saw in him nobility, sacrifice, and the grit of the underdog who refuses to give up." Throughout his career as an activist, he received strong ecumenical support. The UFW gained the support of mainline Protestant groups in a way that previous farmworker movements never had.

Chavez was despised by many growers. John Giumarra Jr, of the Giumarra company, called Chavez a "New Left guerrilla", someone who wanted to topple "the established structure of American democracy". The FBI monitored him and many other senior figures in his movement, concerned that they were subversive. Having monitored him for over a decade, the FBI's dossier on Chavez grew to over 1,500 pages in length. They ultimately found no evidence suggesting he had communist leanings. During the late 1960s and early 1970s, he received a series of death threats, and—according to Bruns—he often faced "spiteful mobs and scurrilous race-baiting".

Within Chavez's movement itself, there was concern and criticism of his methods. It the early 1970s, for instance, Chavez-supporter George Higgins wrote a private memo arguing that Chavez "appealed very crassly" to feelings of guilt among many "Protestant social actionists" and threatened them "with the enmity of the poor" if they failed to meet with Chavez's demands. Many ex-members of the UFW took the view that Chavez had been a poor administrator. Other labor unions had long been wary of Chavez's movement, with the UFW gaining a reputation for always wanting money but doing little to assist others.

In the US union movement, many skeptics believed that Chavez's idealism detracted from his effectiveness as a union leader. Paul Hall of the Seafarers International Union of North America met him in Washington, D.C., during the 1970s, at which he criticized Chavez for acting like a saint rather than a union leader, stating that he had become "a fad – the poor man others can support to expiate their sins." Some Mexican-Americans were critical of Chavez, believing him an agitator and trouble-maker who was insufficiently patriotic in his views of the United States. Some critics believed that Chavez's activism was mobilized largely by the desire for personal gain and ambition.

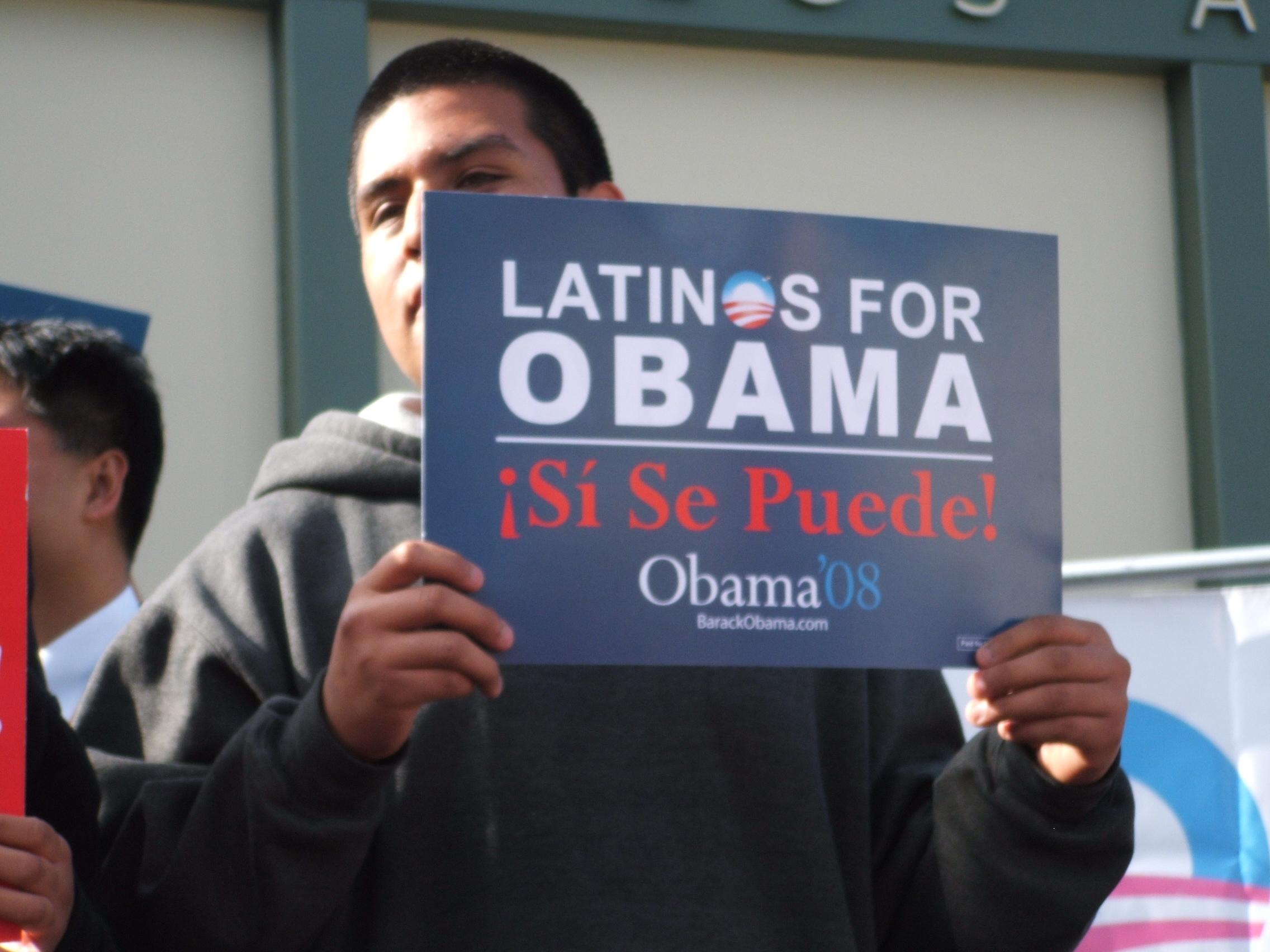
A campaigner for Barack Obama's 2008 presidential campaign holding up a "Sí se puede" plaque. The slogan was coined by Dolores Huerta in 1972 and used by the UFW as its official motto.

Bruns noted that Chavez's movement was "part of the fervor of change [in the United States] of the late 1960s", alongside the civil rights movement and the campaign against the Vietnam War. The historian Ronald A. Wells described Chavez as "one of the most important Christian activists in our time," while the theologian Hosffman Ospino called him "one of the most influential social leaders in the history of the United States". Pawel referred to Chavez as "an improbable idol in an era of telegenic leaders and charismatic speakers".

The historian Nelson Lichtenstein commented that Chavez's UFW oversaw "the largest and most effective boycott [in the United States] since the colonists threw tea into Boston Harbor". Lichtenstein also stated that Chavez had become "an iconic, foundational figure in the political, cultural, and moral history" of the Latino American community. Many Latinos drew inspiration from his movement, including student activists – for instance, UCSC's Cesar Chavez Convocation. He has been described as a "folk saint" of the Mexican-American community. A 1983 poll conducted by the Los Angeles Times found that Chavez was the Latino whom the Latinos of California most admired.

The scholar Steven Lloyd-Moffett argued that after Chavez's death, the "liberal intelligentsia and Chicano activists" came to dominate attempts to define his legacy and that they downplayed his firm commitment to Christianity so as to portray him as being motivated by "a secular ideology of justice and non-violence". When the Democratic Party candidate Barack Obama was campaigning for the presidency in 2008, he used Sí se puede—translated into English as "Yes we can"—as one of his main campaign slogans. When Obama was seeking re-election in 2012, he visited Chavez's grave and placed a rose upon it, also declaring his Union Headquarters to be a national monument.

Chavez's work has continued to exert influence on later activists. For instance, in his 2012 article in the Journal of the Society of Christian Ethics, Kevin J. O'Brien argued that Chavez could be "a vital resource for contemporary Christian ecological ethics". O'Brien argued that it was both Chavez's focus on "the moral centrality of human dignity" as well as his emphasis on sacrifice that could be of use by Christians wanting to engage in environmentalist activism. The theologian Carlos R. Piar similarly stated that Hispanic people should look to Chavez as an exemplar for "a way of being Christian in the United States."

=== Orders, decorations, monuments, and honors ===
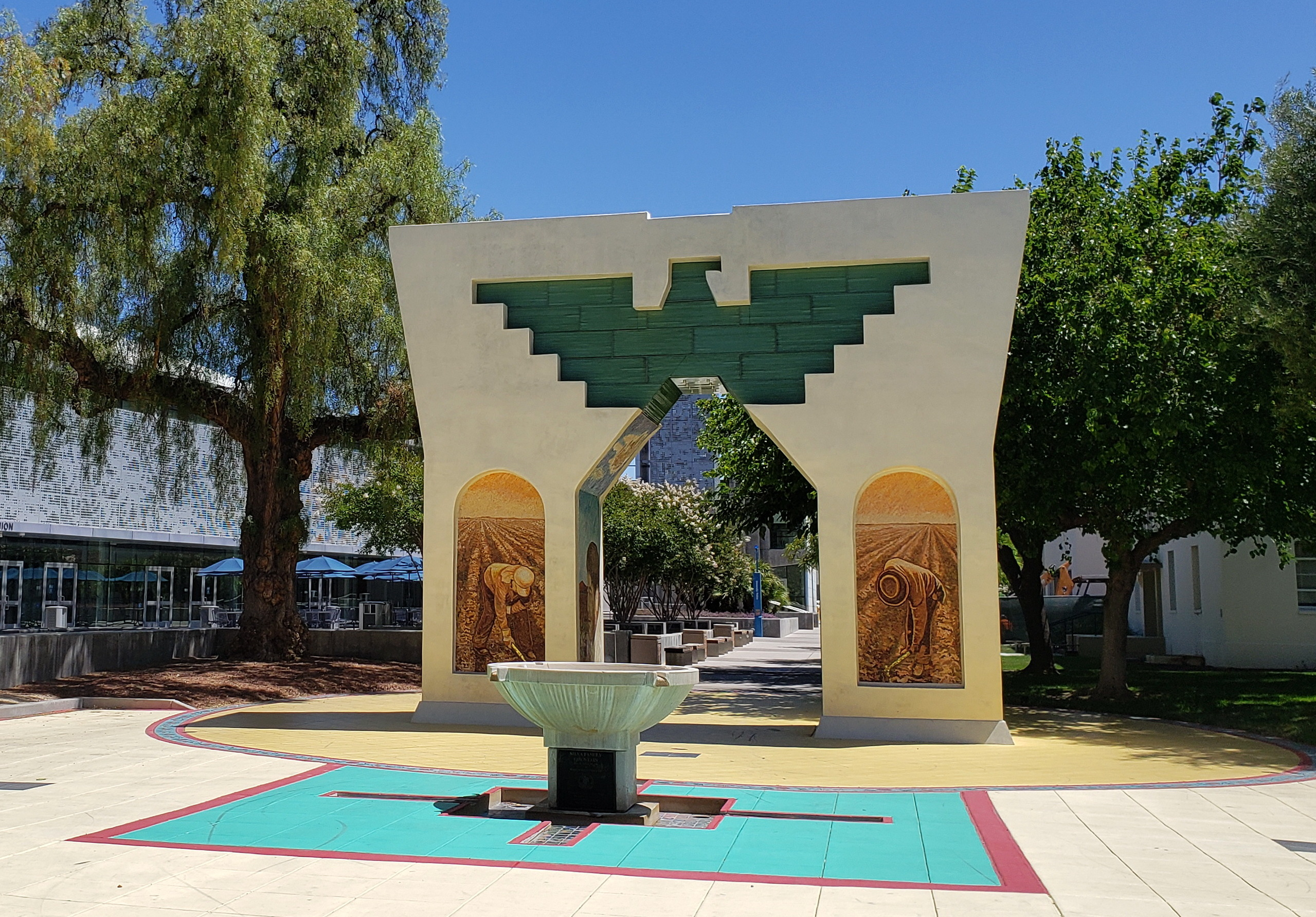
The Arch of Dignity, Equality, and Justice by Judy Baca, is dedicated to Chavez, and is on the Plaza de César Chávez at San José State University.

Chavez has received a range of awards, both during his lifetime and posthumously.

In 1973, Chavez received the Jefferson Award for Greatest Public Service Benefiting the Disadvantaged,

From 1973 to 1983, Colegio Cesar Chavez, named after Chavez while he was still alive, was a four-year "college without walls" that ran in Mount Angel, Oregon, intended for the education of Mexican-Americans.

In 1976, Stevie Wonder referred to Chavez in the song "Black Man" from his album Songs in the Key of Life (1976).

In 1992, Chavez received the Pacem in Terris Award, a Catholic award meant to honor "achievements in peace and justice".

In 1993, Eleanor Helin, at Palomar Observatory, discovered asteroid 6982 Cesarchavez, which was named in his memory. The naming citation would be published by the Minor Planet Center in August 2019 (M.P.C. 115893).

In August 1994, Chavez was posthumously awarded the Presidential Medal of Freedom, the country's highest honor for non-military personnel, by Democratic President Bill Clinton. Chavez's widow collected it from the White House. Clinton stated that Chavez had been a "remarkable man": "He was for his own people a Moses figure."

A portrait of Chavez has been placed in the National Portrait Gallery in Washington, D.C.

In 2000, artist Johanna Poethig created a three-dimensional mural called Tiene la lumbre por dentro (He Has the Fire Within Him) (2000) at Sonoma State University, honoring Chavez and the Farm Workers Movement.

In 2002, Americans for Democratic Action created the Reuther-Chavez Award "to recognize important activist, scholarly and journalistic contributions on behalf of workers' rights, especially the right to unionize and bargain collectively".

In 2003, the United States Postal Service honored Chavez with a postage stamp.

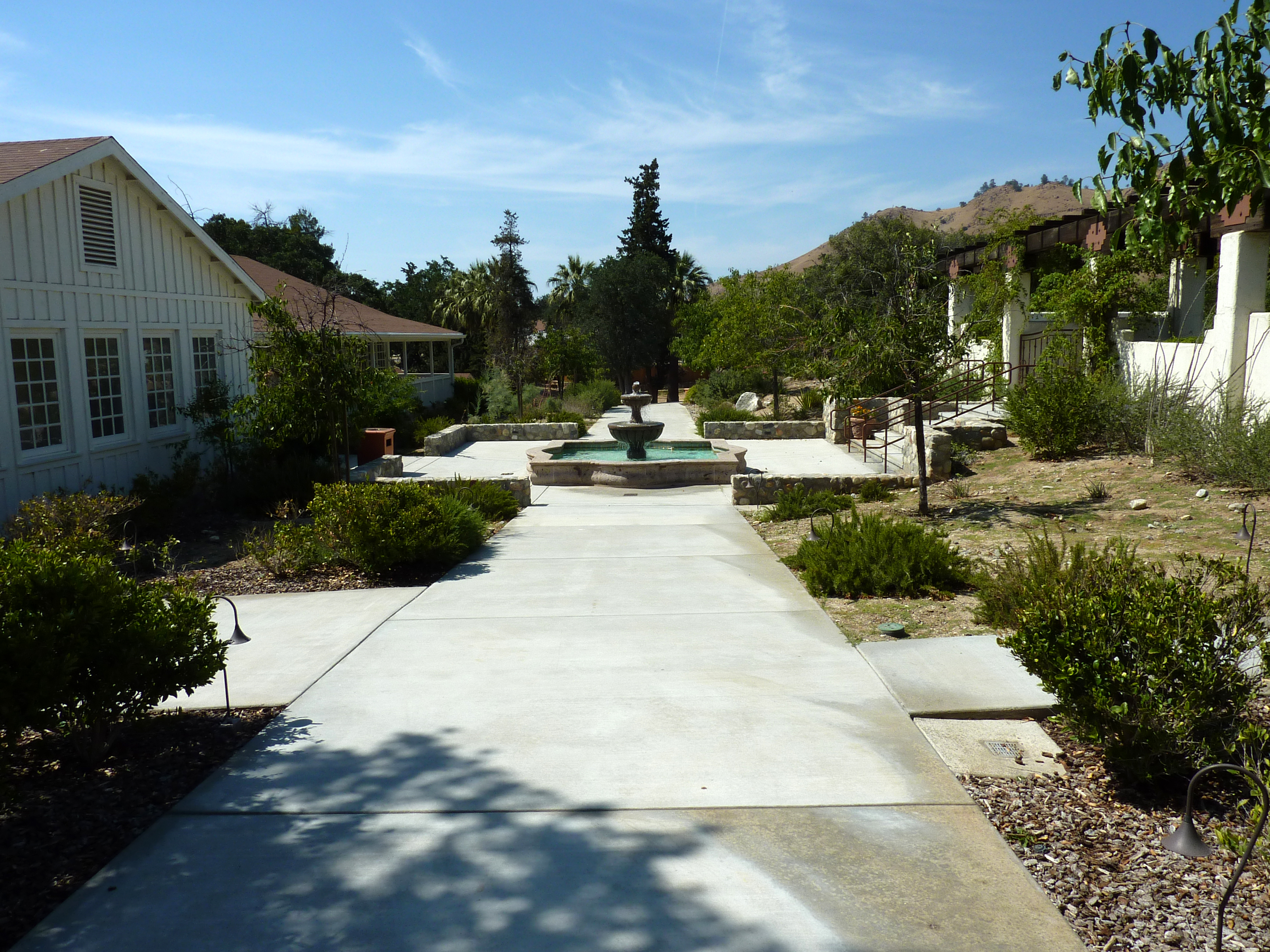
The National Chavez Center, Keene, California

In 2004, the National Chavez Center was opened on the UFW national headquarters campus in Keene by the César E. Chávez Foundation, consisting of a visitor center, a memorial garden, and his grave site. When completed, the 187-acre (76 ha) site was to include a museum and conference center to explore and share Chavez's work.

In 2006, California Governor Arnold Schwarzenegger inducted Chavez into the California Hall of Fame.

California State University San Marcos' Chavez Plaza includes a statue to Chavez.

In 2007, The University of Texas at Austin unveiled its own Cesar Chavez statue on campus.

In 2008, the Consolidated Natural Resources Act of 2008 authorized the National Park Service to conduct a special resource study of sites that are significant to the life of Cesar Chavez and the farm labor movement in the western United States. The study evaluated the significance and suitability of sites significant to Cesar Chavez and the farm labor movement, and the feasibility and appropriateness of a National Park Service role in the management of any of these sites.

In May 2011, Navy Secretary Ray Mabus announced that the Navy would be naming the last of 14 Lewis and Clark-class cargo ships after Cesar Chavez. The USNS Cesar Chavez was launched on May 5, 2012.

On September 14, 2011, the United States Department of the Interior added the 187-acre (76 ha) Nuestra Senora Reina de La Paz ranch to the National Register of Historic Places.

In October 2012, President Barack Obama designated the Cesar E. Chavez National Monument within the National Park system.

In March 2013, Google celebrated his 86th birthday with a Google Doodle.

In 2014, the American film César Chávez (2014), starring Michael Peña as Chavez, covered Chavez's life in the 1960s and early 1970s. That same year, a documentary film, titled Cesar's Last Fast (2014), was released.

On April 23, 2015, the 22nd anniversary of his death, Chavez received belated full military honors from the US Navy at his graveside.

In 2015, statues of Chavez and Huerta were erected above a pizzeria in Downtown Napa, financed by a wealthy private citizen, Michael Holcomb, rather than city authorities.

The American Friends Service Committee (AFSC) nominated Chavez three times for the Nobel Peace Prize.

In 2021, at the start of Joe Biden's presidency, a bust of Chavez was placed on a table directly behind the Resolute desk in the Oval Office.

=== Observances ===
Cesar Chavez's birthday, March 31, was a holiday in California; Denver, Colorado; and Texas.. In California, following the sexual assault and abuse allegations, the holiday was renamed "Farmworkers Day". It is intended to promote community service in honor of Chavez's life and work. Many, but not all, state government offices, community colleges, and libraries are closed. Many public schools in the three states are also closed.

Chavez Day is an optional holiday in Arizona.

Although it is not a federal holiday, President Barack Obama proclaimed March 31 "Cesar Chavez Day" in the United States, with Americans being urged to "observe this day with appropriate service, community, and educational programs to honor César Chávez's enduring legacy".

The heavily Hispanic city of Laredo, Texas, observes "Cesar Chavez Month" during March. Organized by the local League of United Latin American Citizens, a citizens' march is held in downtown Laredo on the last Saturday morning of March to commemorate Chavez.

In the Mission District, San Francisco a "Cesar Chavez Holiday Parade" is held on the second weekend of April, in honor of Cesar Chavez.

== Sexual abuse allegations ==
On March 17, 2026, allegations of sexual abuse against Chavez led United Farm Workers to cancel their tribute to Chavez just weeks before the annual event. UFW statements indicated that Chavez was accused of sexually abusing minors. Many celebrations were also canceled nationwide.

The following day, The New York Times published an investigation stating that Chavez had sexually abused two adolescent girls on a regular basis between 1972 and 1977. Dolores Huerta also released a statement via Medium stating that Chavez sexually assaulted her on two separate occasions, at least one of which was rape. Both assaults resulted in pregnancy, each of which Huerta carried to term. She then arranged for the children to be raised by others. The Times confirmed Chavez was biologically related to the children with DNA evidence. Following the Times investigation, Huerta disclosed that she had told the now-adult individuals the truth about their conception several weeks before the article came out. Huerta further accused Chavez of emotional abuse, including yelling insults at her during a union board meeting and calling her a "stupid bitch". In a statement, Huerta said that she had not spoken out for fear that criticizing Chavez would hurt the farmworkers' movement. Chavez biographer Miriam Pawel reported that many other union members had similarly avoided speaking out about Chavez's behavior for fear of damaging the UFW's reputation.

In the wake of the allegations, many tributes to Chavez were removed or canceled. The California Museum announced that it would remove Chavez from the state's Hall of Fame, the first removal in its history. Several states and cities canceled their yearly celebrations of Chavez. The state of California passed Assembly Bill 2156 which changed the name of the March 31st public holiday, previously Cesar Chavez Day, to Farmworkers Day, as a response to the allegations.

== See also ==
- List of civil rights leaders
- List of peace activists
- List of vegans
- Union organizer

== Notes ==
Trade union offices
Preceded by Union founded	President of the United Farm Workers; 1963–1993	Succeeded by Arturo Rodriguez
