= California Migrant Ministry =

American civil rights organization

- Founded: 1920s (state offshoot); formally active in California since 1957
- Founder: National Migrant Ministry (national initiative)
- Dissolved: Renamed National Farm Worker Ministry in 1971
- Type: Non‑profit · Ecumenical Christian organization
- Purpose: Provide direct services and support farmworkers’ organizing and social justice efforts
- Headquarters: California, U.S.
- Region served: Migrant and seasonal farm workers in California
- Services: Childcare camps, literacy & English classes, hygiene instruction, food/hygiene distribution, daycare, health outreach
- Key people: Doug Still (CMM director, from 1957); Chris Hartmire (director, 1961–1971)
- Affiliations: Community Service Organization, United Farm Workers (UFW), National Migrant Ministry

The California Migrant Ministry (CMM) was a non-profit ecumenical organization that supported migrant farm workers and later became involved in farmworker organizing in California.

== History ==
The National Migrant Ministry, established in 1920 as an interdenominational initiative, aimed to address the needs of migratory farm workers. Affiliated with the National Council of Churches, it provided health care, vocational training, recreational activities, and religious services at New Deal labor camps nationwide. By the 1950s, 38 states, including California, had established migrant ministry programs.

Doug Still became the director of the CMM in 1957, and established a rural ministry in the San Joaquin and Imperial Valleys, offering services like camps for children, English classes, personal hygiene instruction, daycare centers, and food distribution. With the help of a Schwarzhaupt Foundation grant, the CMM staff trained with the Community Service Organization (CSO), led by Fred Ross, where they met Cesar Chavez.

Based in part on influence from the Community Service Organization, CMM members began to question if charitable service alone was sufficient. They believed that empowering farm workers to fight for better wages and combat job discrimination was a more effective long-term solution. It was during this time period in the late 1950s that the CMM first began to be influenced by Saul Alinsky and his principles for organization.

Chris Hartmire, a Presbyterian minister and graduate of both Princeton University and Union Theological Seminary, took over as CMM director in 1961. Under Hartmire, the CMM increased its involvement in community organizing, and by 1965 CMM had fully embraced farm worker unionization as a major part of its mission. The CMM lobbied against the Bracero Program and supported farm worker organizing.

== Involvement in the Delano Grape Strike ==
During the Delano grape strike in 1965, the CMM supported Chavez and the United Farm Workers (UFW), providing resources and mobilizing church support. Three years later, Presbyterian Life (the flagship magazine of the mainline United Presbyterian Church) featured a sympathetic article on the movement. The magazine later published a rebuttal by agricultural businessman Allan Grant. The two articles presented opposing views within the Presbyterian Church on support for the strike.

== Religious influence and opposition ==
The CMM's support for the union drew both support and opposition from religious groups. However, the CMM continued to advocate support for the farm workers at church meetings and denominational gatherings.

== Legacy ==
In 1971, the CMM (and its parent organization the National Migrant Ministry) became the National Farm Worker Ministry. It formally redefined its mission to support farm workers through organizing and unionization.

The archives of the CMM are held at the Walter P. Reuther Library at Wayne State University.
