= Tulare labor camps rent strike =

1965–1968 rent strike

- Part of the Chicano Movement
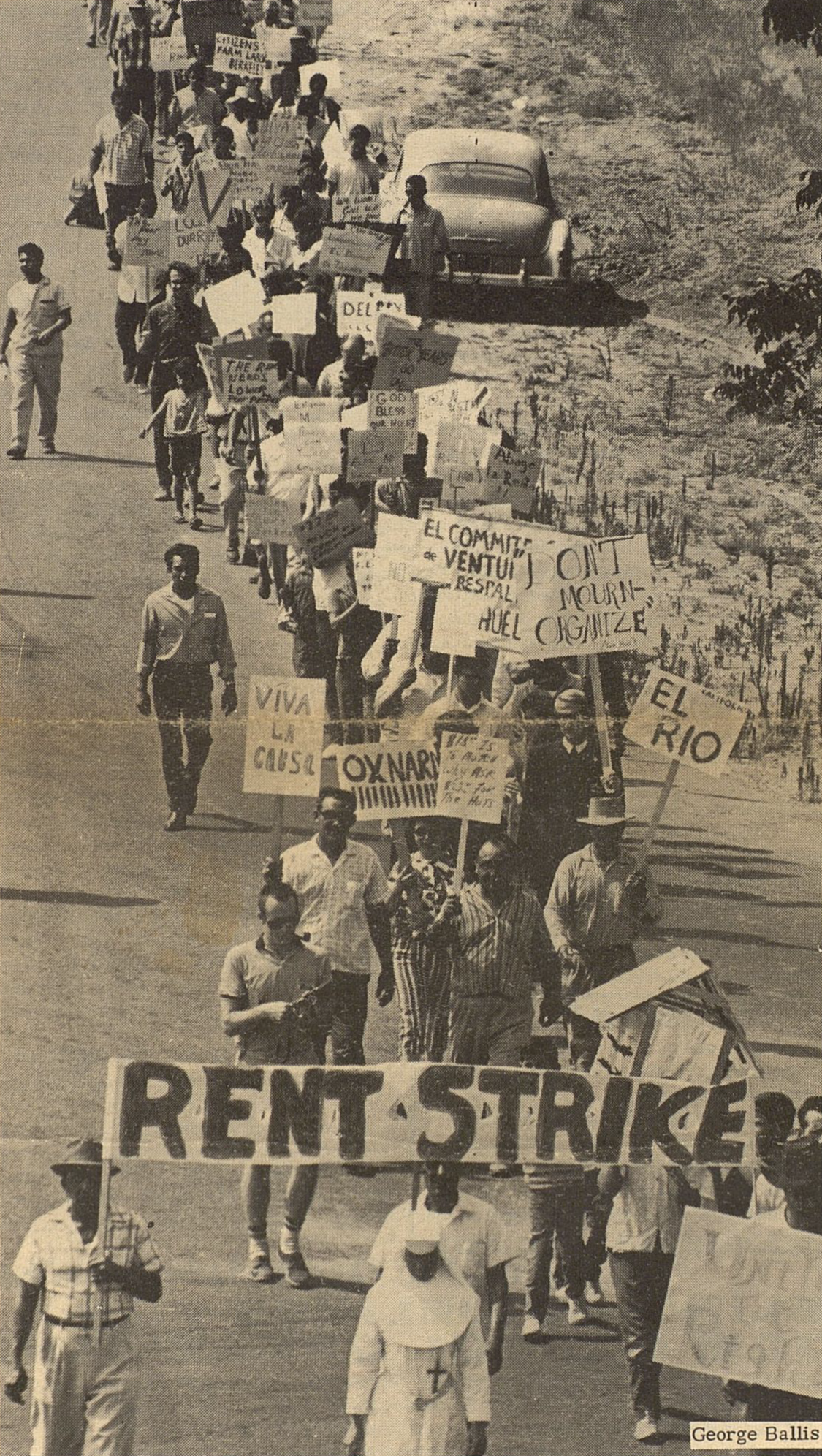
- March of farm workers from Linnell Labor Camp to Visalia in protest against rents being raised by the Housing Authority. Nearly 350 people participated
- Date: March 1965 - March 1968
- Location: Tulare County, California: Linnell Farm Labor Camp; Woodville Farm Labor Camp
- Caused by: Uninhabitable living conditions, Proposed rent increase
- Methods: Rent strike, Picketing
- Result: Cancellation of rent increases, Construction of new buildings

Parties
National Farm Workers Association; The California Migrant Ministry; Student Nonviolent Coordinating Committee (SNCC); Community Service Organization; AFSC Farm Labor Committee; Congress of Racial Equality (CORE)	Tulare County Housing Authority

Lead figures
Gilbert Padilla; Reverend Jim Drake; Reverend David Havens; Paul Jacobs (activist); Gary Bellow	Exec Director Ferris Sherman (Note: of the Tulare County Housing Authority); Chairman R.D. Dewhirst

The 1965-68 Tulare Labor Camps rent strike was conducted in 1965 in the United States by tenants of the Woodville and Linnell farm labor camps in California against rent increases by the Tulare County Housing Authority and the uninhabitable conditions of the tin huts they lived in.

The strikers consisted of the agricultural workers, headed by the National Farm Workers Association (NFWA) alongside support by numerous civil rights and student organizations. It lasted three years and successfully stopped the proposed rent increase, and led to the construction of new houses to replace the tin huts.

It also bolstered the membership and organizing of NFWA, would feed into the organizing behind the Delano grape strike and play a role in helping to publicize it.

== Background ==
One of the primary factors of the rent strike was the inhospitable living conditions for farm workers. In 1938 the Farm Security Administration built 440 one roomed tin shacks for farm workers in the Woodville and Linnell farm labor camps. All had tin roofs and either tin or wood siding. By 1940, six years before the dissolving of the administration, the FSA had been operating 18 camps in California and 56 camps nationwide for migrant workers.

Location of Farm Security Administration Migratory Labor Camps, July 1942
Region I:	Maryland	Mobile Camps: Hebron, Pocomoke City, Vienna, Westover
Region I:	New Jersey	Mobile Camps: Big Oak, Burlington, Swedesboro
Region IV	Virginia	Mobile Camps: Black Bay, Lynnhaven, Timberville
Region V	Florida	Everglades: S Canal Point, State Highway 143; Okeechobee: (Belle Glade, Unit 2, Black) -3.7 mi. S Belle Glade, State Highway 25; Osceola: (Belle Glade, Unit 1, White) - ¼ mi. E Chosen on county road NE Belle Glade, and ¾ mi. from State Highway 143 N Belle Glade; Pahokee: SE Canal Point, State Highway 194; Pompano: NW Pompano, U.S. Highway 1
Region VI	Arkansas	Springdale: Off U.S. Highway 540
Region VIII	Texas	Crystal City: N Crystal City, U.S. Highway; 83 Harlingen: S Harlingen, U.S. Highway 83; Lamesa: off U.S. Highway 87; McAllen: NE McAllen, U.S. Highway 83; Princeton: SE McKinney, State Highway 24; Raymondville: 2 mi. W Raymondville, U.S. Highway; 96 Robstown: 2 mi. N Robstown, State Highway 44; Sinton: ¼ mi. W Sinton, State Highway 44; Weslaco: at N end of town of Weslaco
Region IX	Arizona	Agua Fria: 16 mi. W Phoenix, State Highway 77; Eleven Mile Corner: 3½ mi. E Casa Grande and ½ mi. N of State Highway 84; Yuma: 12 mi. SW Yuma; Mobile Camps: Friendly Corners, Gilbert
Region IX	California	Arvin: 17 mi. SE Bakersfield, U.S. Highway 99; Brawley: at N end of town of Brawley; Ceres: at NW end of town of Ceres, 3 mi. SE Modesto, U.S. Highway 99; Firebaugh: at N end of town of Firebaugh; Gridley: 3 mi. E Gridley; Indio: 1 mi. SE Indio, U.S. Highway 99; Mineral King: 43 mi. S Fresno on U.S. Highway 99, left on State Highway 198, 3 mi. E Visalia; Shafter: 1½ mi. NW Shafter and 19 mi. NW; Bakersfield Thornton: at S end of town of Thornton; Tulare: 4 mi. SE Visalia, State Highway; 198 Westley: at W end of town of Westley; Windsor: 1 mi. W Windsor; Winters: 1 mi. NE Winters; Woodville: 7 mi. NW Porterville, State Highway 190; Yuba City: 1 mi. SE Yuba City; Mobile Camps: Brentwood, Santa Maria, Cupertino, Sebastopol, San Jacinto
Region XI	Idaho	Caldwell: 2 mi. W Caldwell, junction Highways 18 and 20; Twin Falls: 2 mi. S Twin Falls, Highway 26; Mobile Camps: Blackfoot, Payette-Ontario, Emmett, Pocatello, Jerome, Rupert, Marsing, Shelley, Donnelly, Sugar City, Nampa, Wilder
Region XI	Oregon	Yamhill: 4 mi. S Dayton, Highway 223 (Dayton-Amity cutoff); Mobile Camps: Athena, Nyssa, Brewster, The Dalles, Coburg, West Stayton, Gresham
Region XI	Washington	Granger: 2 mi. NW Granger, U.S. Highway 410; Walla Walla: 5 mi. SW Walla Walla, Oregon State Highway 11 (1 mi. N Oreg. Line); Yakima: 2 mi. W Union Gap on Ahtanum Road, U.S. Highway 410; Mobile Camps: Auburn, Dixie, Burlington, Kennewick, Dayton, Wapato

They were provided initially without charge to farm workers in 1938 by the FSA and the shacks were only planned to be used for 10 years. The housing was then leased to a Growers Association in 1948 for $1 (Note: (equivalent to $13 in 2025)) for the whole camp, who then charged rents as high as $5 (Note: (equivalent to $67 in 2025)) a week for each shelter for two years. In 1950 the shacks were passed to the Tulare County Housing Authority, who continued to charge rent.

The strike came at a time of massive change for the average agricultural worker in California, the Bracero Program, which existed from 1942 to 1962, had heavily suppressed the wages and labor power of agricultural workers. With its end brought an upswing in permanent residents, and more diverse population of families, while it had previously consisted of largely of single men through the program. This created further need for largely, family oriented housing. The program's end also led to greater leverage for the average agricultural worker in the US.

In 1963, Jim Drake and Gilbert Padilla would visit the camps to distribute free contraceptives. During this they were taken back by the living conditions. Padilla noted, “I was shocked to see those little shacks, those tin shacks…. It was a disgrace to have those people in those labor camps. Especially in those little tin shacks.”

By 1964 rents for the shacks were $18.50 for the first cabin, with an $5 additional cost for each extra cabin, up to $38 (Note: (equivalent to $187 to $394 in 2025)) a month, when rented by the same family. A max of 4 residents were allowed for each cabin. Some farm labor families had up to 8, 10, or 12 children which furthered the cost of rent.

On March 30, 1965, the Tulare County Authority announced a scheduled rent increase up to a 47% to go in effect in June, precipitating the rent strike. The rent for he first cabin would've increased to $25 (Note: (equivalent to $260 in 2025)) for the first cabin and $10 (Note: (equivalent to $104 in 2025)) for each additional cabin.

Following the announcement, Padilla stood on top of a car at the Woodville Farm Labor camp and convinced 300 tenants to rent strike in June, when the rent increase would go into effect.

The rent strike was not only the result of the organizing of Gilbert Padilla and Jim Drake, but also crucially supported by the alliance formed between the NFWA and SNCC in January 1965. After the two organized the strike, finding themselves poorly prepared, they called the San Francisco SNCC office to request the sending of organizers to help, which they did. The coverage of the strike and later march in the SNCC run paper The Movement would be of crucial importance to gain outside support.

Another key leader of the rent strike would emerge at this time; Pablo Espinoza who occasionally was employed by the TCHA to work in the camps, and was part of an extended family that lived in the Woodville camp, became a primary spokesperson for the rent strikers. He conversed a lot with Gilbert Padilla, picking up his politics.

Cancelling the rent increase was not the only goal of the strikers, improving the conditions of the housing was a principal crucial demand by them. The previously described shacks had no solid doors or windows, and no indoor plumbing or sewage. Each of the shacks were equipped with one electric outlet and one gas outlet.

The temperature inside the shacks became inhospitable during daytime. By about eight o'clock in the morning residents could no longer safely stay inside. As a result, the tenants had to cook their lunch before then at dawn, when they still had access to it and couldn't cook dinner until 7:30 to 8:00 pm, after the shacks had cooled down enough. Families would often place old wet blankets and mattresses on top of the shacks in an attempt to keep them cool.

"The weather is about a 100° outside and it's about 130° or 150° inside. We can't stay inside."

— Farm labor camp resident,

Gary Bellow, a lawyer and activist who often represented farm workers from the NFWA, in a 1999 oral history interview described their experience visiting the labor camps:

"You could always tell a kid that grew up in Linnell/Woodville because they had these open gas heaters and every kid that ever grew up in Linnell/Woodville had scars on their arms from falling against these open gas heaters. And, it needed -- we needed better housing."

— Gary Bellow,

As the huts had no plumbing, for access to water it had to be carried in five gallon jugs from shared fire hydrants that served 6-7 huts. In addition bathing and toilet facilities were communal, one toilet house existed for each 60 units of housing. The showers were only functional during part of the day, shutting down at 9:30pm every night.

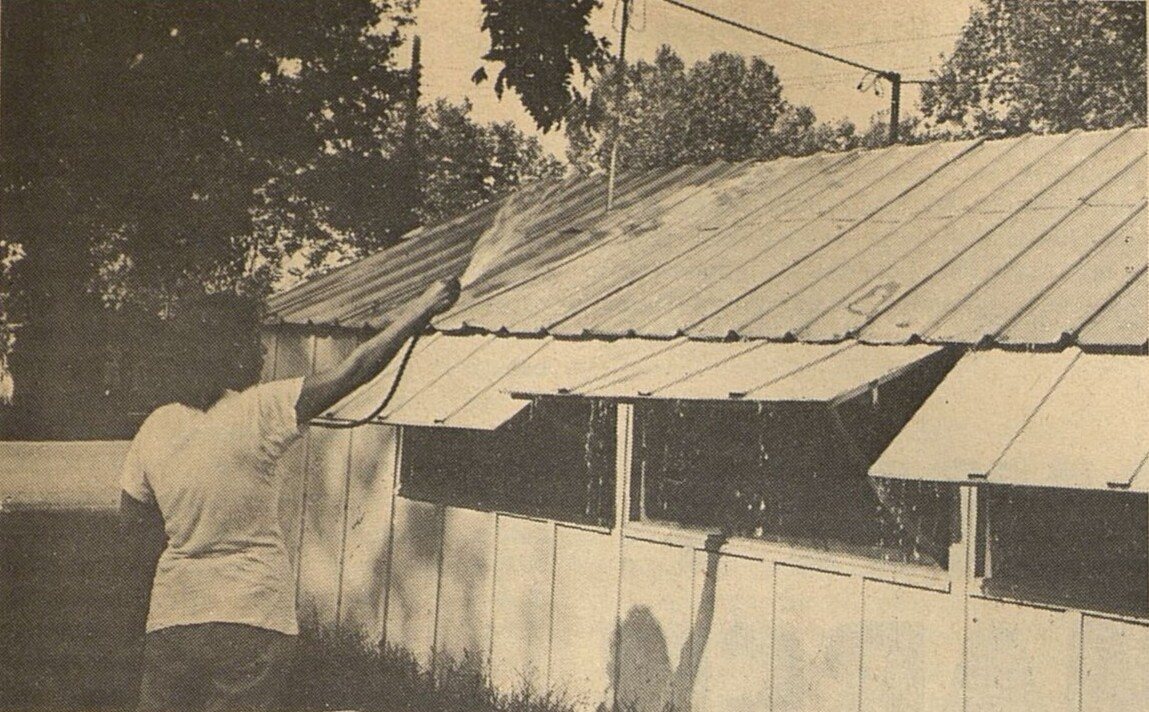
"Home Cooling System - You can't live in the Linnell shacks during the day. The temperature reaches 130 degrees inside." - The Movement, 1965

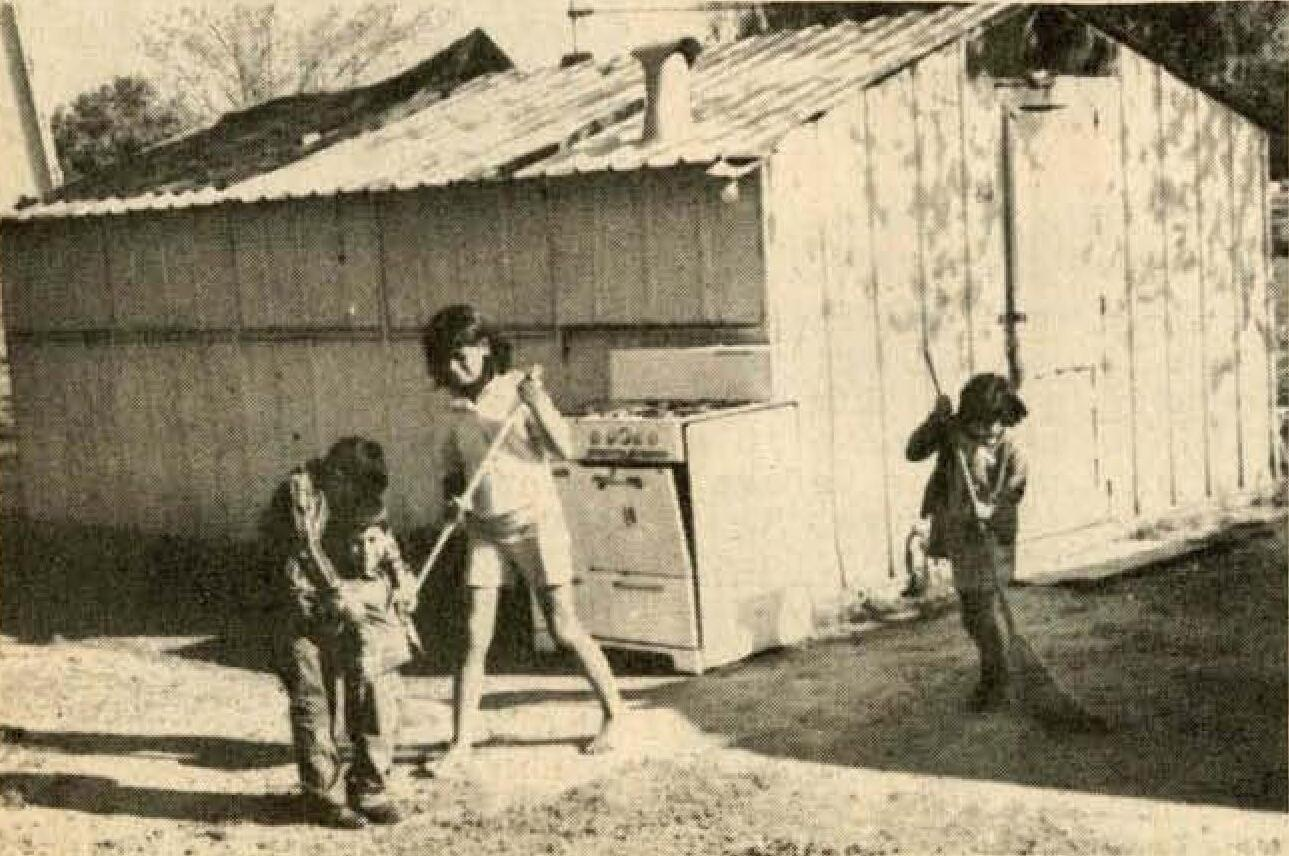
Tin house at Woodville labor camp

The labor camps also lacked sidewalks, causing deep mud during rainfall, making it difficult to access the fire hydrants for water. This aspect is of note, as it played role in inspiring the flood in the ending of The Grapes of Wrath, after the 1938 flood in Tulare County. Both farm labor camps were the kind John Steinbeck had modeled their setting off. A survey of the Woodville hut found 51 out of 55 huts had holes in the roof, walls or both.

Reverend Jim Drake would discover during organizing that the camp's were only built to last ten years and that they had been condemned by the Tulare County Health and Building Departments. Gilbert Padilla, Jim Drake and David Havens would then get legal advice from James Herndon. He advised them to have tenants pay into an escrow account instead of paying directly to TCHA, in order to prevent eviction.

The Tulare Housing Authority responded to residents, claiming that the rent raises were needed to fix the camps. While the residents replied that over the last 10 years, the housing commission a nonprofit by law, had made an excess profit of $130,000 (Note: (equivalent to $1,328,141 in 2025)) and that the camp didn't need to be fixed, it needed to be completely rebuilt.

On May 21, before the official withholding of rent by residents, 125 people attended the monthly meeting of the Tulare County Housing Authority to protest the proposed rent increase. Showing up before the meeting started with protest signs and picketing outside the meeting place, and then went inside when it started.

Chairman R.D. Dewhirst of the Housing authority, would place blame on the tenants, saying if they had been working instead of attending the meeting they would be making more money then the rent increase at the housing camps would cost them. Gilbert Padilla, would demand for the camp to be turned over to the renters, as Ferris R. Sherman, executive director of the Housing Authority, once claimed the renters could have the camps. Dewhirst claimed in response that it wasn't serious. Jim Drake accused the directors of enabling inhabitable housing to continue in the county by attempting to make it legally acceptable to raise rent in substandard housing.

== Strike ==
- Farmworker Movement Online Gallery- UC San Diego Library

Starting on the 1st of June, the day of the scheduled rent increase, 500 to 600 farm workers went on rent strike. They stopped paying rent to the housing authority and instead deposited their rent at the old rate into a local Bank of America account. The strike was organized by the National Farm Workers Association (Note: Which would later merge with AWOC, to become the United Farm Workers) alongside the California Migrant Ministry. Principally Gilbert Padilla of the NFWA and Jim Drake of the Migrant Ministry.

Excerpt around the Tulare rent strike from the 1966 documentary The Land is Rich by Harvey Richard

The strike featured significant collaboration of farm workers with other groups, such as the Student Nonviolent Coordinating Committee (SNCC) who heavily publicized the strike in their newspaper The Movement. The American Friends Service Committee would also sponsor college students to help families inside the camps, who themselves would also join the rent strike

Another group that helped the rent strike was the AFSC's Farm Labor Committee. They helped further publicize the strike through entering an agreement with the University of California Santa Cruz to provide students for editing of the newspaper Tenant News.

The Farm Labor Committee also invited Jesse Gray, an organizer of the National Organization of Tenant Rights to visit Tulare. His visit would play an important role in the subsequent creation of the tenants union in Tulare. Jesse Gray had previously led the 1963-1964 New York City rent strikes.

On July 16, the tenants organized a six-mile march from Linnell to Visalia to bring attention to their conditions. A nun led at the front of the march in a white tunic. (Note: Seen in above photo.)

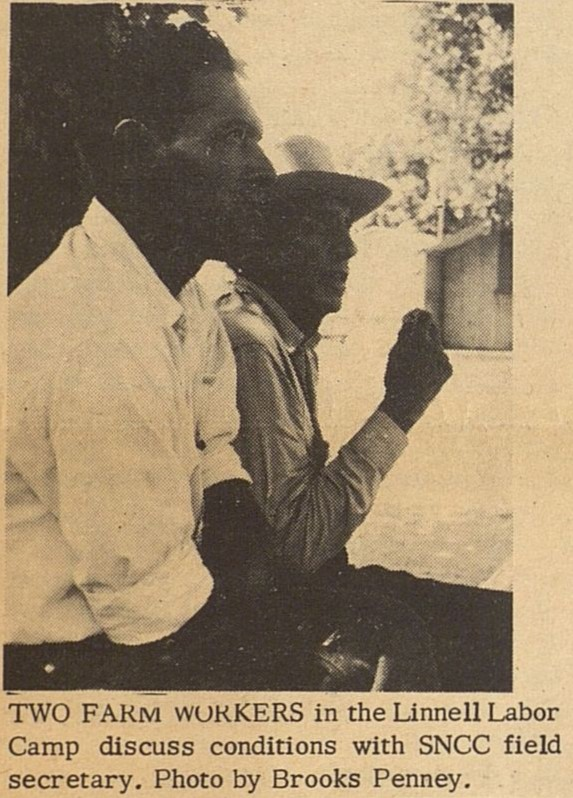
Two farm workers in the Linnell Labor Camp discuss conditions with SNCC field secretary.

Map of the march's major locations starting in the east at the Linnell Farm Labor Camp

Chris Hartmire of the California Migrant Ministry would be the one who had initially proposed the march, having marched in Selma 3 months earlier. In addition members of CORE's LA chapter, SNCC, Citizens for Farm Labor, the Welfare Rights Organization of Oakland, Student Committee for Agricultural Labor, and the California Migrant Ministry all had participants in the march. Those in the NFWA broadly viewed much of their struggle as foundationally intertwined with the civil rights struggle by Black Americans, as such cross-pollination between each movement was common.

In an editorial published on El Malcriado on July 9, this intertwined struggle for both Mexican-Americans and Black Americans was noted,

"In the rent strike, we again showed what we have learned from the black movement. We learned that when we unite, we can make the government respond, changing the arbitrary ways it acts toward the poor. The Tulare County Housing Authority fears the power of organized people."

The rent strikers had several proposals for the labor camps following the start of the strike. They suggested running the camp on a collective basis through a tenant council. In addition they demanded the complete investigation of the camp's financial procedure and financial accounts.

Page spread from El Malcriado, the unofficial NFWA paper, with a call to action to its readers to help publicize the strike.

The marchers, consisting of tenants and supporters, were headed towards the regularly scheduled meeting place of the Tulare County Housing Authority. Once they arrived at the offices, they were told the meeting was not being held today, because not enough member's of the housing authority were present.

Then the march continued to the Visalia Presbyterian Church, where the workers held a rally where Labor Journalist Paul Jacobs spoke in support of the rent strike, and a petition was signed by the strikers. The petition read as follows:

"Residents of Woodville and Linnell who marched six miles to meet the Tulare Housing Authority and who were ignored, ask the Tulare County Board of Supervisors to intervene and ask them to lower the rent in the substandard housing that they own and operate."

After this they continued to the Tulare County Courthouse where they submitted the petition. On the event Padilla noted in retrospect, "[this] was one of the first marches of Chicano farmworkers."

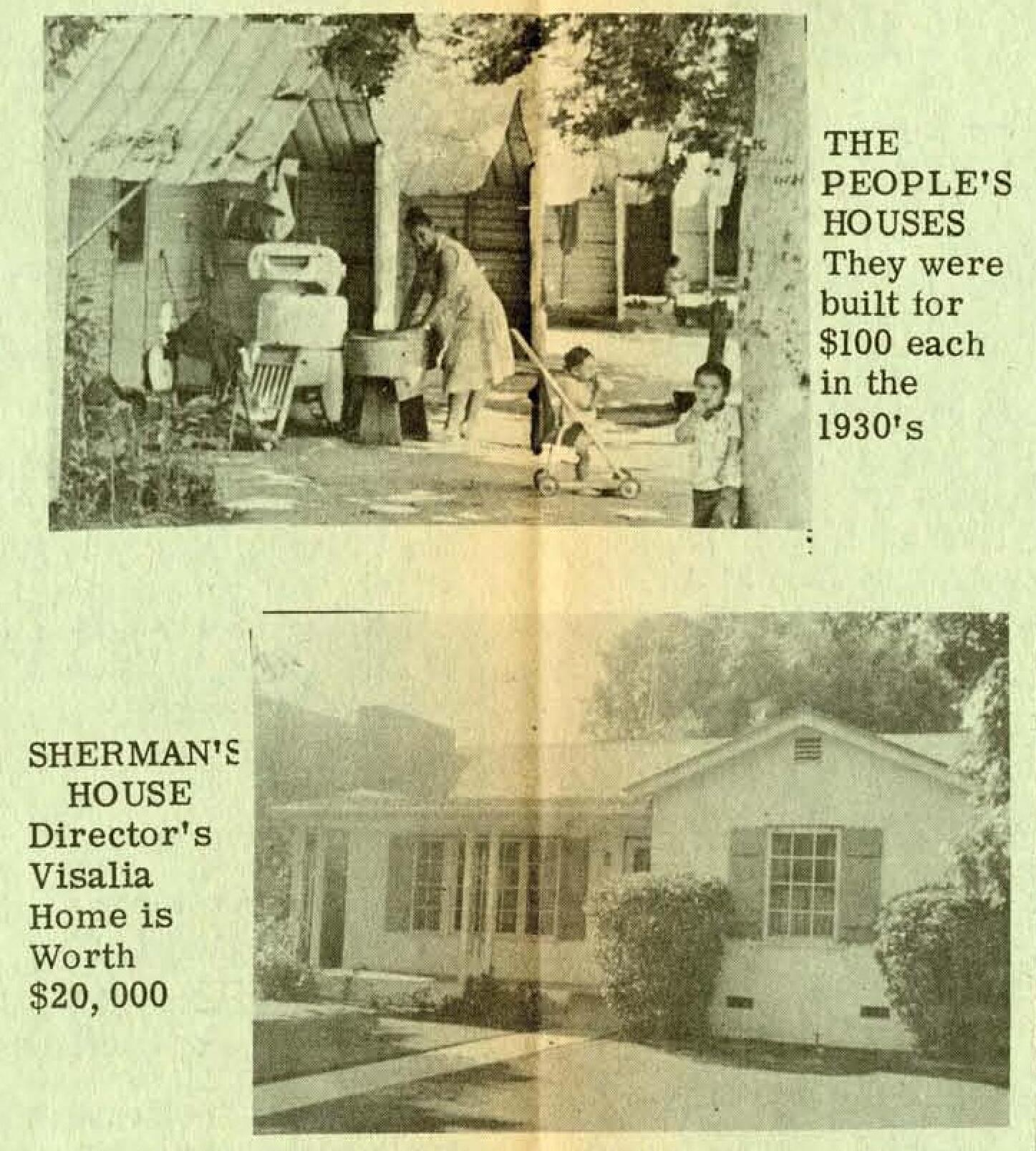
Excerpt from El Malcriado criticizing the Tulare County Housing Authority Director

In a letter written by Gilbert Padilla -intended as template of the basic events for those to send complaints to California Gov Edmund G. Brown- he would criticize the Linnell Farm Labor camp manager claiming:

"[the camp manager had] handed out [pamphets] while working for the Authority, which attack the United Nations, the President of the United States, the National Council of Churches, and 'Martin Luther King and His Civil Rights Urinators.' The fact that the Housing Authority employs a man with such segregationistic and anti-American ideas symbolizes the degree of corruption found in the Tulare County Housing Authority."

On August 14, 1965, it was announced that the Assembly Industrial Relations Committee would investigate the rent strikes at the farm labor camps. Chairman, Mervyn M. Dymally said of the issue:

"The fact that this county housing authority raised rents for these tin shack homes of the poorest people in our abundantly rich San Joaquin Valley, in the face of a reserve fund surplus of more than $130,000, and refuses to discuss or negotiate the issues involved with the tenants raises a reaI question about local housing authority operations"

On August 19, the Tulare County Farmers Association called for TCHA to take immediate steps to replace the metal hut housing with more habitable conditions. Public pressure and the rent strike had also led Sherman, of the housing authority and the rent strikers to sit down and discuss, with two people from the state government to mediate. No significant progress was made.

That same month, the County Health and Building inspectors investigated the camps and determined they were not fit for human habitation, publicly condemning the shacks, and the operation to be illegal. Ferris Sherman and Earl Rouse, heads of the Housing Authority still attempted to evict the protestors through the courts. The inspectors found 51 building and health violations. However, in September, Judge Paul Eymen of the Tulare County Superior Court ruled in favor of the tenants, ruling no rent increase or eviction was justified and that the housing authority had to repair or replace the housing within six months.

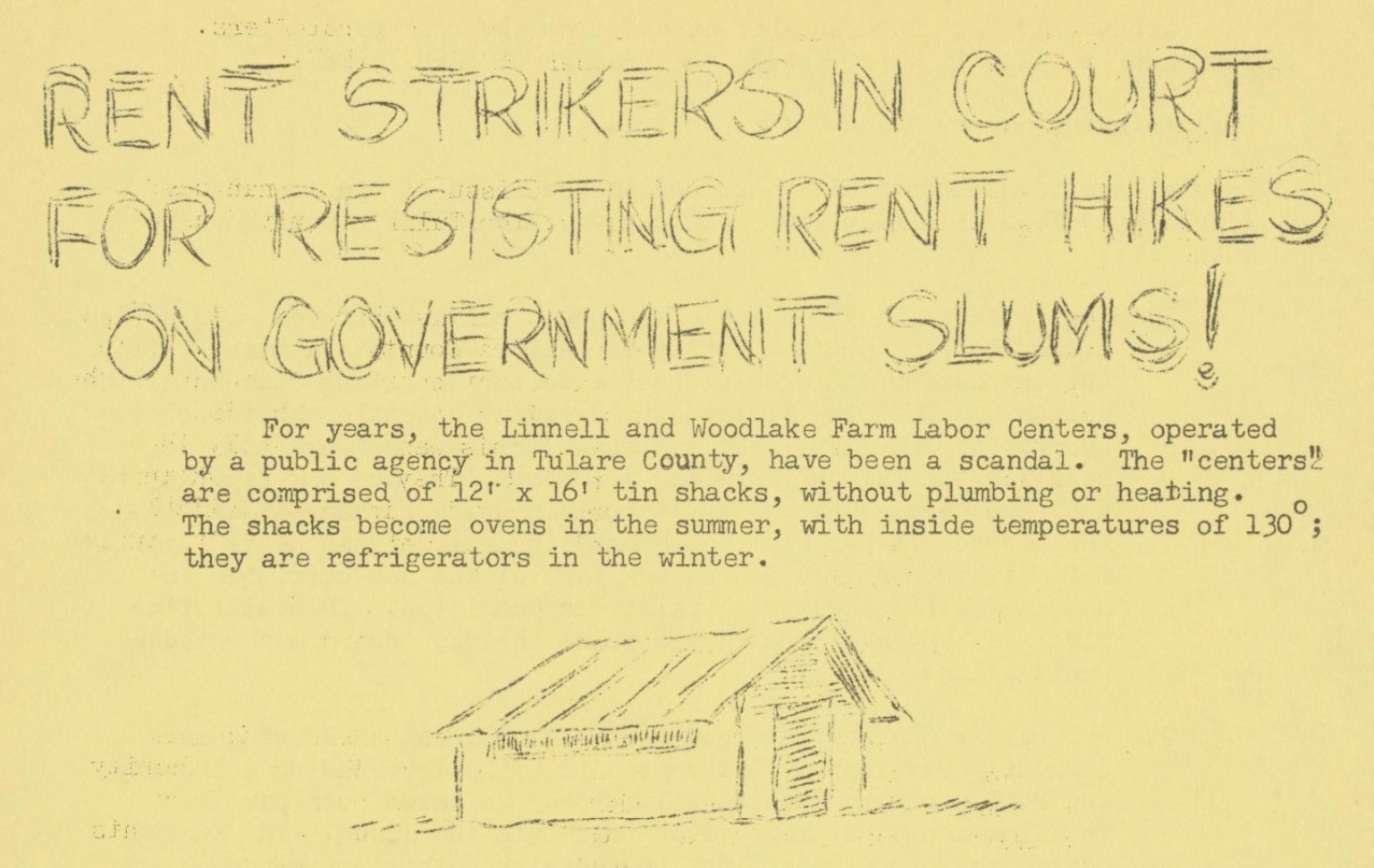
Excerpt from September 1965 Farm Labor Vol. 3, No. 4 Magazine Issue.

The tenants were represented by tenants Manuel Ponce, John Delgado and Daniel Delgado. With lawyers James Herndon and Carlos LaRoche defending them in court. The tenants agreed tentatively to pay back rent, at the $18 old rent (and $5 for each additional cabin), from the escrow account, the Tenants' Trust Fund, which it had been being paid into during the strike.

The rent strike had cost the Tulare County Housing Authority over $7,000 (equivalent to $71,515 in 2025) up to this point. Tenants also stated, that if the conditions didn't improve, the strike would shortly resume. Additionally the County Board of Supervisors specifically set the six-month deadline for a plan or start on building better housing, with criminal negligence charges also being considered.

The rent strikers, in the face of no improvements, did not pay the back rent until later in March 1968 when a final settlement was reached.

By 1966, $1.2 million would be given to the TCHA by the federal government to construct livable housing. Half of which was given and the other half being lent with an expectation of repayment.

Following concerns of the condemned huts being torn down, leaving the tenants nowhere to live, the board members expanded the grace period three more months from when it was set to expire on July 1, 1967. Thus preventing the Tulare County Housing Authority's planned eviction. 200 new dwellings would be set to replace the huts, with the project contract to be awarded on September 25. In addition tenants had concerns about the planned monthly rent for the new buildings, $60 (Note: (equivalent to $579 in 2025)) a month which they would be unable to pay.

Then in March 1968 the rent strike had officially concluded, with a final written agreement reached:

- 1. No striker will be discriminated against in the new housing.
- 2. The old housing will stand until the families can move into the new project.
- 3. None of the back rent increase will be paid by those who were on strike.
- 4. The new rent will be $20 per month, lowering the rent for even the tenants who were not on strike.
- 5. There will be no evictions even though the Authority has the legal right to evict the strikers.

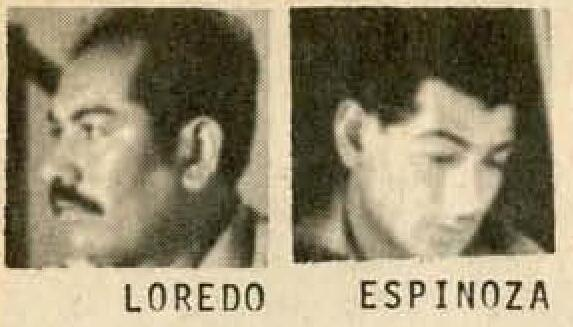
Tenant leaders, Ernesto Loredo & Pablo Espinoza

This agreement reversed the proposed new rent of $60 for the new units, instead to be set at $20 a month. Ernesto Loredo, leader for the last two years of the rent strike, noted:

"They had us beaten several times, but because the people were tough we were able to force the hand of the Authority. We have shown them that farm workers are not weak just because we are poor. When we stick together for a single goal, we have a power equal to any."

— Ernesto Loredo

== Aftermath ==
The rent strike successfully reversed the proposed rent increases and led to the construction of permanent habitable houses. The organizing established from the strike remained and tenants continued to challenge the housing authority when rent raises and fees they felt were unjust were attempted, including in 1971, 1974 and 1985.

The strike played an important role in catalyzing farm worker families within the camps becoming a core of NFWA support and involvement. Doug Adair, the principal editor of El Malcriado became involved with the UFW through the rent strike. Gary Bellow, a lawyer who provided legal advice with the rent strike case, noted:

"...many of them joined the Union after that because they liked the experience of collective action, they saw what it could do with each other."

— Gary Bellow

Cesar Chavez would also later describe the effect of the rent strike:

Short of getting into an agricultural strike, the rent strike, which lasted through the summer, was one of the best ways of educating farm workers that there was a union concerned with their economic interests. It was one of the first demonstrations where the black eagle flew.

— Cesar Chavez

In August 1965, while the rent strike was still ongoing, the roots of the grape strike begun, at Rancho Blanco. Many who had participated in the rent strike would come to support or participate in the labor strike, further fueling it.

=== Modern Day ===
==== Linnell and Woodville ====
Both farm labor camps exist to this day as low income subsidized housing for agricultural workers, buildings constructed due to the rent strike; Each with 2, 3 and 4 bedroom units of modern housing, alongside community centers and recreational areas.

However, since 2023, Tulare County Housing Authority (TCHA) staff have been accused of threatening residents on housing rental assistance with ICE, questioning the immigration documents of families within the camps and subsequently sending 17 families 3 day eviction notices, $600 fees, alongside court and attorney costs for noncompliance in the Linnell Labor Camp. The Central Valley Empowerment Alliance (CVEA) and Unidad Popular Benito Juarez (UPBJ), had gathered documentation for over 50 families evicted or threatened with eviction across four different Labor Camps managed by the TCHA.

The potential motivation of the TCHA new policy of tenant intimidation is speculated to be due to new knowledge by the TCHA that H-2A visa holders also qualified for rent spacing in the camps. Which has been seen as a preferable labor source by agribusiness instead of the farmworkers currently in the labor camps that had typically lived inside the US for years. This info was revealed by TCHA members in a March 2023 meeting, describing that the USDA had informed them of this fact. This was due to a federal amendment to the Housing Act of 1949 passed in 2018 that opened the camps for use by agribusiness growers to use for their H-2A workers.

H-2A visa holders are considered especially vulnerable, dependent entirely on employment to stay inside the country and can be easily fired for protesting unfair conditions. Agribusiness is required to house the workers during their stay. Farm-worker housing in California is very over crowded with around 2 people per room on average.

In March 2023, two staff of the TCHA were removed due to the public outrage at the allegations of discrimination and intimidation against farm workers in the camps.

==== Farm housing conditions along the broader West Coast ====
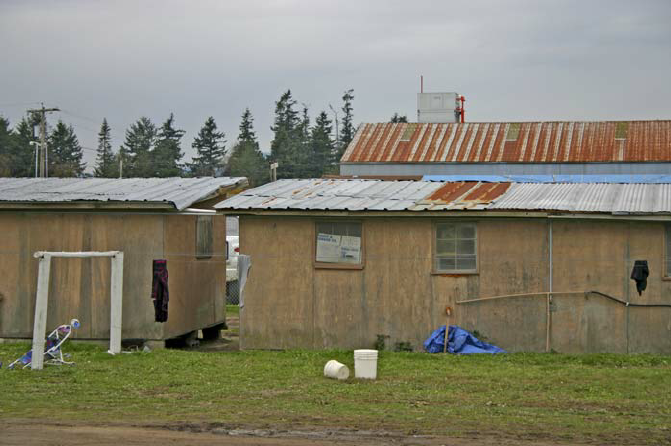
Labor camp on Tanaka brothers farm. Washington State, Skagit Valley circa 2003-2004

To this day poor housing conditions elsewhere alongside the West Coast of the United States still remains a problem inflicted on migrant farm workers, with conditions similar to that of the Linnell and Woodville Labor Camps prior to the strike.

One example is the Tanaka Farms (Note: Not to be confused with the Tanaka Farms in California. It's unclear whether they are entirely unrelated agribusiness or the same one.) in Washington State's Skagit Valley as of 2013, where the living conditions of migrant farm workers in company housing is poor. The tin roofed shacks (Note: Pictured above on mobile view, and pictured to the right on desktop view.) on average are about 10 by 15 feet across, with one to two mattress, one small refrigerator, two camping-style gas stoves, one table with a bench, and a small sink with two different hoses for hot and cold water respectively. Its unclear whether the Tanaka farm labor are remnants of the RA/FSA Labor camp constructions. By 1940, six years before the dissolving of the administration, the FSA had been operating 18 camps in California and 56 camps nationwide for migrant workers.

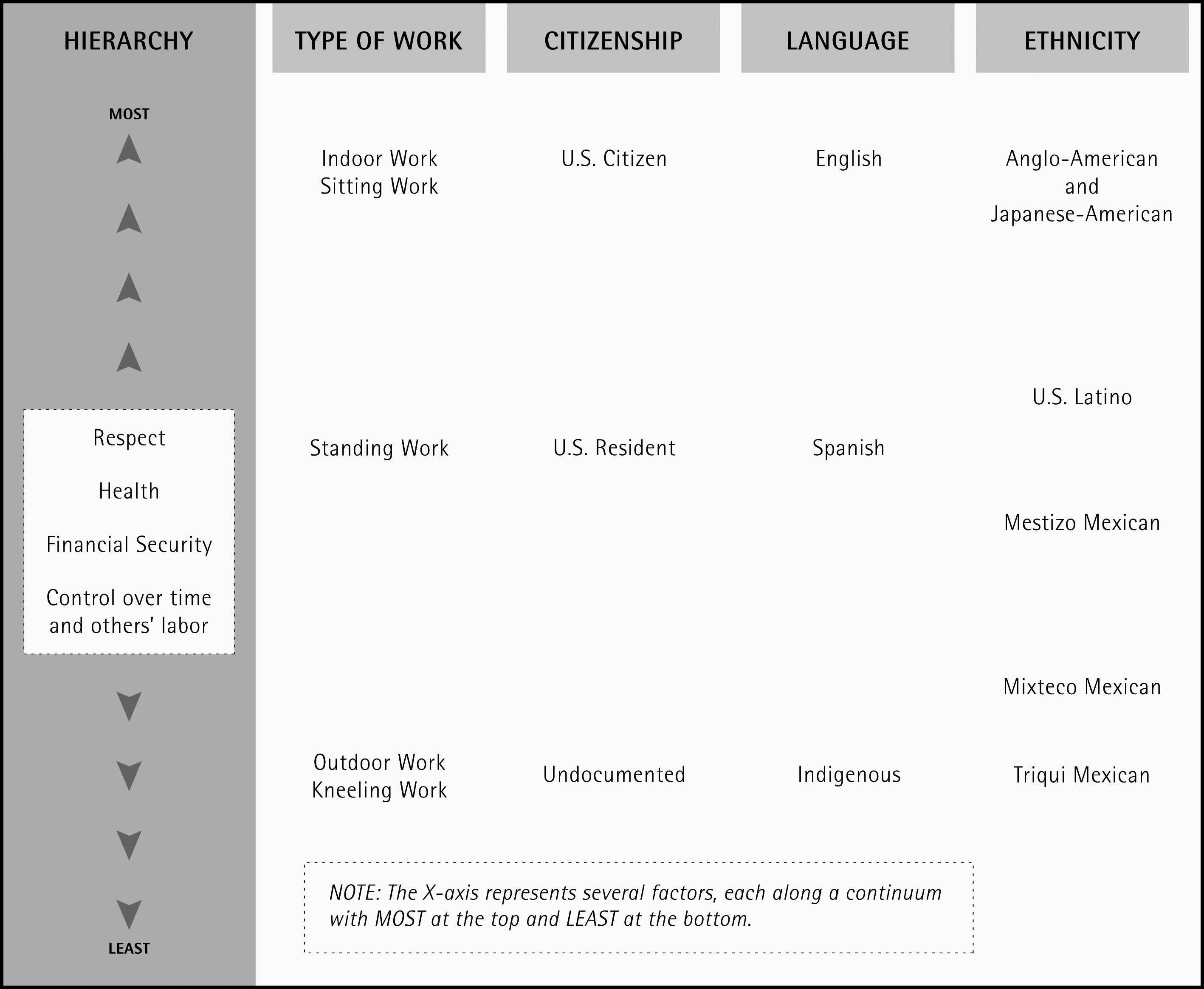
Farm labor hierarchy, per Seth M. Holmes 2006

Within Tanaka Farms, there exists different tiers of housing quality, based on ones position in the farm labor hierarchy. The farm labor hierarchy is defined heavily by ethnic categories. As for certain job positions, some ethnic groups are de facto barred from working in them, even if exceptions exist.

Farm camp tiers at the Tanaka Farms
Camp One Location: A 100 feet from road. Housing: Has heating & insulation, wooden roofs under tin metal sheets. Number: 50 year-round workers. Makeup: Field bosses, almost entirely Latino US citizens, with a single Mixteco field boss from Oaxaca	Camp Two Location: 100s of feet from road. Housing: No heating or insulation, wooden roofs under tin metal sheets. Number: 100 migratory workers. Makeup: Higher paid apple & raspberry pickers, with some strawberry pickers. Primarily undocumented Spanish speaking mestizo (semi-indigenous) Mexicans, with some Mixtexo and a few Triqui indigenous farm workers.	Camp Three Location: Back-road, far from main road Housing: No heating or insulation, tin roofs with no wood underneath. Number: 250 migratory workers Makeup: Majority strawberry pickers, primarily Triqui indigenous people, who most only speak Trique, & are not fluent in Spanish or English. Some indigenous Mixtexo workers, who speak Mixtec with scattered fluency in Spanish.

The farm labor shacks at Tananka farms have plywood walls with the above described tin roofs; Some with wood underneath the tin roofs, others without; Some with heating and insulation, and others with none, depending on which of the three camps a worker was in. Each shack also had two windows on each side, some broken and the vast majority covered with cardboard. The shacks become inhospitable during summer days, with the insides reaching 100 °F and higher, while during fall nights becoming freezing, below 32 °F from the damp and cold air. The roads around the camp are dirt, becoming deep mud during rain and bellowing out storms of dusts during dry days from cars passing.

In Camp three, where the majority of the farm workers living in company housing lived, existed the housing units called 'Cabinas' 10 by 12 foot tin shacks, similar to that of the Linnell and Woodville shacks prior to the strike. With no heating or insulation, no wood underneath the tin roof sheets, and holes and cracks throughout that wind blows through easily, especially at night. The tin roofs conduct heat like an oven during the summer. Bathrooms and showers were shared in a separate large plywood building with concrete floors.

Today having access to habitable humane living conditions, remains an issue for migrant farm workers. With many still systematical coerced by structural conditions, so that inhumane living conditions remain the only housing option available to them, with others closed off. Although exceptions of higher quality housing such as the Linnell and Woodville Labor camps in the modern day do exist.

== See also ==
- 2024 Kansas City metropolitan area rent strike
