= Zermeño =

Zermeño is a surname of Spanish origin. Notable people with the surname include:

- Adrián Zermeño (born 1979), Mexican former professional footballer
- Andrew Zermeño (born 1935), American cartoonist
- Cinthia Zermeño Moore, Mexican-born American politician
- Jorge Zermeño Infante (born 1949), Mexican lawyer and politician
- Paloma Zermeño (born 1995), American-born Mexican footballer and beach soccer player

== See also ==
- Ernst Zermelo (1871–1953), German logician and mathematician
