= Woodville Farm Labor Camp, California =

Woodville Farm Labor Camp
- Unincorporated community Census-designated place
- Location within California Location within the United States
- Coordinates: 36°4′59″N 119°8′52″W
- Country: United States
- State: California
- County: Tulare

Area
  - Total: 0.19 sq mi (0.49 km^{2})
  - Land: 0.19 sq mi (0.49 km^{2})
  - Water: 0 sq mi (0.0 km^{2})
- Elevation: 368 ft (112 m)

Population (2020)
  - Total: 729
  - Density: 3,900/sq mi (1,500/km^{2})
- Time zone: UTC-8 (Pacific (PST))
  - Summer (DST): UTC-7 (PDT)
- ZIP Code: 93257 (Porterville)
- Area code: 559
- FIPS code: 06-86489
- GNIS feature ID: 2813334

Woodville Farm Labor Camp is an unincorporated community and census-designated place (CDP) in Tulare County, California, United States. It is 8 miles (13 km) west of Porterville and 18 miles (29 km) southeast of Tulare.

As of the 2020 census, Woodville Farm Labor Camp had a population of 729.

== History ==
Woodville originated as one of the Migratory Labor Camps that were built in the 1930s by the Farm Security Administration. Whilst these camps were intended to improve living conditions, the residents were still housed in rudimentary shacks decades later, and confronted with rising rents, which led to the Tulare labor camps rent strike in 1965.

== Demographics ==
Historical population
Census	Pop.	Note	%±
2020	729		—
U.S. Decennial Census; 1850–1870 1880-1890; 1900 1910 1920; 1930 1940 1950; 1960 1970 1980; 1990 2000 2010; 2020

Woodville Farm Labor Camp first appeared as a census designated place in the 2020 U.S. census.

=== 2020 Census ===
Woodville Farm Labor Camp CDP, California – Racial and ethnic composition Note: the US Census treats Hispanic/Latino as an ethnic category. This table excludes Latinos from the racial categories and assigns them to a separate category. Hispanics/Latinos may be of any race.
Race / Ethnicity (NH = Non-Hispanic)	Pop 2020	% 2020
White alone (NH)	4	0.55%
Black or African American alone (NH)	0	0.00%
Native American or Alaska Native alone (NH)	1	0.14%
Asian alone (NH)	0	0.00%
Pacific Islander alone (NH)	0	0.00%
Other race alone (NH)	0	0.00%
Mixed race or Multiracial (NH)	0	0.00%
Hispanic or Latino (any race)	724	99.31%
Total	729	100.00%

== Education ==
The community is served by the Woodville Elementary School District and by the Porterville Unified School District for grades 9–12.
