= Theodor Jung =

American photographer

Theodor Jung (May 29, 1906 in Austria-Hungary – February 19, 1996 in California) was an American photographer, best known for his work with the Farm Security Administration, one of Franklin Delano Roosevelt's New Deal programs. Hired for the agency in 1935, when it was still called the Resettlement Administration, he photographed life in the Great Depression. He left the agency the following year and served as photographer for the Consumers Council, another government agency, and the Consumers' Guide. Later in life he served as art director and photographer for a number of publications and advertising agencies.
