= Linnell Camp, California =

Linnell Camp
- census-designated place
- Location of Linnell Camp in Tulare County, California.

- Position in California.
- Coordinates: 36°18′32″N 119°13′21″W
- Country: United States
- State: California
- County: Tulare

Area
  - Total: 0.117 sq mi (0.303 km^{2})
  - Land: 0.117 sq mi (0.303 km^{2})
  - Water: 0 sq mi (0 km^{2}) 0%
- Elevation: 358 ft (109 m)

Population (2020)
  - Total: 696
  - Density: 5,950/sq mi (2,300/km^{2})
- Time zone: UTC-8 (Pacific (PST))
  - Summer (DST): UTC-7 (PDT)
- ZIP code: 93292
- Area code: 559
- GNIS feature ID: 2585430

Linnell Camp (also known as Tulare Migrant Camp as it were called in older photographs) is a census-designated place (CDP) in Tulare County, California, United States. Linnell Camp sits at an elevation of 358 feet (109 m). The 2020 United States census reported Linnell Camp's population as 696.

== History ==
Linnell Camp originated as one of the Migratory Labor Camps that were built in the 1930s by the Farm Security Administration. Whilst these camps were intended to improve living conditions, the residents were still housed in rudimentary shacks decades later, and confronted with rising rents, which led to the Tulare labor camps rent strike in 1965.

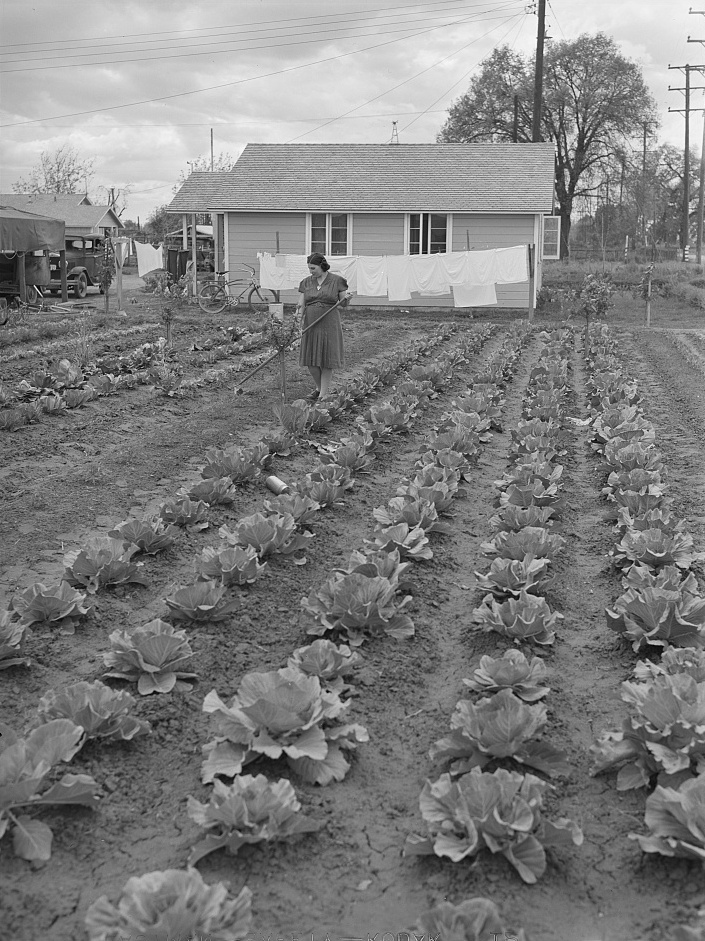
Vegetable Garden in Farm Linnell Labor Camp, while it was under control of the federal government. (1940)

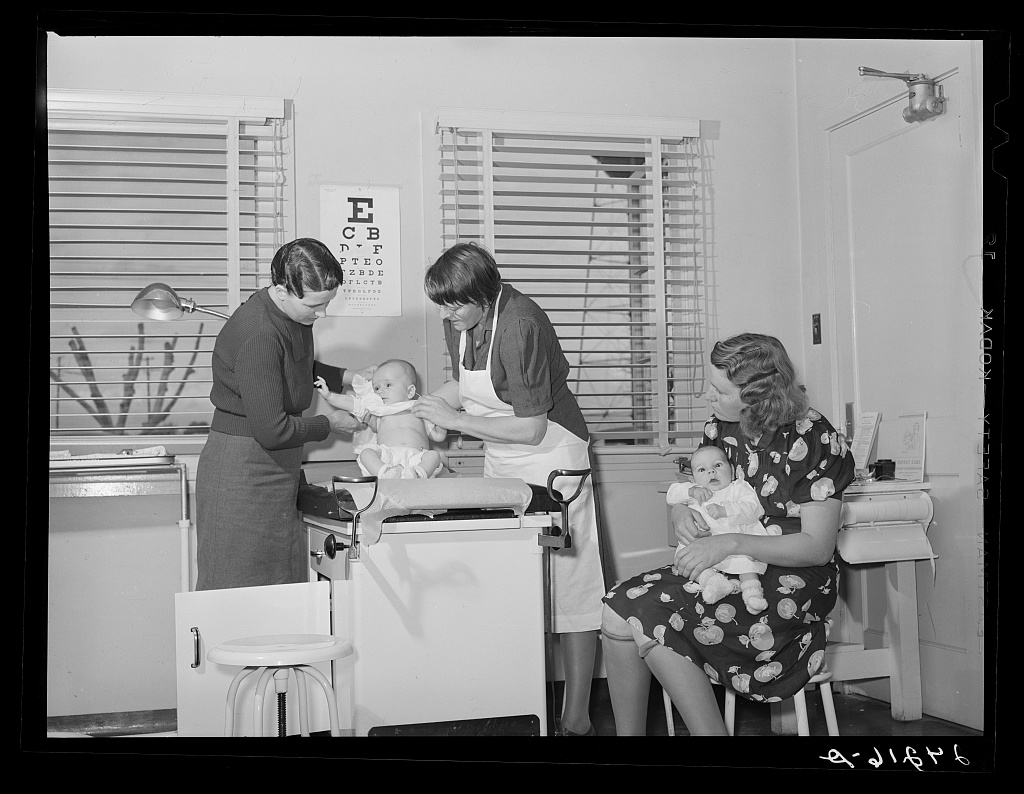
Well baby clinic at farm labor camp (1940)

== Geography ==
According to the United States Census Bureau, the CDP covers an area of 0.1 square mile (0.3 km^{2}), all land.

== Demographics ==
Historical population
Census	Pop.	Note	%±
2010	849		—
2020	696		−18.0%
U.S. Decennial Census; 1850–1870 1880-1890; 1900 1910 1920; 1930 1940 1950; 1960 1970 1980; 1990 2000 2010

Linnell Camp first appeared as a census designated place in the 2010 U.S. census.

The 2020 United States census reported that Linnell Camp had a population of 696. The population density was 5,948.7 inhabitants per square mile (2,296.8/km^{2}). The racial makeup of Linnell Camp was 110 (15.8%) White, 0 (0.0%) African American, 17 (2.4%) Native American, 0 (0.0%) Asian, 0 (0.0%) Pacific Islander, 427 (61.4%) from other races, and 142 (20.4%) from two or more races. Hispanic or Latino of any race were 691 persons (99.3%).

The whole population lived in households. There were 166 households, out of which 105 (63.3%) had children under the age of 18 living in them, 126 (75.9%) were married-couple households, 4 (2.4%) were cohabiting couple households, 18 (10.8%) had a female householder with no partner present, and 18 (10.8%) had a male householder with no partner present. 13 households (7.8%) were one person, and 7 (4.2%) were one person aged 65 or older. The average household size was 4.19. There were 151 families (91.0% of all households).

The age distribution was 279 people (40.1%) under the age of 18, 70 people (10.1%) aged 18 to 24, 187 people (26.9%) aged 25 to 44, 116 people (16.7%) aged 45 to 64, and 44 people (6.3%) who were 65 years of age or older. The median age was 24.5 years. For every 100 females, there were 87.1 males.

There were 190 housing units at an average density of 1,623.9 units per square mile (627.0 units/km^{2}), of which 166 (87.4%) were occupied. Of these, 21 (12.7%) were owner-occupied, and 145 (87.3%) were occupied by renters.

== Education ==
The CDP is served by the Visalia Unified School District.
