= Gilbert Padilla =

American labor leader and civil rights activist

- Born: December 1927 (age 98); Los Banos, California, U.S.
- Occupations: Labor leader; Civil rights activist
- Spouse: Esther Padilla

Gilbert Padilla (born December 1927) is an American labor leader and civil rights activist. Along with Cesar Chavez and Dolores Huerta, Padilla co-founded the National Farm Workers Association (NFWA), which eventually merged with the Agricultural Workers Organizing Committee (AWOC) to become the United Farm Workers of America (UFW).

In his position as Chavez's right-hand man, he served as vice president of the NWFA and then secretary-treasurer in the UFW. He helped to build the UFW through organizing union membership drives, boycotts, and strikes. In 1965, Padilla was the center of the Tulare labor camps rent strike. He and Jim Drake challenged the California state government for a sudden rent hike in labor camps where the buildings were long past their demolition date; it helped garner attention for the Delano grape strike later in the year.

== Early life ==
Padilla was born in Los Banos, California. His parents had moved there two years prior. The family lived in a labor camp called San Juan Camp and, consequently, Padilla spent his early years watching his parents work in the fields. During World War II, Padilla and his brothers enlisted in the army, where he served with the U.S. Army, 1st Cavalry Division in Japan.

== Activism ==
After returning home from the war in the 1940s, Padilla returned home to Los Banos to find that employment opportunities were scarce due to the presence of Mexican braceros in the fields. He found that the foreman of the fields was offering lower wages than what the braceros received. Incensed, he left.

In 1955, he met Cesar Chavez and began a decades-long partnership with him. Living in Hanford, California and working part-time as a dry cleaner and onion gleaner, Padilla was at first uninterested in joining the Community Service Organization (CSO), thinking that it was nothing more than a "social club" with temporary goals. A meeting with Chavez and Peter B. Garcia, the President of the Hanford Community Services Organization, that included the discussion of the improvement of farm worker conditions, helped Padilla to change his mind.

The CSO was primarily focused on voter registration and while it did have housing and education committees, there was no specific group that addressed the plight of farm workers. Chavez worked to establish such a committee in the CSO by establishing CSO chapters in rural communities where the farm workers made up a large portion of the population; Padilla himself was sent to Stockton, where he got a grant that allowed him to study housing conditions of the local farm workers. At the next CSO convention in 1962, Chavez's farm worker committee proposal was shot down, leading him to resign from his director position and thus, his salary to support his family. Padilla, who also relied on a CSO wages to support his family, was scared by Chavez's obstinacy. Nonetheless, he followed Chavez to resign and they establish their own organization by visiting all the rural CSO chapters to prepare them for Chavez's new pursuit.

National Farm Workers Association (NFWA) (Note: Later to merge with the AWOC to become the United Farm Workers) rent strike in response to the Tulare County Housing Authority raising their rents. (1965)

In September 1962, the National Farm Workers Association (NFWA) was created. It was initially set up based on CSO administrative structures with Chavez as president and Padilla as vice president. Padilla ended up finding a new source of funding via Fred Ross and the IAF. In January 1965, Padilla was hired by the Reverend Jim Drake to work with the Migrant Ministry in Porterville. By May, Drake and Padilla were organizing farm worker families living in the area's Woodville and Linnell labor camps in a rent strike.

The workers were living in shabby tin houses, freezing in winter and sweltering in summer, that were meant to be torn down by 1947, but the California state government paid no attention to this and continued to charge monthly rent without trying to update the conditions. The strike succeeded and the government agreed to construct better buildings on the same property for the farm workers.

In August 1965, the first grape strike was held at Rancho Blanco, which was not too far from Porterville. Many of those who had participated in the rent strike came to support the new effort, including Drake, farm workers, LeRoy Chatfield, and college students that Padilla had gotten to know. To bring more attention to the situation, Padilla went against Drake's advice and publicized the strike in The Fresno Bee. Chavez, who was hospitalized, did not participate. He later berated Padilla for deliberately waiting until he was sick to take action.

In the following years, Padilla willingly uprooted his family to move from place to place. In December 1965, he went to Los Angeles to set up the Schenley boycott; in 1966 he worked on the election in El Paso, Texas where the NWFA won an election for the first time.

Meanwhile, the Agricultural Workers Organizing Committee (AWOC), a Filipino farm worker organization, clashed with the NFWA, whose farm laborer goals were seen as intruding upon their territory. Chavez and Padilla worked out the details with Larry Itliong to merge the groups for mutual benefit. In 1973, Padilla was elected secretary-treasurer of the newly-formed UFW.

Chavez became increasingly paranoid and controlling. He began to purge the union of those who he felt were communist or secretly plotting against him. One by one, key members from the early days began leaving and destabilizing the core group. Padilla himself left in 1980, disappointed that his loyalty was being questioned.

== Personal life ==
Padilla married twice. His second wife, Esther Negrete Padilla, was highly involved in his labor organization activities and for a time, worked the fields with her eldest step-son to support Padilla. She was first Latina elected to the Fresno, California City Council where she served a four-year term representing District 5, a predominately Latino area, from 1991-1995. She died in 2013. As of 2018, Padilla resided near family in Fresno. Former huelgistas and friends visited and stayed in touch with him regularly.
