= El Malcriado =

Chicano/a labor newspaper

- The Voice of the Farm Worker
- Type: Biweekly newspaper
- Founder: César Chávez
- Publisher: Farm Worker Press
- Editor: Bill Esher (1964–1967); Doug Adair (1965–1967, 1968–)
- Founded: 1964
- Ceased publication: 1976
- Language: Spanish, English
- Headquarters: Delano, California
- Circulation: 18,000 (peak)

El Malcriado was a Chicano/a bilingual newspaper founded by César Chávez in 1964 to serve as the voice of the United Farm Workers (UFW). Operating until 1976, it became a vital tool for advocating labor rights and organizing farmworkers while also serving as a platform for political commentary, satire, and cultural solidarity within the Chicano/a community. Published in both Spanish and English, El Malcriado played a significant role in the Chicano/a Movement, influencing both labor activism and civil rights struggles, and reflecting the intersection of farmworker rights with broader political movements such as the anti-Vietnam War campaign.

== Circulation ==
El Malcriado was a primarily biweekly newspaper. Initially, copies were available for ten cents only at local grocery stores in Mexican-American neighborhoods in the California Central Valley. Over time, the newspaper earned a list of paying monthly subscribers and expanded its audience to cities ranging from the Bay Area to Los Angeles In September 1965, El Malcriado published 3,000 copies in Spanish and 1,000 copies in English. The popularity of the grape strike and the publication of both Spanish and English editions caused the paper's audience to increase dramatically. After 1965, El Malcriado began to publish more copies in English than in Spanish (as much as 8,000 English copies and 3,000 Spanish copies) and continued to target an audience of English-speaking Mexican-American farmworkers raised in the United States. The newspaper's readership peaked at 18,000 subscribers.

== History ==
=== Origin ===
As early as 1962, César Chávez and the National Farm Workers Association (NFWA) discussed creating a newspaper. Chávez believed a publication was essential to politically organize uneducated farmworkers and provide a unifying voice for the movement. To protect the NFWA from legal challenges, El Malcriado was published by a separate entity under the name "Farm Worker Press". The title El Malcriado translates roughly to "the ill-bred one," "the brat," or "troublemaker" and was inspired by a newspaper from the Mexican Revolution, symbolizing the rebellious spirit of the farmworker movement.

=== 1964–1965: Early period ===
In 1964, Chavez hired Andy Zermeño as the first staff member of El Malcriado, putting him in charge of graphics and illustrations, and later hired Bill Esher as the first editor. Although the newspaper officially became a separate entity from the NFWA after Esher arrived as editor, El Malcriado still remained politically in line with the union's goals. While Esher served as editor, Chavez remained heavily involved in translating and writing articles. Beginning with the fourth issue, the phrase "The Voice of the Farm Worker" was added to the newspaper nameplate. The first eighteen issues were written in Spanish; beginning after issue eighteen, El Malcriado was published in both Spanish and English editions. Chavez eventually hired Doug Adair, a young political activist, in 1965 to be in charge of the paper's English edition.

During first six months of the newspaper's existence, El Malcriado mostly focused on encouraging its readers to become NFWA members. However, as a result of the grape strikes led by the Agricultural Workers Organizing Committee (AWOC), in the summer of 1965 El Malcriado grew more radical and actively promoted striking. In one article, the newspaper provided instructions for new strikers. In another article, the writers promoted striking as the best method for laborers to obtain power.

During the winter of 1964-1965 there were almost no funds in the organization's bank accounts and Wendy Goepal would only give Esher $50 monthly that was out of her own pocket that she would use for personal expenses. To make sure that they had enough money for their newspaper, Chavez and Esher would sometimes have to work in the fields during the winter, and were employed by one of Chavez's cousins. After a while, the newspaper was set up with its own finances set apart from the union, with The Farm Worker Press also being on its own and having a separate publisher.

El Malcriado helped spread news and boost morale for protesting farmworkers during the Delano Grape Strike. The paper printed copies of Jack London's essay, "Definition of a Strikebreaker" in response to scabs. The popularity of the grape strike led to a spike in the newspaper's readership.

In 1965, The FBI targeted El Malcriado after Chavez and the NFWA were accused of communist infiltration. The FBI used an article from El Malcriado as evidence to J. Edgar Hoover that the NFWA and Cesar Chavez were influenced by communism. They subsequently offered $1,000 for anyone that could provide information on communist infiltration of the NFWA or El Malcriado.

=== 1966–1967: Rift between Chavez and newspaper staff ===
Between 1966 and 1967, the paper's main audience expanded from farmworkers to a broader coalition of sympathizers in cities from the Bay Area to Los Angeles.

As the paper grew, Chavez found that El Malcriado began to show an independent streak and often clashed with the paper's staff on certain issues. One point of conflict was over the 1966 California Governor Race, during which El Malcriado refused to endorse incumbent governor Pat Brown. Chavez, the NFWA, and the AFL-CIO agreed to support Pat Brown over his opponent Ronald Reagan. The staff of El Malcriado meanwhile had grievances with Brown for his bringing contracted Mexicans into California and accused him of being a traitor to Mexican-Americans and farmworkers.

Another point of contention was over U.S. intervention in Vietnam. Despite the change in national attitude towards the war, the AFL-CIO, the UFWOC, and many farmworkers were largely pro-war and supported President Lyndon B. Johnson. Chavez was strategically silent on the issue, and to avoid divisiveness, he urged Doug Adair and El Malcriado to remain neutral on the Vietnam War. Going against Chavez's orders, Doug Adair and the staff of El Malcriado openly expressed their opposition to U.S. involvement in Vietnam and criticized the draft. In one issue, El Malcriado published a photo of Mexican-American GIs and a letter by a Mexican-American GI urging fellow Mexican-Americans to oppose the war.

Chavez became increasingly frustrated with the newspaper's staff and their disobedience. Both Bill Esher and Doug Adair noted Chavez's growing irritability and eventually left the paper. The last issue of El Malcriado in its first incarnation was published in August 1967; the paper went bankrupt after that.

=== 1968–1976: Revivals and death of El Malcriado ===
In 1968, El Malcriado was purchased by the United Farm Workers Organizing Committee, the new union, which combined the NFWA and AWOC, and consequently controlled much of the newspaper's content. Doug Adair returned as the paper's editor. As Chavez's national profile grew, the tone of the paper grew increasingly subdued. Union lawyers "would read it word for word and make sure that there was nothing inappropriate or nothing out of line," Adair recalled later.

After numerous revivals and cessations, Chavez began to gradually phase the newspaper out after 1971, as he believed it no longer served the movement's interests.

== Content and themes ==
=== El Malcriado's Role in the Chicano/a Movement ===
El Malcriado was more than just a publication for Cesar Chavez's UFW, it was also a platform for key figures like Dolores Huerta, co-founder of the UFW. Huerta's leadership, especially in the 1965 Delano Grape Strike, was prominently featured in the paper, highlighting her critical role in organizing and advocating for farmworkers' rights. The paper also connected the labor movement to broader Chicano/a struggles, reflecting solidarity with figures like Reies López Tijerina and Rodolfo "Corky" González, who pushed for land rights and cultural recognition. It aligned with the larger Civil Rights Movement, as well as the anti-Vietnam War movement, drawing parallels between the oppression of farmworkers and global struggles for justice. By amplifying voices like Huerta's and linking the farmworker struggle to wider civil rights causes, El Malcriado solidified its role in both labor and political movements of the Chicano/a era.

=== Journalism ===
The paper was instrumental in exposing corruption and advocating for workers' rights. For example, it reported on the practices of a corrupt labor contractor, Jimmy Hronis, who was forced to pay back wages to underpaid workers after El Malcriado exposed him. The paper also frequently criticized employers for exploiting farmworkers and published stories highlighting the need for farmworker rights.

=== Zermeño cartoons ===
El Malcriado used cartoons and graphics to visually communicate ideas to its audience, since not all farmworkers were literate. To do this, Chavez hired a Mexican-American graphic artist named Andy Zermeño as the newspaper's cartoonist. Zermeño and Chavez were responsible for the newspaper's iconic cartoon characters: Don Sotaco, Don Coyote, and El Patron or Patroncito. The magazine frequently depicted Don Sotaco, a misfortunate Mexican-American farmworker, who was repeatedly exploited by his antagonistic boss, Patroncito. Don Sotaco represented the common Mexican-American farmworker without class consciousness. The character of Don Coyote represented the obsequious labor contractor and henchman of the grower. El Patron or Patroncito represented the grower and the owner of the fields and the boss of the farmworkers. In contrast to the union's strategy of portraying its workers as embodiments of physical self-restraint, abstinent and sexually normative, the cartoons also frequently depicted growers as "sexually corrupt and undisciplined," or in drag or homosexual relationships. The Don Sotaco cartoons informed the newspaper's audience on issues affecting Mexican-American laborers and helped raise a sense of class consciousness. Chavez and Zermeño hoped the newspaper's readership would identify with the character of Don Sotaco, and this would help educate farmworkers about their rights. The comics employed humor, satire, and irony to expose the exploitation of migrant farmworkers.

=== Connections to other political movements ===
El Malcriado often displayed solidarity with other social justice causes and connected the farmworkers' movement to the larger Civil Rights Movement. In one article, the newspaper compared a rent strike occurring in Tulare County to the efforts made by Civil Rights activists in Alabama and Mississippi. In another article they compared the Delano grape strike to the Montgomery Bus Boycott. After the assassination of Martin Luther King Jr., El Malcriado dedicated the entire April 15, 1968 edition to his legacy, highlighting his efforts in fighting for workers rights. The issue's title asserted that King was killed for organizing workers and connected his legacy to the efforts of Mexican farmworkers.

El Malcriado also connected the struggles of migrant Mexican workers to the legacy of Mexican Revolution. For example, Chavez borrowed the newspaper's title from another newspaper that ran during the Mexican Revolution. Covers of El Malcriado often featured engravings of Mexican peasant life and rural Mexico. At other times the magazine used images of Mexican Revolution era figures such as Emiliano Zapata and Pancho Villa.

El Malcriado opposed the war in Vietnam. The newspaper demonstrated sympathy with the anti-war movement when it published an image of Mexican-American GIs along with a letter from a Mexican-American GI urging fellow Mexican-Americans to oppose U.S. involvement in Vietnam.

=== The Newspaper ===
"El Malcriado" was published every two weeks in both Spanish and English and was sold for only 10 cents. The issues covered in the newspaper were topics that were happening to them in real time and people around the world. Some issues that were covered were: "The Strike Reaches the Governor...", "We are not water Thieves", "Why are the County Hospitals so Bad?", and "The Boycott covers the Nation". Along with these issues being addressed, there were photographs, cartoons, direct quotes from interviews, and even letters sent to Chavez and editors supporting them on everything they are doing.

== Legacy ==
An online archive of El Malcriado is available via the Farmworker Documentation Project at University of California, San Diego.

In March 2026, The New York Times published an investigation alleging that Chávez had sexually abused multiple women over decades, including minors; UFW co-founder Dolores Huerta, whose organizing work had been prominently featured in El Malcriado, was among those who came forward. The revelations prompted scholars and activists to call for greater recognition of the many other individuals who contributed to the farmworker movement, several of whom, including Huerta, had used El Malcriado as a platform.
