= Andrew Zermeño =

Mexican-American cartoonist (born 1935)

Andrew Zermeño (born 1935) is an American cartoonist from Salinas, California. During the 1960s and 1970s, he was the art director and cartoonist for the Chicano/a labor newspaper El Malcriado.

== Life ==
Zermeño was born in 1935 to a working-class Mexican-American family in Salinas, California. While attending college at the Art Center School of Design in Los Angeles, his brother introduced him to Cesar Chavez, who asked Zermeño to design the eagle logo for the United Farm Workers labor union. When Chavez established El Malcriado in 1964, he brought Zermeño on as the cartoonist.

Zermeño's drawings were critical in communicating criticisms of labor conditions and other political commentary to illiterate farmworkers. Chavez described his drawings as "a work of genius." The cartoons featured the iconic characters of Don Sotaco, the farm worker; Don Coyote, the contractor; and El Patroncito, the grower. Don Sotaco represented the Mexican-American worker without class consciousness. Zermeño recalled that "We wanted [farmworkers] to identify with this character and show that if you didn't know your rights, you would get into a lot of trouble." Zermeño also created strike posters and calendars for the union. In 1971, he returned to Los Angeles to work as a freelance illustrator, and he retired in 1998.
