= Tanaka Farms =

Farm and attraction in California

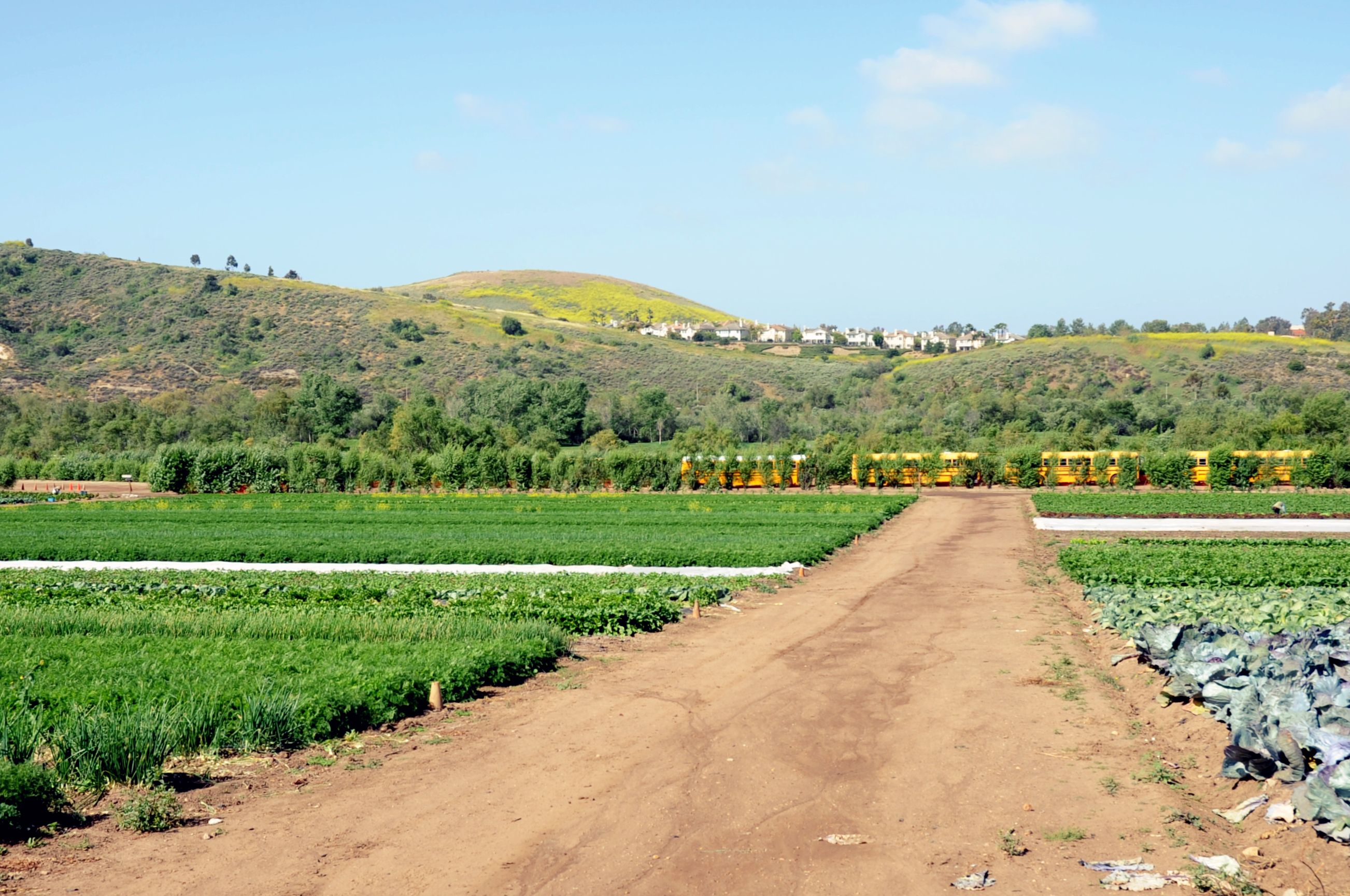
- The farm in 2011

- Location within the Los Angeles metropolitan area Location within California
- Town/City: 5380 3/4 University Dr, Irvine, CA 92612
- Coordinates: 33.6565°N 117.8001°W
- Established: 1940; 86 years ago 1998; 28 years ago (current location)
- Area: 30 acres (12 ha)
- Website: www.tanakafarms.com

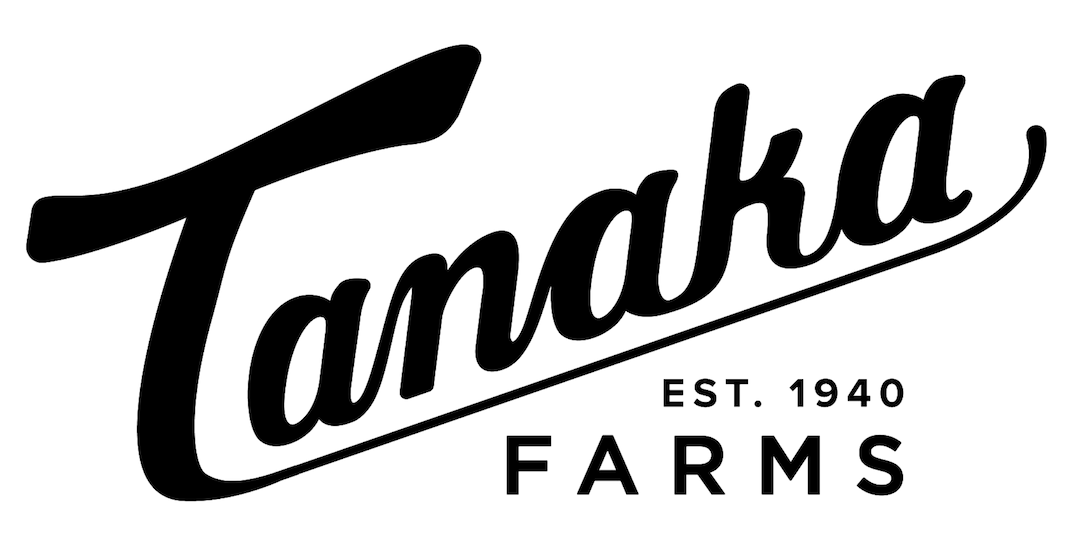
Logo

Tanaka Farms is a family-owned and operated farm and produce market in Irvine, California. Its focus is not wholesale goods production but agritourism, mainly focused towards school-age children on field trips. It grows over sixty varieties of fruits and vegetables and does not use GMO seeds or unapproved pesticides. The organization also operates a sunflower field in Costa Mesa. Agritourism makes up about a third of the farm's income, with their produce stand and CSA program making up the rest.

== History ==
Tanaka Farms was founded by Takeo Tanaka, a first-generation immigrant from Hiroshima Prefecture in the early 20th century. Tanaka and his wife worked as farmhands on a small farm in Northern California. His son George was born in 1922 in Dinuba, California. George fled to Utah during World War II to avoid being sent to an internment camp, meeting his future wife, Chris Yamashita. She was from a farming family from Fukuoka Prefecture. The couple returned to California in 1945, now living in Fountain Valley, where they farmed various fruits and vegetables. Glenn Tanaka was born in 1957. Finishing high school early, he majored in Agricultural Business at California State Polytechnic University, Pomona and also finished college early as well. There, he encountered his eventual wife, Shirley Namekata, who was majoring in Nutrition. Shirley had grown up in Riverside, also to a farming family.

After graduating, Glenn expanded the farm to nearly 300 acres (120 ha) and started distributing goods, mainly tomatoes and strawberries, nationwide. Kenny was born in 1983, and after a tour of his parents' farm by his preschool class, the Tanakas realized that they could have a future in agritourism. The city started acquiring some of the Tanaka family's land, reducing it to 100 acres (40 ha). In 1996, Strawberry Farms Golf Club bought 70 acres (28 ha), and the other 30 acres (12 ha) was leased to the City of Irvine, meaning that Tanaka Farms does not own the land they farm on. Land development caused the Tanakas to move their farm entirely, relocating it from Irvine Center Dr. to Strawberry Farms Rd in 1998. After this move, the family started converting their farm's focus from goods production to agritourism, holding their first strawberry-picking tour.

Kenny married Christine, a school teacher, and they had three children: Landon, Kaylee, and Kenji. The popularity of Tanaka Farms grew considerably in 2003. Glenn received the Agricultural Achievement Medal from the Agricultural Society of Japan for his activities on the farm in 2017. It created a drive-through produce stand during the COVID-19 pandemic. In 2023, the farm received the Frances K. Hashimoto Community Service Award from Rafu Shimpo.

== Activities ==
During the Hikari Festival in winter, the farm is decorated with over a million lights. Visitors can ride a wagon around the area to reach a field with many lanterns. There is live music on the weekends and other activities.

The Barnyard Educational Exhibit is a petting zoo using safe methods to ensure the animals' safety. It contains chickens, donkeys, goats, sheep, turkeys, a pig, a pony, and a miniature cow. There is also a storytime twice a week.

Chicks 'N' Sprouts is a workshop teaching children how chickens grow inside their eggs and the stages of plant development. They also plant their own common sunflower and harvest a vegetable. The Tanaka Farms Chicken Club educates children about raising chickens and how to train them. There is also a yoga class with goats.

Group wagon tours are available in which participants are given a tour around the farms, learning about the location's history and responsible farming methods. They are given the chance to pick produce along the way.

Tanaka Farms also operates a seasonal pumpkin patch where visitors can pick pumpkins. The area also contains a pumpkin cannon and a corn maze. This is the most popular attraction in Tanaka Farms, receiving 60,000-80,000 visitors during the festival's run in October.

Tanaka Grill is a food vendor with a seasonal menu. The farm also hosts dinners; most of the food comes straight from the farm. Some dinners are held as fundraisers. At the end of the year, it also hosts a Kagami mochi-making contest.

== Collaborations ==
Tanaka Farms has collaborated with various groups. Through 2020, child entertainer Blippi made various videos of himself visiting the farm. It was in a partnership with Japanese entertainment company Sanrio from 2017 to 2018, in which characters were incorporated into the educational teachings by Tanaka, and photo-ops featuring Sanrio characters were featured throughout the farm. Additionally, a limited-edition collection of Sanrio and Tanaka Farms merchandise was released.

== Sustainability ==
Tanaka Farms educates the general public about "responsible farming methods", such as crop rotation, companion planting, and composting. The farm uses Organic Materials Review Institute-approved pesticides. They also handle water efficiently by using reclaimed water, plasticulture, and underground drip irrigation. The farm partakes in community-supported agriculture. To prevent a shortage of seasonal workers, the farm employs 22 people full-time for the entire year and expands it to over 100 during its busy season in the fall.

== Philanthropy ==
Tanaka Farms created the Helping Farms Feed Families initiative, a 501(c)(3) organization. It aims to work with other farms to deliver their extra produce to local food banks. However, it was dissolved in favor of another fundraiser started by the farm: Walk the Farm. It began after the 2011 Tōhoku earthquake and tsunami, where participants can donate to help farmers suffering from natural disasters and pick produce from the farm. It raised over $1 million.
