= List of monuments and memorials to Cesar Chavez =

Chavez memorials

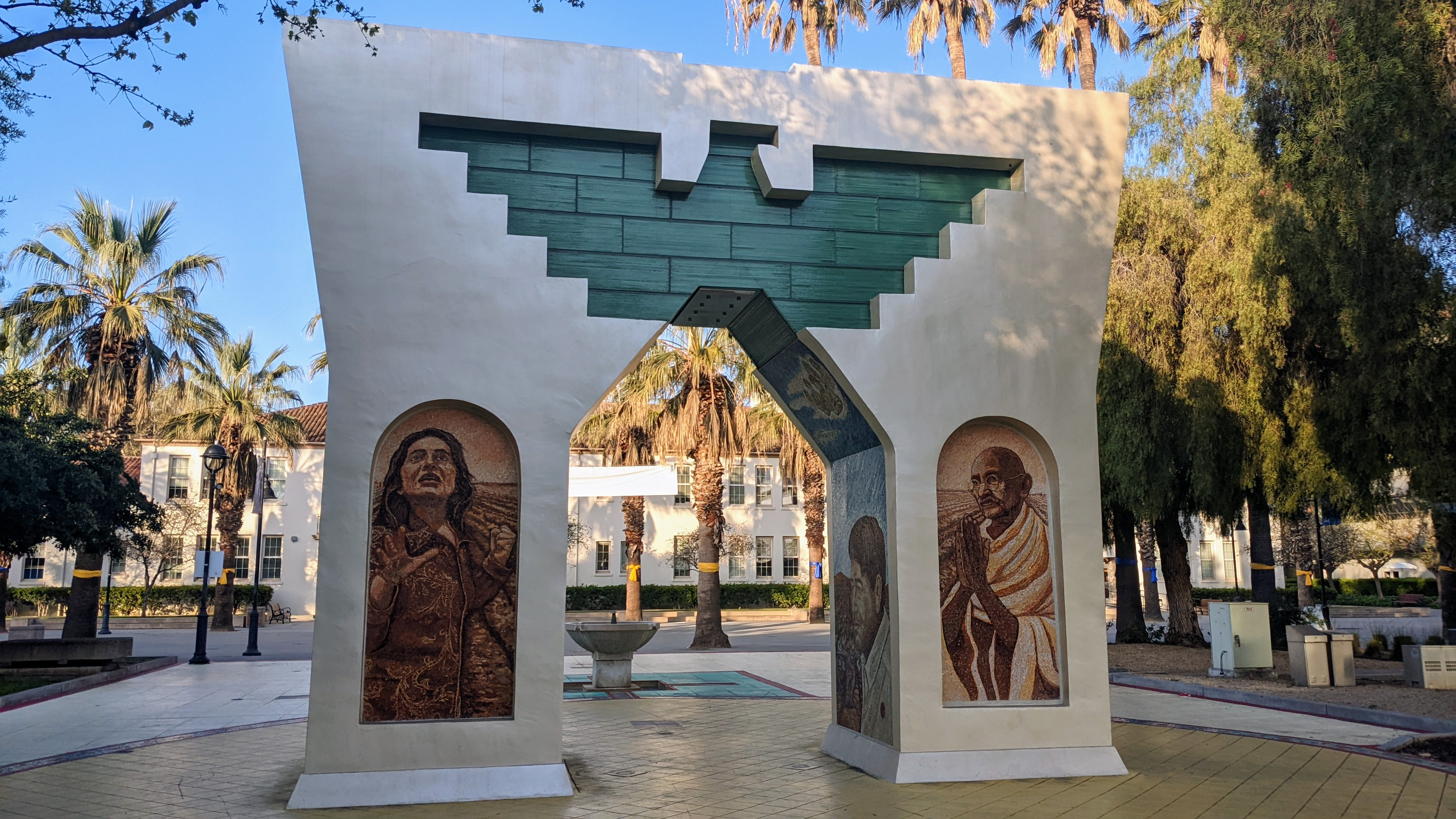
Arch of Dignity, Equality, and Justice, 2008 by Judy Baca, San Jose State University campus, San Jose, California

This is a list of monuments and memorials to Cesar Chavez, an American labor leader and civil rights activist. This list includes objects, including artworks (statues, murals, etc.) named for or depicting Chavez, along with commemorative awards and events in his honor. For a list of geographic locations named to commemorate Chavez, including buildings, streets, and institutions, see List of places named after Cesar Chavez.

Beginning in March 2026, following public allegations that Chavez had sexually abused women and minors, various local and state governments and other organizations either removed or made plans to remove or derecognize various monuments and events honoring him.

== Monuments ==
Image	Name if known	Location	Type	Date installed/established	Notes	References
	César E. Chávez National Monument	Keene, California	Gravesite of Cesar Chavez.	October 8, 2012 (established as national monument)		

== Artworks ==
Name if known	Location	Type	Date installed/established	Notes	References
Arch of Dignity, Equality, and Justice	San Jose State University, San Jose, California	Mosaic arch	2008	Pearlescent plaster arch with Venetian tile mosaics by Judy Baca, featuring portraits of Chavez, Dolores Huerta, Mahatma Gandhi, Robert Kennedy, and two unnamed farmworkers. Under review by SJSU as of March 2026.	
César Chávez	University of Texas at Austin, Austin, Texas	Sculpture	October 2007	Bronze sculpture by Pablo Eduardo. Future under discussion as of March 2026.	
	Santa Ana, California	Murals	various	Chavez's face is featured on several murals throughout the city.	

== Former monuments and memorials ==
=== Artworks ===
Name if known	Location	Type	Date installed	Date removed	Notes	References
	Berkeley, Denver, Colorado	Memorial bust	2015	March 19, 2026	Bronze and marble bust sculpted by Emanuel Martinez and installed in César Chávez Park.	
Cesar E. Chavez Memorial	Cesar E. Chavez Memorial Park, San Fernando, California	Bronze statue and mural	2004	March 19, 2026	Bronze statue removed by city council vote following an emergency meeting. A 100-foot mural by artist Ignacio Gomez at the same site was covered; the city plans to ask the artist to modify it.	
	Santa Ana College	Mural		March 19, 2026	Covered pending a final decision by the Santiago Community College District Board of Trustees.	
Tiene La Lumbre Por Dentro (He Has The Fire Inside)	Sonoma State University	Mural and portrait	2000	March 19, 2026	8 ft x 24 ft wood relief work by Johanna Poethig in the campus library; mural covered up. A portrait of Chavez in Stevenson Hall was also removed.	
	916 S. Chavez Drive, Milwaukee, Wisconsin	Statue	2016	March 20, 2026	Privately owned bronze statue and plaque	
	Watts, Los Angeles, California	Mural	2021	March 20, 2026	Mural located at Watts Century Latino Organization. Original image of Chavez replaced with that of Dolores Huerta.	
Libertad	Pilsen Historic District, Chicago	Mural	2008	March 20, 2026	Incorporates images of American and international activists. Original image of Chavez removed.	
Cesar E. Chavez Memorial Monument	California State University, Fresno	Monumental sculpture	March 1996	March 20, 2026	Bronze life-size statue of Chavez atop a black granite plinth, in university's Peace Garden. Designed by Paul A. Suarez.	
	California State University, San Marcos	Sculpture	1993	March 20, 2026	Shrouded in March 2026 following the news of the Cesar Chavez sexual abuse allegations.	
	Mission District, San Francisco	Mural		March 20, 2026	A mural painted on the Latin Rock Music House at 25th and York Streets was painted over by the building's owner.	
	San Francisco State University	Mural	c. 1994	March 2026	Mural on the façade of the César Chávez Student Center, painted by Carlos "Kookie" Gonzalez. Planned to be covered during Spring break 2026, with a permanent replacement to follow.	
	San Joaquin Delta College, Stockton, California	Relief mural		March 2026	Metal relief mural featuring Chavez on the eastern exterior wall of Goleman Library. Covered following a recommendation from the college's Gallery Committee.	
	Chicano Park, Barrio Logan, San Diego	Mural(s)	1973–present	March 22, 2026	Chavez depicted in murals painted on bridge pylons beneath the San Diego–Coronado Bridge. The park is a National Historic Landmark and home to the largest collection of outdoor murals in the United States. At least one Chavez mural was spray-painted over; the park's steering committee is reviewing remaining depictions.	
	Tucson, Arizona	Monumental sculpture	2020	March 23, 2026	1,000 pounds (453.59 kg), 6.0 feet (1.83 m)-tall bronze statue by Luis Gustavo Mena.	

== See also ==
- List of monuments and memorials removed during the George Floyd protests
