= César E. Chávez National Monument =

U.S. National Monument in Keene, Kern County, California

César E. Chávez National Monument (Nuestra Señora Reina de la Paz)
- IUCN category V (protected landscape/seascape)
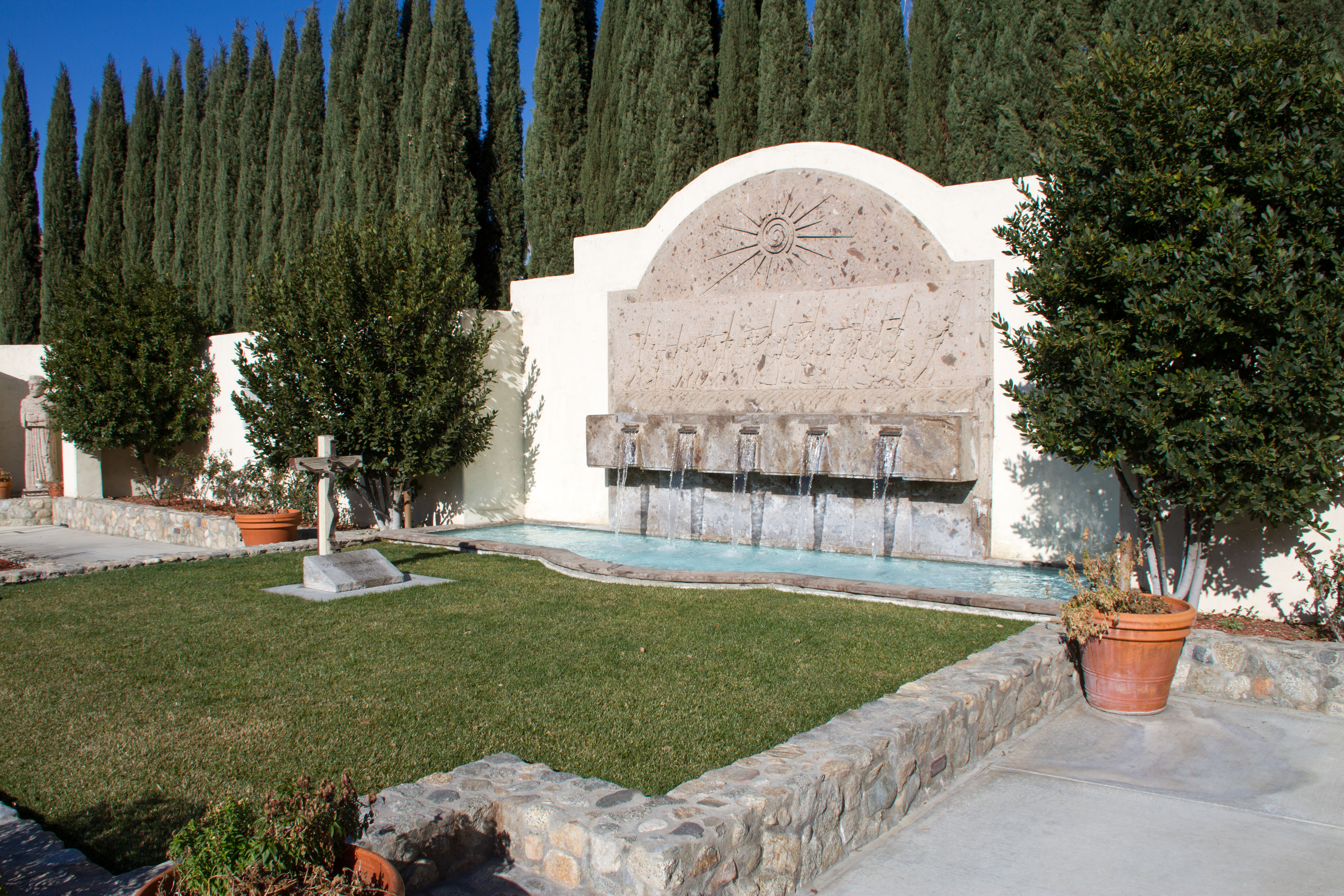
- César E. Chávez burial site

- Location within California Location within the United States
- Interactive map of César E. Chávez National Monument (Nuestra Señora Reina de la Paz)
- Location: Kern County, California, United States
- Nearest city: Bakersfield
- Coordinates: 35°13′38″N 118°33′41″W
- Area: 116 acres (47 ha)
- Authorized: October 8, 2012
- Visitors: 31,497 (in 2025)
- Governing body: National Park Service
- Website: Cesar E. Chavez National Monument
- Nuestra Senora Reina de la Paz
- U.S. National Register of Historic Places
- U.S. National Historic Landmark
- Location within California
- Location: 29700 Woodford-Tehachapi Rd., Keene, California
- Area: 187 acres (76 ha)
- Built by: Chavez, Richard; et al.
- Architectural style: Bungalow/craftsman, Mission/spanish Revival
- NRHP reference No.: 11000576
- Added to NRHP: August 30, 2011

César E. Chávez National Monument, also known as Nuestra Señora Reina de la Paz, is a 116-acre (47 ha) U.S. national monument in Keene, California, located about 32 miles away from Bakersfield, California. The property was the headquarters of the United Farm Workers (UFW), and home to César Chávez from the early 1970s until his death in 1993.

Chávez's gravesite is located in the property's gardens along with that of his wife, Helen Fabela Chávez. Originally developed as a headquarters and worker housing area for a quarry, it served as a tuberculosis sanitarium (known as Stony Brook Sanitorium) in the early 1900s, until its acquisition by the UFW in the early 1970s.

== History ==
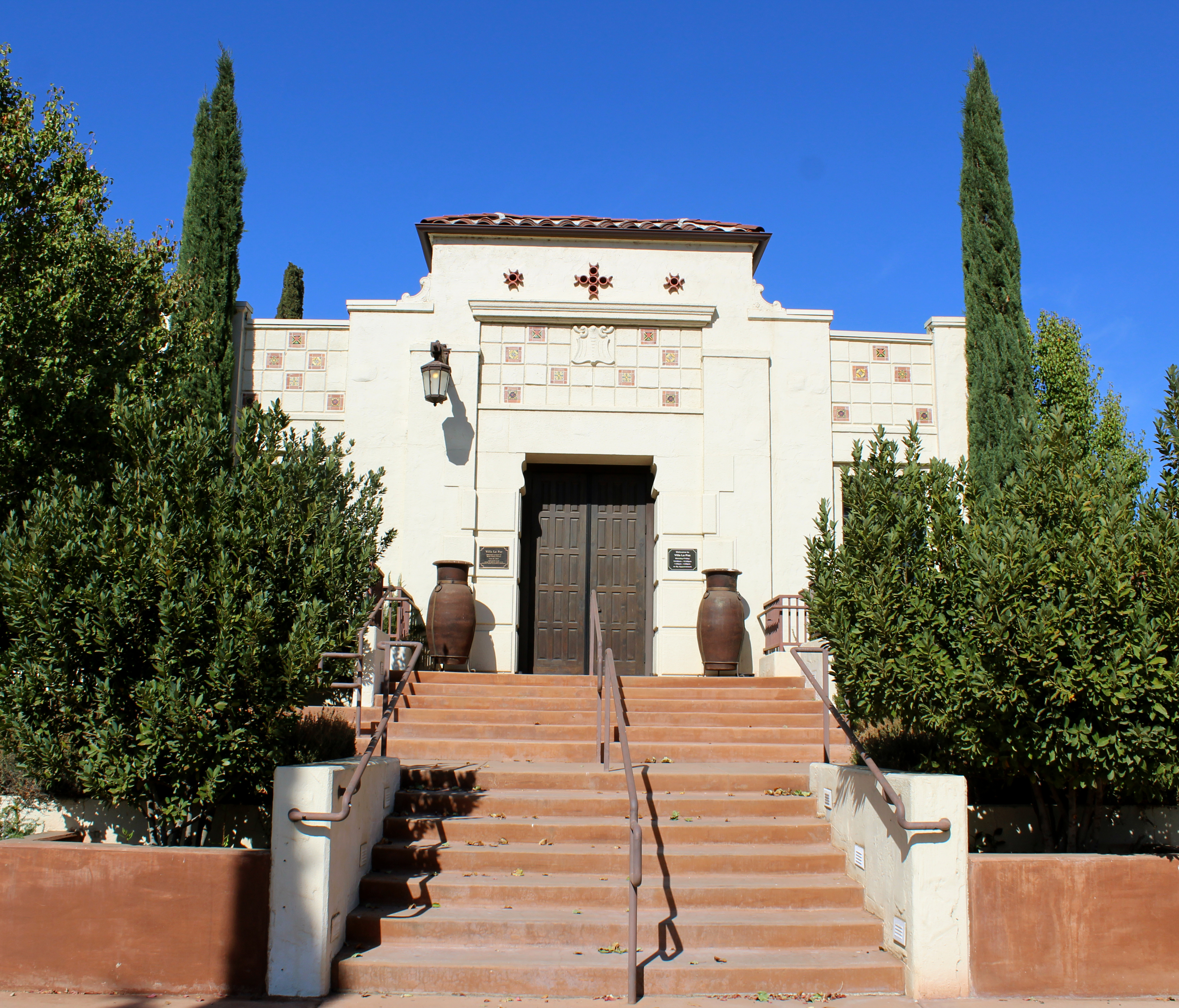
The main entrance to Villa La Paz.

Cesar E. Chavez National Monument was established by President Barack Obama on October 8, 2012, by proclamation under authority of the Antiquities Act. The monument is located among the Tehachapi Mountains in Keene, California, about 32 miles (51 km) southeast of Bakersfield. The property is known as Nuestra Señora Reina de la Paz (La Paz), which was designated as a National Historic Landmark along with the monument on October 8, 2012.

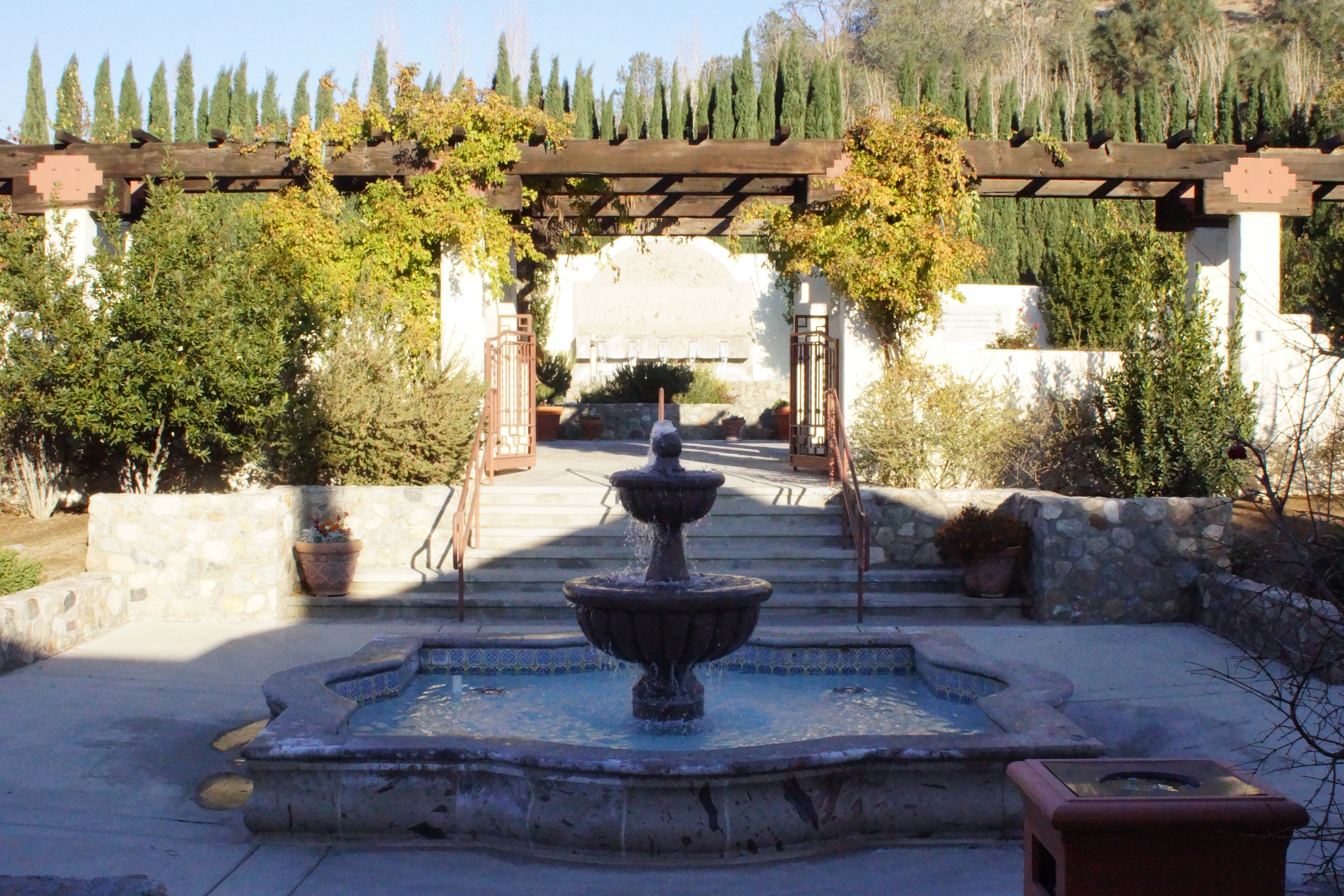
Fountain and gardens at César E. Chávez National Monument.

The monument is the 398th unit in the National Park System and is managed collaboratively by the National Park Service and the National Chavez Center. The center and members of the Chávez family donated properties of La Paz to the federal government to establish the national monument. Initial funding was provided by the National Park Foundation and the America Latino Heritage Fund.

Some of the monument's services and programs are still in development, but a visitor center and memorial garden where Chavez is buried are open to the public. Certain areas of the monument are closed to the public due to the Chávez family still living in La Paz, and members of the UFW still working in the UFW offices located on the property.

The National Cesar Chavez Center pressured California lawmakers to scale back plans to increase freight capacity on train tracks near the monument. The Center also protested against proposed high-speed rail near the monument, leading policymakers to add a detour for the high-speed rail line, which added $815 million to the California high-speed rail project.

== Proposed inclusion in national historical park ==
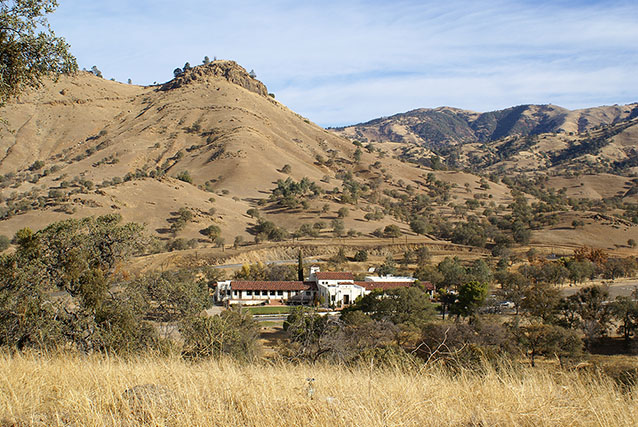
Chávez National Monument, showing its location within Tehachapi Pass.

In October 2013, the National Park Service identified the site as one of several to be part of a proposed new National Historical Park to commemorate the life and work of Cesar Chávez and the farm worker movement. Other sites for the proposed new park include the Filipino Community Hall in Delano, California (headquarters of the Delano grape strike), The Forty Acres (the original UFW headquarters in Delano), McDonnell Hall in San Jose, and the Santa Rita Center in Phoenix, Arizona.

Legislation for redesignation of the site was reintroduced in 2023. In March 2026, following sexual abuse allegations against Chávez, Representative Raul Ruiz and Senator Alex Padilla, both California Democrats and the lead sponsors of the legislation, announced they would no longer advance the bills and would instead work to rename the associated landmarks.

== Response to 2026 sexual abuse allegations ==
In March 2026, The New York Times published an investigation alleging that Chávez had sexually abused women and girls over the course of decades, including UFW co-founder Dolores Huerta. Multiple accusers said that some of the reported abuse took place at La Paz itself, including in Chávez's office on the property. The future of the national monument remained uncertain; altering or renaming a national monument requires an act of Congress or action by the president. The National Parks Conservation Association stated that it continued to support a national park site honoring the farmworker movement, emphasizing that the movement's history "is not about a single person."

== See also ==
- California Historical Landmarks in Kern County, California
- List of National Historic Landmarks in California
- National Register of Historic Places listings in Kern County, California
- List of monuments and memorials to Cesar Chavez
- List of national monuments of the United States
