= Statue of Cesar Chavez =

Sculpture in Austin, Texas, U.S.

Cesar Chavez
- Artist: Pablo Eduardo
- Year: 2007
- Medium: Bronze
- Subject: Cesar Chavez
- Dimensions: 460 cm (15 ft)
- Location: Austin, Texas, United States; 30°17′8.4″N 97°44′25.2″W
- Owner: University of Texas at Austin

Cesar Chavez is an outdoor bronze sculpture depicting the American labor leader and civil rights activist of the same name, by Bolivian-born sculptor Pablo Eduardo. Installed on the University of Texas at Austin campus in Austin, Texas, it was the first statue of a Hispanic individual on the campus. The sculpture was unveiled on October 9, 2007, on the West Mall between Battle Hall and the West Mall Office Building until its removal on June 4, 2026.

== Description ==
The 15-foot-tall bronze statue depicts Chavez facing west, carrying a flag draped over his left shoulder with the flagpole resting across his shoulders as the banner unfurls behind him. The pose is intended to suggest hard-won victory. The figure stands on a plinth consisting of two bronze plates decorated with meandering grape vines and a head of Dionysus, the Greek god of wine, depicted as defeated—symbolizing the farmworkers' victory over the California grape industry. Beneath the plates, bronze blocks are arranged to represent civil rights as the building blocks of democracy.

The sculptor, Pablo Eduardo, is a Bolivian-born artist based in Gloucester, Massachusetts, known for figurative public works including the Mayor Kevin White monument at Faneuil Hall in Boston and the Boston Marathon bombing memorial markers on Boylston Street.

== History ==
=== Background and funding ===
The project originated with the We Are Texas Too student organization, which advocated for greater representation of minority figures in campus iconography. The organization established the Cesar Chavez Statue Committee to oversee the effort. A campus-wide student referendum was held during the spring 2003 semester, and the project was subsequently approved by the University of Texas System Board of Regents that summer.

Funding was authorized through House Bill 1537, passed during the 78th legislative session in 2003, which permitted the university to impose a dedicated student fee to fund statues of both Cesar Chavez and Barbara Jordan on campus. Governor Rick Perry signed the bill into law on June 20, 2003. Collection of a $2-per-semester student fee began in the spring 2004 semester and concluded in the summer of 2007, ultimately raising approximately $450,000. Leftover funds were directed toward a scholarship fund.

=== Dedication ===
The statue was unveiled on October 9, 2007, during a ceremony on the West Mall. Stacy Torres, chair of the Cesar Chavez Statue Committee and a senior majoring in government, helped coordinate the event. The dedication marked the culmination of a student-led initiative that had been in development since 2000. At the time of its installation, the only other statues of non-white historical figures on the campus were of Martin Luther King Jr. on the East Mall and a then-forthcoming statue of Barbara Jordan. The Austin Chronicle named the statue "Best New Shade of Bronze" in its 2007 Best of Austin critics' picks, noting that the campus was beginning to diversify its public art beyond its previous Confederate monuments.

=== Campus monument debates ===
The statue has been referenced in broader discussions about public monuments at UT Austin. In August 2015, the university removed a statue of Confederate president Jefferson Davis from the Main Mall following a mass shooting at a Black church in Charleston, South Carolina. In August 2017, university president Gregory L. Fenves ordered the overnight removal of three additional Confederate statues—depicting Robert E. Lee, Albert Sidney Johnston, and John H. Reagan—from the Main Mall, following the Unite the Right rally in Charlottesville, Virginia. Those statues were relocated to the Dolph Briscoe Center for American History for scholarly study.

=== 2026 sexual abuse allegations and response ===
In March 2026, The New York Times published an investigation alleging that Chavez had sexually abused women and girls over the course of decades, including minors connected to the farmworker movement. The fallout in Austin was swift: the annual Cesar Chavez parade and celebration was canceled, and city leaders began the process of renaming Cesar Chavez Street. Governor Greg Abbott directed state agencies to stop observing Cesar Chavez Day and announced plans to work with legislators to remove the March 31 holiday from state law. An East Austin mural of Chavez was also painted over by the building's owners.

The university did not immediately announce a decision on the statue's future. Austin City Council member Zohaib Qadri, whose district includes the campus, expressed support for removing or replacing the statue. Local activist Susana Almanza of PODER stated that it was "too early to tell" whether removal would occur, and Bertha Rendon Ortiz, founder of Arte Texas, cautioned that the community had not been given sufficient time to process the revelations before changes were made. Karma Chávez, chair of the Department of Mexican American and Latina/o Studies at UT Austin, said that decisions about the statue should include input from the Chicano community and those affected by the allegations.

On June 4, 2026, the university removed the statue from the West Mall.

== See also ==
- 2007 in art
- List of monuments and memorials to Cesar Chavez
