= Cesar Chavez Day =

US commemorative holiday on March 31

Farmworkers Day
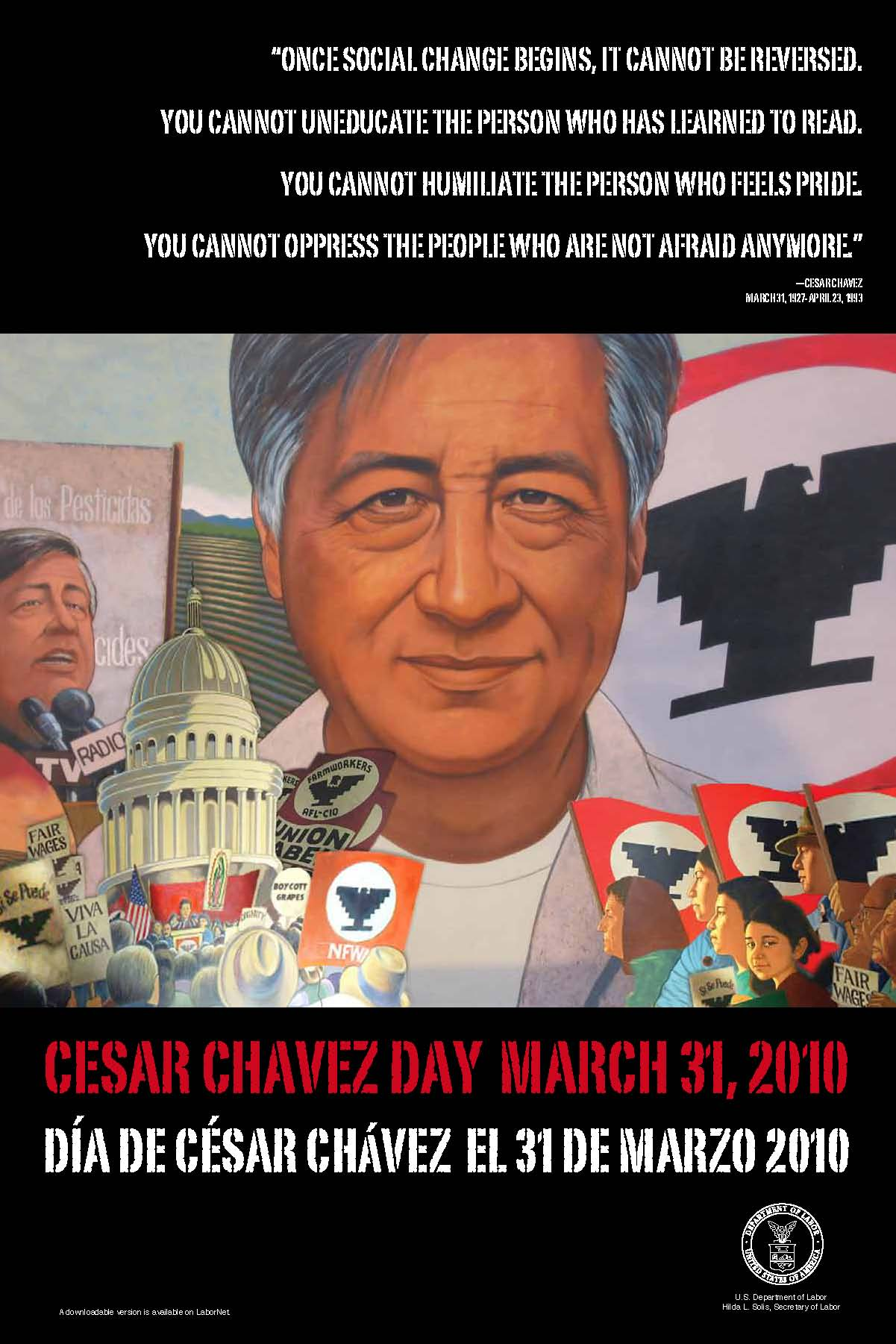
- Poster commemorating Cesar Chavez Day
- Observed by: (1) A formal holiday in US states of Arizona, California, and Utah (2) An optional holiday in US state of Colorado, state offices open with limited staffing (3) A festival day in Nebraska and Nevada (4) A commemorative proclamation holiday by the United States
- Date: March 31
- Next time: March 31, 2027
- Frequency: annual

Farmworkers Day is a U.S. federal commemorative holiday, proclaimed by President Barack Obama in 2014. Originally named Cesar Chavez Day, the holiday celebrates the birth and legacy of the civil rights and labor movement activist Cesar Chavez, a cofounder and president of the United Farm Workers union, on March 31 every year.

In March 2026, following public allegations that Chavez had sexually abused women and minors, the United Farm Workers union halted celebrations of the holiday, joined by other organizations and local and state governments. Several jurisdictions, including California, renamed it Farmworkers Day to celebrate the broader movement.

== Observances by state ==
State	Observance
Arizona	A paid holiday observed by the cities of Phoenix (as Farmworkers Day) and Tucson, all schools in the Tucson Unified School District. Some schools in Phoenix, Arizona are closed on the holiday.
California	March 31, moved to the following Monday when March 31 falls on a Sunday, is designated as the state holiday "Farmworkers Day", formerly "Cesar Chavez Day". Public schools may, but are not required to, close in observance.
Colorado	Declared as an optional holiday on March 31.
Utah	State offices are closed and school is optional.

== Origins ==
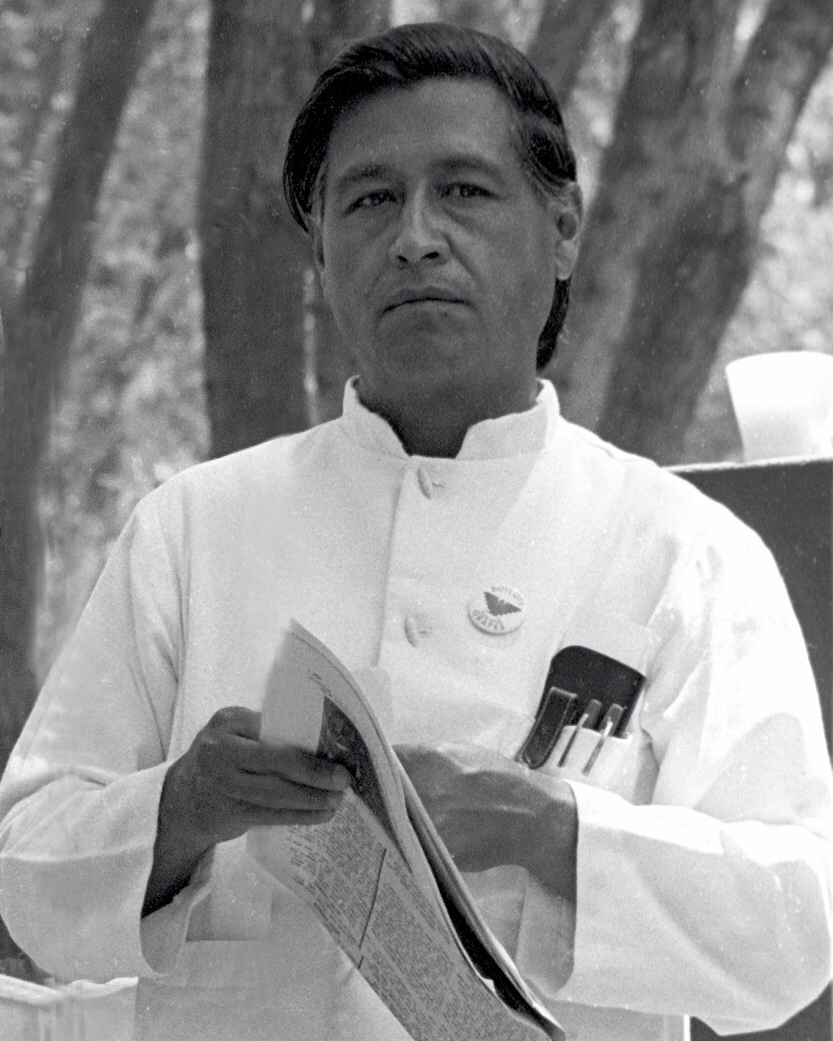
César Chávez in 1974

Cesar Chavez (born Cesar Estrada Chavez, locally [ˈsesaɾ esˈtɾaða ˈtʃaβes]; March 31, 1927 – April 23, 1993) was an American farm worker, labor leader and civil rights activist, who, with Dolores Huerta, co-founded the National Farm Workers Association, later the United Farm Workers union, UFW.

It is commemorated to promote service to the community in honor of Cesar Chavez's life and work. Some state government offices, community colleges, libraries, and public schools are closed. Texas recognizes the day. It is an optional holiday in Arizona (official holiday in the cities of Phoenix and Tucson) and Colorado. Americans are urged to "regard this day with appropriate service, community, and educational programs to honor Cesar Chavez's enduring legacy."

There are celebrations in his honor in Arizona, Michigan, Nebraska, and New Mexico. It was observed in California from 1995 to 2025, and in Colorado since 2001 as state holidays (optional in Colorado).

== History ==
=== Proclamations ===
On March 31, 2008, while a senator, Barack Obama endorsed the idea of creating a national holiday in Chavez's honor: "Chavez left a legacy as an educator, environmentalist, and a civil rights leader. And his cause lives on. As farm workers and laborers across America continue to struggle for fair treatment and fair wages, we find strength in what Cesar Chavez accomplished so many years ago. And we should honor him for what he's taught us about making America a stronger, more just, and more prosperous nation. That's why I support the call to make Cesar Chavez's birthday a national holiday. It's time to recognize the contributions of this American icon to the ongoing efforts to perfect our union." Grassroots organizations continued to urge creation of such a national holiday; and, on March 30, 2011, Obama as president reiterated his support: "Cesar Chavez's legacy provides lessons from which all Americans can learn."

The City of Sacramento passed a resolution recognizing Chavez's birthday as a city holiday on July 27, 1993, shortly after his death.

Cesar Chavez Day has been celebrated in Reno, Nevada, since 2003. A state law passed in 2009 (AB 301) requires Nevada's governor to annually issue a proclamation declaring March 31 as Cesar Chavez Day.

On March 28, 2014, President Obama used his authority to proclaim March 31 as Cesar Chavez Day.

=== National holiday movement ===
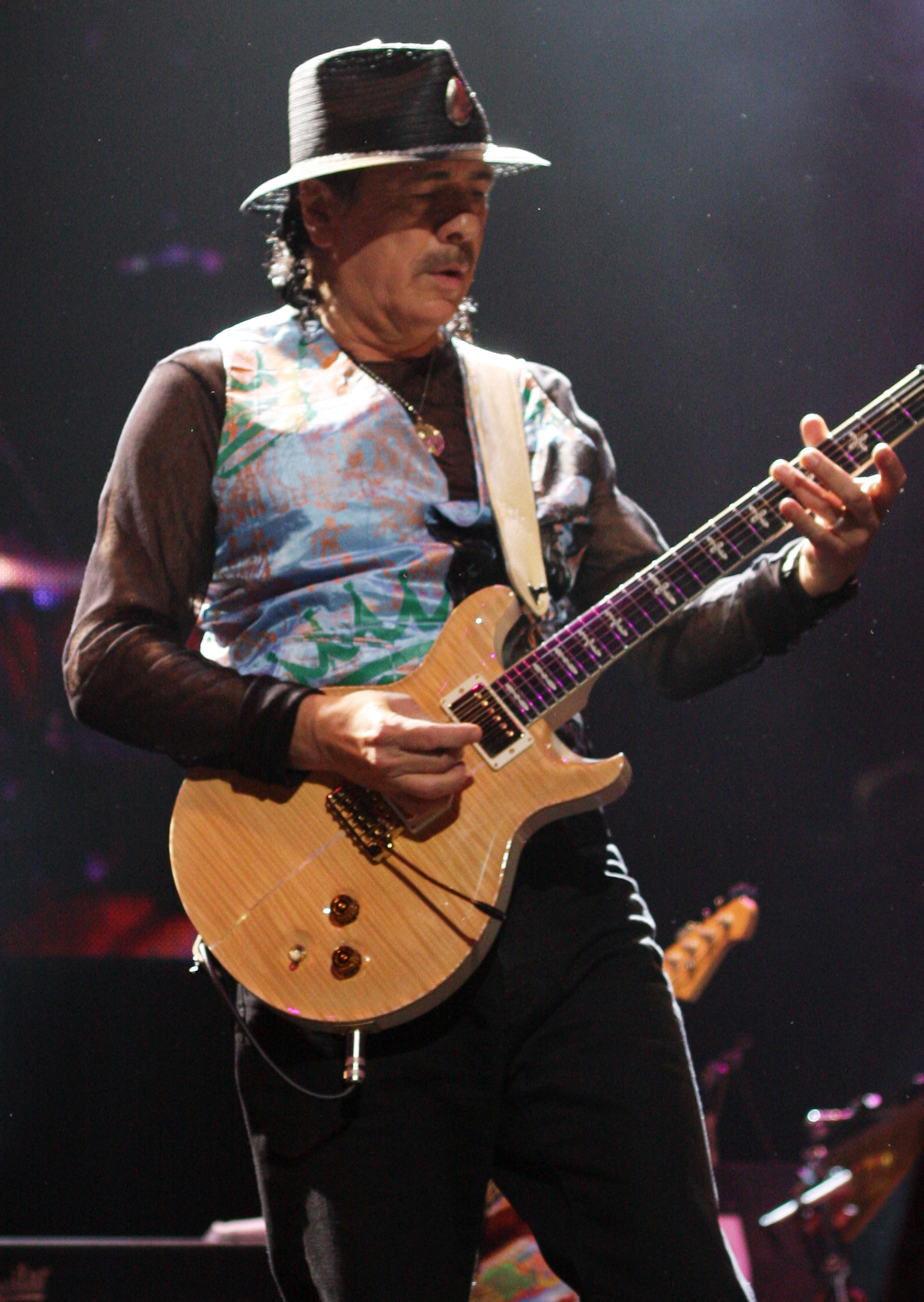
Carlos Santana, leader of national movement to declare Cesar Chavez Day a national holiday

Cesar Chavez Day as a national holiday has gained support from musician Carlos Santana, civil rights and labor leaders. Rallies were held in 2006 in Los Angeles with the goal of raising awareness beyond California. Currently, a major obstacle to this day becoming a national holiday is caused by a rule in Congress that prevents bills with national holiday provisions from being introduced. The holiday proposal would need to overcome that obstacle before legislation can be introduced.

=== Derecognition following Chavez sexual abuse allegations ===
Following public allegations in March 2026 that Chavez had sexually abused women and minors, including fellow activist leader Dolores Huerta, the United Farm Workers union cancelled its Cesar Chavez Day events. The cities of Los Angeles and Phoenix signed proclamations renaming the holiday to "Farmworkers Day". The State of California approved legislation to do the same.

In Texas, which had observed the day as an optional holiday since 2000, Texas Governor Greg Abbott directed state agencies to cease commemoration of Chavez and said he would work to have the holiday officially removed from state law. In Washington state, which had marked the day since 2018, Governor Bob Ferguson said April 10, the birthday of Dolores Huerta, would be celebrated in place of Chavez's.

== Reception ==
The day highlights the legacy of Cesar Chavez and focuses on Chicano or Mexican Americans efforts in the labor movement. Events surrounding the holiday largely ignore the actions of the Agricultural Workers Organizing Committee, and its Filipino American membership and leadership, who began the Delano Grape Strike which propelled Cesar Chavez to international notoriety. Because of this, Filipino Americans have been critical of the day's focus, which excludes acknowledgement of their history.

== See also ==
- Public holidays in the United States
