= Arturo Rodriguez (unionist) =

1949- member of the United Farm Workers

Arturo Rodriguez (born June 23, 1949) is a former American labor union leader.

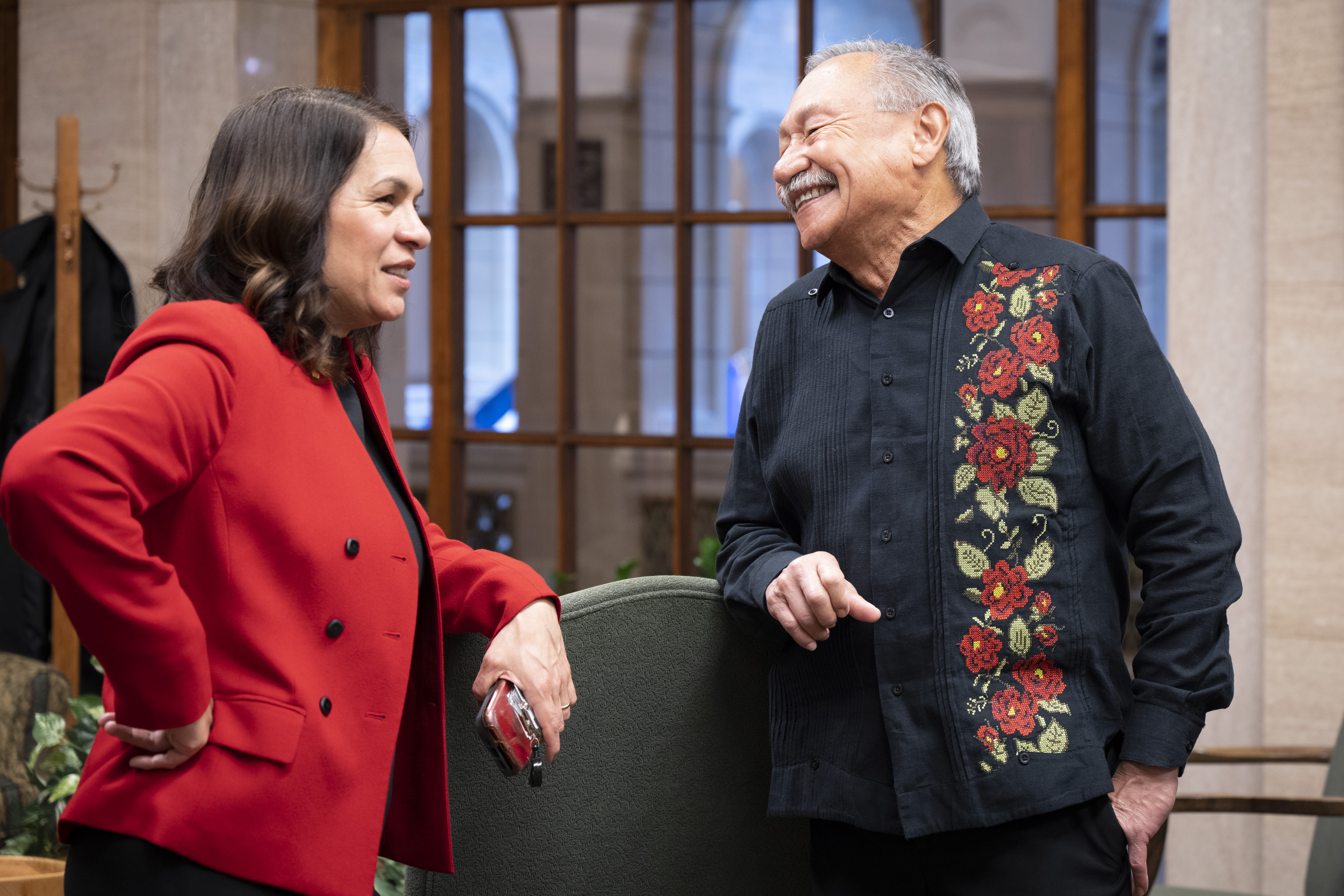
Rodriquez (r) in 2023

Born in San Antonio, Rodriguez was educated at St. Mary's University, Texas and the University of Michigan. While at college, he became involved in the United Farm Workers' grape boycott. After graduating, he worked for the union full-time. He met and married Linda Chavez, daughter of the union's president, Cesar Chavez. In 1981, he was elected to the union's executive board, and in 1992 he became first vice-president.

In 1993, Rodriguez became president of the union. In the post, he led a major organizing and contract negotiating drive, which increased the union's membership. In 1994, he led a 343-mile march to highlight the union's campaigns. As leader, he was paid only a low wage, similar to that of the union's members. In later years, the union spent more time focusing on securing positive legislation, and while attempts to organize strawberry workers failed, it continued to win some other recognition votes.

Rodriguez served as a vice-president of the AFL-CIO, but in 2005 he led the union out of the federation and into the new Change to Win Coalition. He retired in 2018.

Trade union offices
Preceded by Cesar Chavez	President of the United Farm Workers; 1993–2018	Succeeded by Teresa Romero
