= National Farm Workers Association Headquarters =

- U.S. National Register of Historic Places
- Location within California Location within the United States
- Location: 102 Albany St., Delano, California
- Coordinates: 35°45′28″N 119°15′31″W
- Built: 1953
- Built by: Henry Morales
- NRHP reference No.: 15000715
- Added to NRHP: October 13, 2015

The National Farm Workers Association Headquarters in Delano, California, also known as Iglesia Pentecostal La Nueva Jerusalem, was listed on the National Register of Historic Places in 2015.

It is significant for its historic use as a union hall starting on September 26, 1964. It was the starting point of the National Farm Workers Association's protest march starting on March 17, 1966, in Delano and ending on April 10 in California's capital Sacramento.

The building is a one-story wood frame commercial building with stucco exterior, built in 1953 by Henry Morales, with plan dimensions originally about 25 by 50 feet (7.6 m × 15.2 m). A side addition later expanded it to about 37.5 by 50 feet (11.4 m × 15.2 m) in plan.

In 2015 it was in use as a church.

== See also ==
- The Forty Acres, also NRHP-listed in Delano
