= The Forty Acres =

Site in Delano, California

- U.S. National Register of Historic Places
- U.S. National Historic Landmark District
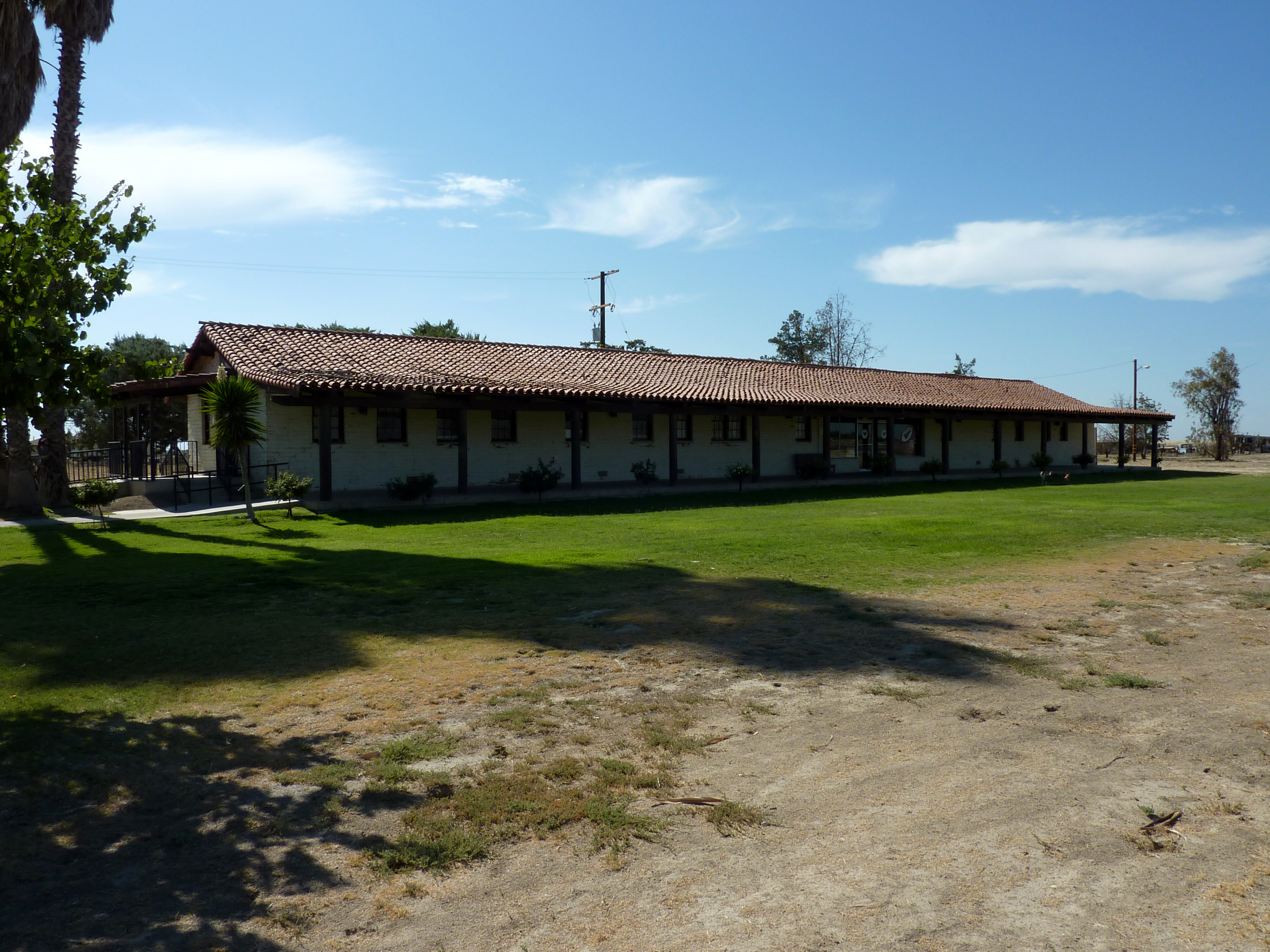

- Location within California Location within the United States
- Location: 30168 Garces Highway, Delano, California
- Coordinates: 35°45′48″N 119°17′15″W
- Area: 40 acres (16 ha)
- Architectural style: Mission Revival
- NRHP reference No.: 08001090
- Added to NRHP: October 6, 2008

The Forty Acres, located in Delano, California, was the first headquarters of the United Farm Workers labor union. The union acquired the site of the compound in 1966, and the buildings were built in the ensuing years. The first building constructed on the property was a service station built in 1967, and several smaller service buildings were built soon afterward. The main building on the property, the Mission Revival styled Reuther Hall, was built from 1968 to 1969; the hall was named for United Auto Workers organizer Roy Reuther. A health care clinic and a retirement village were added to the property in the early 1970s.

== Background ==
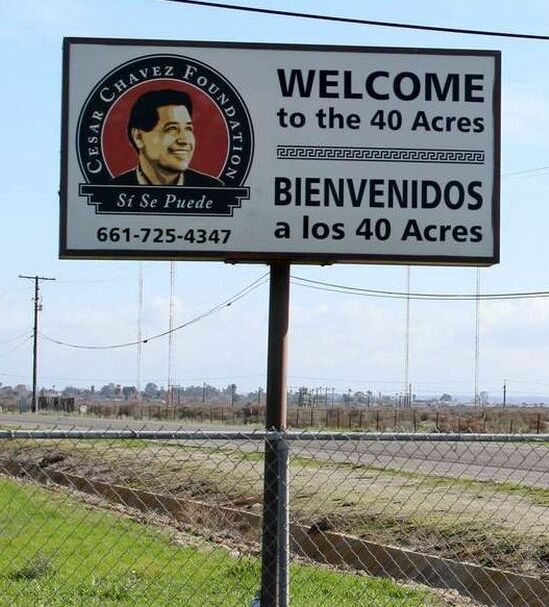
Bilingual Spanish welcome sign.

The Forty Acres is best known as the workplace of labor activist Cesar Chavez during the Delano grape strike of the 1960s. Chavez first drew national attention to the complex in 1968, when he conducted a public fast at the site. In 1970, union leaders and grape growers signed labor contracts ending the grape strike at Reuther Hall; the contracts unionized over 70,000 farmworkers working in the grape industry. After the strike, Chavez moved the union headquarters to a new complex; The Forty Acres continued to function as a service center for farmworkers and a local office for the union.

The Forty Acres was designated a National Historic Landmark on October 6, 2008. In October 2013, the site was identified as one of several to be part of a proposed new National Historical Park to commemorate the life and work of Chavez and the farm worker movement. Other sites for the proposed new park—which requires Congressional approval—include the Filipino Community Hall in Delano, California (headquarters of the Delano grape strike), Nuestra Senora Reina de la Paz (in Keene, Kern County, California), McDonnell Hall in San Jose, and the Santa Rita Center in Phoenix, Arizona.

== See also ==
- National Farm Workers Association Headquarters, also NRHP-listed in Delano
- United Farm Workers−related topics
- California Historical Landmarks in Kern County, California
- National Historic Landmarks in California
- National Register of Historic Places listings in Kern County, California
