= Teresa Romero =

American farm worker, labor leader, and civil rights activist (born 1958)

- Romero in 2022
- Born: June 18, 1958 (age 68); Mexico City, Mexico
- Occupations: Labor leader; Civil rights activist
- Awards: Presidential Medal of Freedom (2024)

Teresa Romero (born June 18, 1958) is a Mexican and American labor union leader. She is both the first woman and first Latina president of the United Farm Workers labor union.

== Early life ==
Romero was born in Mexico City, Mexico and grew up in Guadalajara. Her family was of Spanish and Zapotec ancestry. Romero cites the hard work of her parents to allow her and her siblings to go to school and how the Immigration Reform and Control Act of 1986 gave her a path to United States citizenship.

== Career ==
Romero both ran a law firm specializing in workers compensation claims and immigration law, and has also previously owned a consulting business for construction management. In 2018, she was working as secretary-treasurer for the United Farm Workers union when Arturo Rodriguez stepped down as president, picking Romero as his replacement. She became the first woman president of the union and first Latina to hold the position.

In 2020, Romero was named by Carnegie Corporation of New York as an honoree of the Great Immigrants Award. After the outbreak of the COVID-19 pandemic, Romero led the UFW to distribute protective gears and eventually COVID-19 vaccines.

In May 2024, Romero received the Presidential Medal of Freedom from President Joe Biden. Earlier that same year in February, she receive the Dolores C. Huerta Woman of Courage Award presented by the United States Hispanic Leadership Institute (USHLI).

Trade union offices
Preceded by Arturo Rodriguez (unionist)	President of the United Farm Workers; 2018–Present	Succeeded by Incumbent
