= Nagi Daifullah =

Union strike captain

Nagi Daifullah (1949 – August 1973; Arabic: ناجي ضيف الله ) was a Yemeni migrant to the United States and union organizer with the United Farm Workers. He was a strike captain during the 1973 grape farmers' strike organized by Cesar Chavez. Daifullah spoke Arabic, English and Spanish, and was integral in not only organizing the Yemeni community but also transcending ethnic and linguistic barriers between workers. One report by the United Farm Workers Organizing Committee comments on Daifullah's importance as a strike leader:

Nagi Daifullah came to this country from his native Yemen, looking for a better life. Yemenese farm workers are the latest group (as of 1977) to come to California and be exploited by state growers. Most of them, like Nagi, are young men in their early twenties, shy and slight of frame. Moslem, they speak no english and live in barren labor camps. They come because Yemen is one of the poorest countries in the world. In 1977, average annual income was $94. Nagi was 5 ft. tall and weighed 100 lbs. Unlike many of his fellow workers, he had learned English. Many times he served as an interpreter for union organizers. An active UFW member, he provided important leadership for workers on strike at Farms near Arvin and Lamont, California.

== Death ==
Daifullah was killed in August 1973 at the age of 24 by Kern County police when one officer beat him in the head with his flashlight and then dragged him so that his head continued hitting the pavement. Over 7,000 people attended Daifullah's funeral. A display features prominently in the Arab American Museum at Dearborn, Michigan, and the Orange County Democratic group has issued a Social Justice Award in Daifullah's name. Yemeni, Nicaraguan and Chinese janitorial workers in California who were struggling to organize with the Service Employees International Union (SEIU) drew on Daifalluh's legacy during their 2002 campaign.
