= Pablo Eduardo =

Bolivian sculptor

Pablo Eduardo is a Bolivian sculptor. He creates a wide variety of sculptures for many purposes. Although he sculpts in many different countries, most of his major works have been made in the United States, England, and Bolivia.

== Introduction ==
With important commissions in the United States, South America and Europe, Bolivian born sculptor Pablo Eduardo remains largely unknown to the general public and the art world establishment. Despite a large body of work in the hands of major public institutions and private collectors, Eduardo has been a well-kept secret for most of his professional life. His work is rooted in the figurative tradition of Renaissance and Baroque sculpture and the work of Michelangelo, Leonardo and Bernini specifically. Thus his output reflects a strong interest in representational work of the highest order.

== Biographical and educational background ==
Pablo Eduardo, born in La Paz, Bolivia in 1969, lives and works in Gloucester, Massachusetts. As of 2026, he 57 years old. is His interest in art as a young child is tied to early pottery classes he attended with his mother. As a young adult, Eduardo left Bolivia behind and embarked on a course of study and training. After travels in Europe and a year at the Studio Arts Center International in Florence, Italy from 1989 to 1990, he attended The School of the Museum of Fine Arts, Boston (MA), and graduated from Tufts University, where he received a Bachelor of Fine Arts in 1994. From 1990 to 1992, he completed Anatomical Studies at Tufts University Medical School in Boston where he focused on the dissection of the human body. This concentration provides a direct link to Michelangelo and Leonardo and the humanistic development of an art based on a clear physical understanding of bone, muscle and sinew.

== Context ==
Much of what Eduardo brings to his work can be traced to his birth and upbringing in Bolivia and the traditions of twentieth century Latin American art, including an affinity for hyperrealism and the intense emotionalism to which surrealism often subscribes. Pablo partakes of the New World's hybrid culture and the strong influence – aesthetic and intellectual – of European Enlightenment ideals, which helped forge the independent countries of the Americas in the nineteenth century. His generation is perhaps the last to include individuals who experienced the power of this link in Latin America. Indeed, many of his peers had already shifted their attention away from Paris and Rome to the world of the New York art scene on the one hand and to the autochthonous cultures of Latin America on the other.

Of his art and place in history Eduardo says the following: "For me sculpture conveys a force and poetry that echoes a sense of permanence. My work has its grounding in both classical technique and representation. I cannot, however, ignore my times or the culture that I come from, and so my work is a marriage in progress of all that is me. More importantly, however, is the fact my work has the freedom to go where it wants without hindrance. The only guiding imperative is to work honestly towards the kind of quality in sculpture that springs from the dedicated application of standards revealed through the work itself and its progressive development."

== Work ==
Eduardo's oeuvre comprises a broad range of sculptural work including related drawings and maquettes. His finished commissions are primarily cast bronze or carved stone. There are bas-reliefs and portrait busts, monumental figurative sculptural works in private and public settings including corporate collections, educational institutions, religious settings and public spaces. The figures he is asked to portray – e.g. Charles Darwin, St. Ignatius of Loyola, Cesar Chavez – are historically transformational. As a public artist, his projects are often collaborative and provide the opportunity to partner with architects and landscape architects. A good example is the Mayor Kevin White Tribute in Boston, Massachusetts, where he worked closely with the well-established firm of Halvorson Design Partnership to design the space that surrounds the monumental nine-foot bronze figure of Mayor White. His contributions to civic spaces in New England are significant as are those in South America. With the technical skill that allows him to imbue clay and bronze with the breath of life, Eduardo allows the viewer to imagine a place for tradition within the revolution that is always a part of contemporary art in the western world. A major example of his work is the monumental 10-foot bronze figure of St. Ignatius of Loyola located on the campus of Boston College. The figure is earthbound, but clearly caught in an ascending vortex of movement, which transcends its material.

== List of major works ==
Sir Thomas More, Bronze, Boston College, Chestnut Hill, MA, 2012

Charles Darwin, Bronze monument and plaza, Cold Spring Harbor Laboratories, Cold Spring Harbor, NY, 2010

Statue of Cesar Chavez, Bronze monument and plaza, University of Texas at Austin, Austin, TX, 2007

Mayor Kevin White Tribute, Dock Square Plaza with Bronze Sculpture, Faneuil Hall, Boston, MA, 2006

Harold Connolly, US Olympian, Small Plaza with Bronze Sculpture, Brighton, MA, 2005

Brian Honan, Memorial to Boston City Councilor, Bronze bas-relief, Honan Public Library, Allston-Brighton, MA, 2007

St. Ignatius of Loyola, Bronze monument and plaza, Boston College, Chestnut Hill, MA, 2005

Governor Lincoln Almond, Bronze portrait relief, University of Rhode Island, Kingston, RI, 2003

Christiana Carteaux Bannister, Bronze portrait bust, Rhode Island State House, Providence, RI, 2002

Elizabeth Baffum Chase, Bronze portrait bust, Rhode Island State House, Providence, RI, 2002

Fallen Angel "Paradise Lost," Bronze and Stone, W. Bolin, London, England, 2001

Jobab, Bronze and Stone, State of the Art Gallery, Ithaca, NY, 1998

Archangel Michael, Bronze and stone, for L. Mercado, La Paz, Bolivia, 1997

Tomb of Mario Mercado, Bronze and Stone, La Paz, Bolivia, 1994

Three Sculpted Doorways, Bronze and stone, main entrance to the Iglesia Nuestro Señor de la Exaltación, La Paz, Bolivia, 1996

Sarcophagus of a Dead Christ, Bronze, glass, wood, plaster, Iglesia Nuestro Señor de la Exaltación, La Paz, Bolivia, 2001

Marcelo Quiroga Santa Cruz Memorial and Statue, Bronze, Plaza, National Secretary of Culture, La Paz, Bolivia, 2005

Arthur Stickney, Portrait Bust, Bronze, Private Collection, 2002

William B. Gould, Dedham, Massachusetts, 2023
