= Keene, California =

Keene
- Unincorporated Community; Census Designated Place
- Location in Kern County and the state of California

- Location in the United States Keene (the United States)
- Coordinates: 35°13′25″N 118°33′44″W
- Country: United States
- State: California
- County: Kern

Government
  - State Senator: Shannon Grove (R)
  - Assemblymember: Stan Ellis (R)
  - U. S. Congress: Vince Fong (R)

Area
  - Total: 9.449 sq mi (24.473 km^{2})
  - Land: 9.444 sq mi (24.460 km^{2})
  - Water: 0.0050 sq mi (0.013 km^{2}) 0.05%
- Elevation: 2,602 ft (793 m)

Population (2020)
  - Total: 469
  - Density: 49.7/sq mi (19.2/km^{2})
- Time zone: UTC-8 (PST)
  - Summer (DST): UTC-7 (PDT)
- ZIP code: 93531
- Area code: 661
- FIPS code: 06-37946
- GNIS feature ID: 1660828

Keene (formerly Wells) is a census-designated place (CDP) in Kern County, California in the foothills of the Tehachapi Mountains at the southern extreme of the San Joaquin Valley. Keene is located 8.5 miles (14 km) northwest of Tehachapi, at an elevation of 2,602 feet (793 m). The population was 469 at the 2020 census, up from 431 at the 2010 census.

The headquarters of the United Farm Workers (UFW), a national farmworkers organization organized and led by Cesar Chavez, is located in Keene, and is sometimes referred to as "Nuestra Señora Reina de La Paz" ("Our Lady Queen of Peace").

Keene is located in the greater Tehachapi area.

== Geography ==
According to the United States Census Bureau, the CDP has a total area of 9.4 square miles (24 km^{2}), over 99% of which is land.

A small community, Woodford, of about 30 buildings once existed approximately one mile southeast of Keene.

=== Climate ===
Keene is categorized as being within the 8b USDA hardiness zone, meaning temperatures can get as low as 15 to 20 °F.

Climate data for Keene, CA (2,602 feet above sea level)
Month	Jan	Feb	Mar	Apr	May	Jun	Jul	Aug	Sep	Oct	Nov	Dec	Year
Record high °F (°C)	79.0 (26.1)	90.0 (32.2)	89.0 (31.7)	94.0 (34.4)	104.0 (40.0)	112.0 (44.4)	111.0 (43.9)	110.0 (43.3)	107.0 (41.7)	100.0 (37.8)	86.0 (30.0)	79.0 (26.1)	112.0 (44.4)
Mean daily maximum °F (°C)	57.0 (13.9)	60.0 (15.6)	66.0 (18.9)	71.0 (21.7)	81.0 (27.2)	90.0 (32.2)	97.0 (36.1)	96.0 (35.6)	88.0 (31.1)	78.0 (25.6)	65.0 (18.3)	56.0 (13.3)	75.4 (24.1)
Daily mean °F (°C)	45.5 (7.5)	48.5 (9.2)	53.5 (11.9)	58.5 (14.7)	68.5 (20.3)	77.0 (25.0)	83.5 (28.6)	82.0 (27.8)	74.5 (23.6)	64.0 (17.8)	52.5 (11.4)	44.5 (6.9)	62.7 (17.1)
Mean daily minimum °F (°C)	34.0 (1.1)	37.0 (2.8)	41.0 (5.0)	46.0 (7.8)	56.0 (13.3)	64.0 (17.8)	70.0 (21.1)	68.0 (20.0)	61.0 (16.1)	50.0 (10.0)	40.0 (4.4)	33.0 (0.6)	50.0 (10.0)
Record low °F (°C)	11.0 (−11.7)	16.0 (−8.9)	−5.0 (−20.6)	27.0 (−2.8)	34.0 (1.1)	38.0 (3.3)	43.0 (6.1)	48.0 (8.9)	38.0 (3.3)	22.0 (−5.6)	13.0 (−10.6)	8.0 (−13.3)	−5.0 (−20.6)
Average precipitation inches (mm)	1.20 (30)	1.58 (40)	0.97 (25)	0.23 (5.8)	0.10 (2.5)	0.04 (1.0)	0.32 (8.1)	0.28 (7.1)	0.14 (3.6)	0.37 (9.4)	0.60 (15)	0.89 (23)	6.72 (170.5)
Source: Weather Channel

== History ==
The Keene post office opened in 1879, closed in 1881, and re-opened in 1885. Keene was founded in 1876 with the name Wells as a railroad town. The name Wells honored Madison P. Wells, a local rancher. The town was renamed Keene in honor of James P. Keene, a financier.

=== César Chávez ===
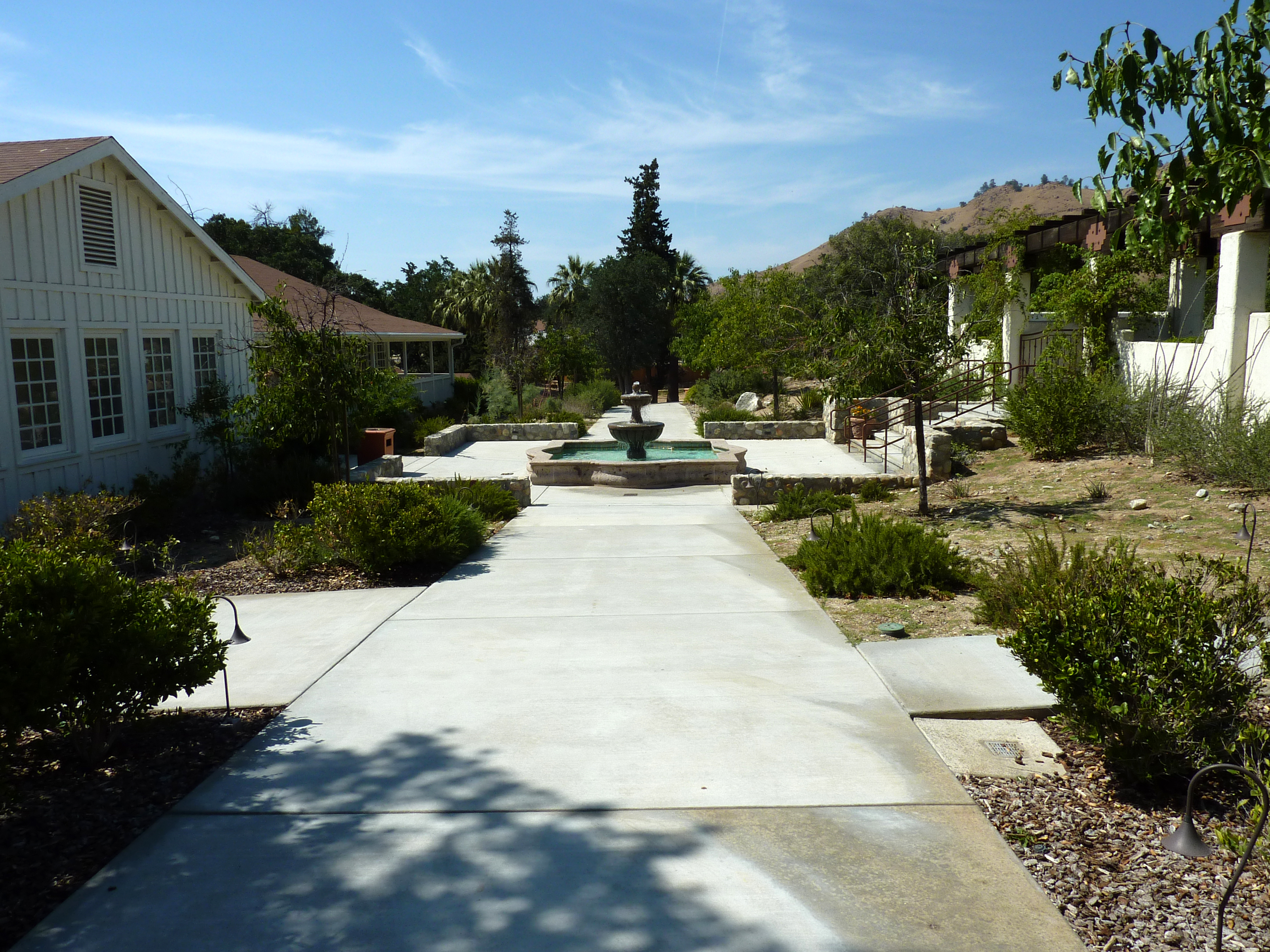
National Chavez Center

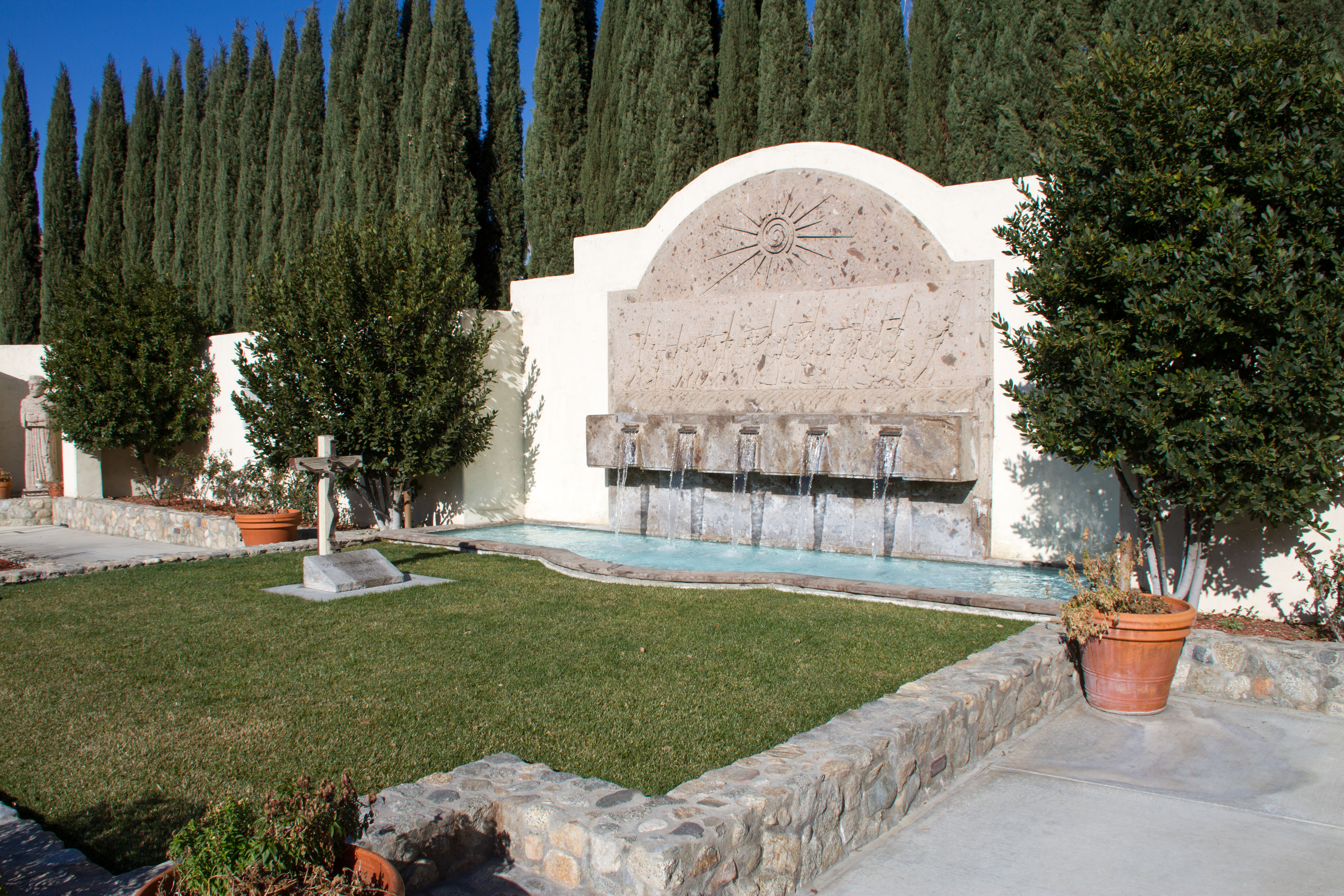
The gravesite of Cesar Chavez

The UFW moved its national headquarters to Keene from Delano, California. César Chávez spent his last years in Keene. The walls of his United Farm Workers office in Keene were lined with hundreds of books ranging in subject from philosophy, economics, cooperatives, and unions, to biographies of Gandhi, the Kennedys, and Che Guevara. He is buried at 29700 Woodford Tehachapi Rd, Keene, CA 93531, on the campus of the UFW headquarters.

The National Chavez Center was opened on the UFW campus in 2004 by the Cesar E. Chavez Foundation. It currently consists of a visitor center, memorial garden and the grave site of the civil rights leader. When it is fully completed, the 187-acre (0.76 km^{2}) site will include a museum and conference center to explore and share Chávez's work. A 2-acre (0.81 ha) parcel of the site was designated as César E. Chávez National Monument on October 8, 2012.

== Demographics ==
Historical population
Census	Pop.	Note	%±
2000	339		—
2010	431		27.1%
2020	469		8.8%
U.S. Decennial Census; 1860–1870 1880-1890; 1900 1910 1920; 1930 1940 1950; 1960 1970 1980; 1990 2000 2010; 2020

Keene first appeared as a census designated place in the 2000 U.S. census.

=== 2020 ===
Keene CDP, California – Racial and ethnic composition Note: the US Census treats Hispanic/Latino as an ethnic category. This table excludes Latinos from the racial categories and assigns them to a separate category. Hispanics/Latinos may be of any race.
Race / Ethnicity (NH = Non-Hispanic)	Pop 2000	Pop 2010	Pop 2020	% 2000	% 2010	% 2020
White alone (NH)	268	362	341	79.06%	83.99%	72.71%
Black or African American alone (NH)	8	2	7	2.36%	0.46%	1.49%
Native American or Alaska Native alone (NH)	9	2	5	2.65%	0.46%	1.07%
Asian alone (NH)	0	8	2	0.00%	1.86%	0.43%
Native Hawaiian or Pacific Islander alone (NH)	0	0	1	0.00%	0.00%	0.21%
Other race alone (NH)	3	1	0	0.88%	0.23%	0.00%
Mixed race or Multiracial (NH)	14	9	22	4.13%	2.09%	4.69%
Hispanic or Latino (any race)	37	47	91	10.91%	10.90%	19.40%
Total	339	431	469	100.00%	100.00%	100.00%

The 2020 United States census reported that Keene had a population of 469. The population density was 49.7 inhabitants per square mile (19.2/km^{2}). The racial makeup of Keene was 366 (78.0%) White, 9 (1.9%) African American, 8 (1.7%) Native American, 2 (0.4%) Asian, 2 (0.4%) Pacific Islander, 27 (5.8%) from other races, and 55 (11.7%) from two or more races. Hispanic or Latino of any race were 91 persons (19.4%).

The whole population lived in households. There were 184 households, out of which 56 (30.4%) had children under the age of 18 living in them, 103 (56.0%) were married-couple households, 17 (9.2%) were cohabiting couple households, 31 (16.8%) had a female householder with no partner present, and 33 (17.9%) had a male householder with no partner present. 52 households (28.3%) were one person, and 29 (15.8%) were one person aged 65 or older. The average household size was 2.55. There were 119 families (64.7% of all households).

The age distribution was 90 people (19.2%) under the age of 18, 18 people (3.8%) aged 18 to 24, 114 people (24.3%) aged 25 to 44, 127 people (27.1%) aged 45 to 64, and 120 people (25.6%) who were 65 years of age or older. The median age was 50.6 years. For every 100 females, there were 101.3 males.

There were 215 housing units at an average density of 22.8 units per square mile (8.8 units/km^{2}), of which 184 (85.6%) were occupied. Of these, 164 (89.1%) were owner-occupied, and 20 (10.9%) were occupied by renters.

=== 2010 ===
The 2010 United States census reported that Keene had a population of 431. The population density was 44.6 inhabitants per square mile (17.2/km^{2}). The racial makeup of Keene was 385 (89.3%) White, 2 (0.5%) African American, 10 (2.3%) Native American, 8 (1.9%) Asian, 0 (0.0%) Pacific Islander, 16 (3.7%) from other races, and 10 (2.3%) from two or more races. Hispanic or Latino of any race were 47 persons (10.9%).

The Census reported that 431 people (100% of the population) lived in households, 0 (0%) lived in non-institutionalized group quarters, and 0 (0%) were institutionalized.

There were 186 households, out of which 38 (20.4%) had children under the age of 18 living in them, 126 (67.7%) were opposite-sex married couples living together, 12 (6.5%) had a female householder with no husband present, 4 (2.2%) had a male householder with no wife present. There were 9 (4.8%) unmarried opposite-sex partnerships, and 2 (1.1%) same-sex married couples or partnerships. 36 households (19.4%) were made up of individuals, and 13 (7.0%) had someone living alone who was 65 years of age or older. The average household size was 2.32. There were 142 families (76.3% of all households); the average family size was 2.59.

The population was spread out, with 63 people (14.6%) under the age of 18, 22 people (5.1%) aged 18 to 24, 59 people (13.7%) aged 25 to 44, 213 people (49.4%) aged 45 to 64, and 74 people (17.2%) who were 65 years of age or older. The median age was 53.0 years. For every 100 females, there were 95.9 males. For every 100 females age 18 and over, there were 88.7 males.

There were 225 housing units at an average density of 23.3 per square mile (9.0/km^{2}), of which 157 (84.4%) were owner-occupied, and 29 (15.6%) were occupied by renters. The homeowner vacancy rate was 1.9%; the rental vacancy rate was 14.7%. 361 people (83.8% of the population) lived in owner-occupied housing units and 70 people (16.2%) lived in rental housing units.

== Education ==
Most of the CDP is served by the Tehachapi Unified School District, while a small section is served by the Caliente Union Elementary School District and the Kern High School Districts.
