= Cesar Chavez sexual abuse allegations =

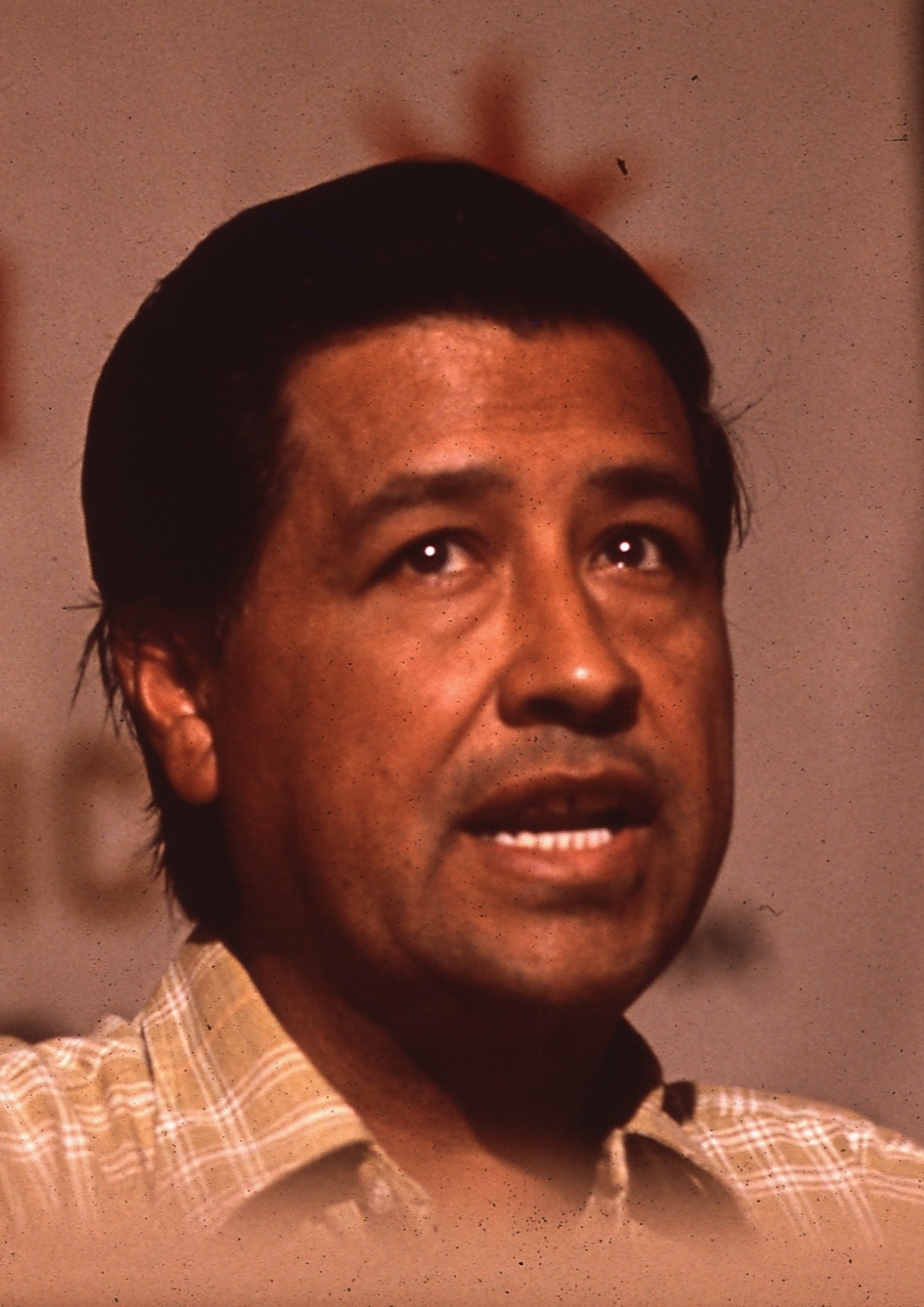
Chavez in 1972

In March 2026, allegations of sexual abuse were raised against American labor leader Cesar Chavez. Chavez, who died in 1993, co-founded United Farm Workers (UFW), a trade union for farmworkers that represented Latino workers across the United States and expanded civil rights advocacy. He was accused of rape and other forms of sexual and emotional abuse by several union affiliates, including co-founder Dolores Huerta, who alleged that Chavez had raped and impregnated her twice. Some have challenged the allegations, saying they lack evidence and noting that Chavez would not have the ability to defend himself.

Shortly before the release of an investigation by The New York Times, UFW learned of the allegations and began distancing themselves from Chavez. After allegations were publicized, many institutions and municipalities began removing his likeness from public spaces.

== Background ==
Aspects of Chavez's personal conduct had drawn scrutiny prior to the 2026 allegations. His adultery was documented by biographers; his wife Helen Chávez left him after intercepting a love letter from an 18-year-old woman. Biographer Miriam Pawel, author of The Crusades of Cesar Chavez, noted that there had been earlier suggestions that sex played a role in Chavez's efforts to control the movement, particularly during a period when some participants compared the UFW to a cult.

Pawel described a widespread culture of silence among movement participants who witnessed abuses of various kinds. In interviews conducted during the 2000s for her biography, she found that people who had been close to the movement had not spoken for decades about a range of problems, including verbal abuse, purges, violence, and anti-immigration actions. According to Pawel, they stayed silent because they believed strongly in the farmworker movement's power to improve conditions and did not want to say anything that might jeopardize its success.

== Investigation ==
The New York Times began investigating Chavez's history after receiving a tip in 2021. Reporters Manny Fernandez and Sarah Hurtes spent nearly five years on the story. Hurtes said that the survivors initially did not want to share their stories, and that it took a long time to build the trust required for them to go on the record. The reporters interviewed more than 60 people, including Chavez's former aides and relatives, and reviewed hundreds of pages of union records, emails, and photographs. During the investigation, the reporters found emails dating back more than 10 years in which union members discussed the abuse of the women who would later be named in the article.

Evidence of prior awareness of the allegations within UFW circles also emerged. In the early 2000s, union supporters informed Chavez's son Paul Chavez, who chairs the board of directors of the Cesar Chavez Foundation, of the allegations. When later asked about his reaction at the time, Paul Chavez responded: "It was unimaginable to me, just hard to process. You're talking about my dad." More than 10 years before the Times investigation, one of the survivors posted in a private Facebook group for longtime Chavez organizers and supporters, writing in part: "This man u [sic] march for every year molested me." She deleted the post several days later.

== History ==
=== Allegations ===
On March 17, 2026, United Farm Workers learned of sexual abuse allegations against Chavez, and in response, they canceled their tribute to Chavez just weeks before the annual event. UFW statements indicated that Chavez was accused of sexually abusing minors. Many celebrations were also cancelled nationwide.

The following day, The New York Times published an investigation stating that Chavez had sexually abused two adolescent girls on a regular basis between 1972 and 1977. One of the survivors was 13 years old when the alleged abuse began, and the other was 12; both women were now 66 years old when the allegations were made. Both women had known Chavez from very young ages, since their parents were involved in the union. They now describe his behavior towards them as grooming, and state that it began when they were around 8 or 9 years old. Both women have struggled with depression, panic attacks, and substance abuse in the years since. At least a dozen other women told the Times that they had also been harassed by Chavez over many years.

The survivors maintained their silence for decades, fearing that speaking out would tarnish Chavez's legacy, but decided in recent months, after being approached by reporters, that their stories also counted. Advocates and experts noted that delayed disclosure is common in cases of sexual abuse, particularly when the accused holds significant power or public reverence. Survivors may face fear of disbelief, public scrutiny, and blame, dynamics which can be compounded when the alleged abuser is a widely admired public figure.

Another woman reported to The New York Times that Chavez made sexual advances towards her in 1988, when she was 19 years old. Chavez had invited her to accompany him on an out-of-state speaking tour. He brought her into the camper he was staying in, and "pointed to a street sign outside bearing his name and suggested that he could use his influence to get something named for her if she slept with him". She refused his advances, and Chavez fired her from her job at a union health clinic about 10 months later. The woman's mother worked with Chavez as a union staffer and also reported that she had experienced unwanted sexual advances from Chavez in the 1970s when she was in her early 20s.

On March 18, Dolores Huerta also released a statement via Medium stating that Chavez sexually assaulted her on two separate occasions. Huerta stated that on one occasion, Chavez coerced and pressured her into sex, and on another occasion he "forced [her into sex], against [her] will" in an "environment where [she] felt trapped". Both assaults resulted in pregnancy, each of which Huerta carried to term, hiding the pregnancies with baggy clothing and ponchos. She then arranged for the children to be raised by others. The Times confirmed Chavez was biologically related to the children with DNA evidence.

Following the Times investigation, Huerta disclosed that she had told the now-adult individuals the truth about their conception several weeks before the article came out. Huerta further accused Chavez of emotional abuse, including yelling insults at her during a union board meeting and calling her a "stupid bitch". In a statement, Huerta said that she had not spoken out for fear that criticizing Chavez would hurt the farm workers' movement. Huerta came forward after learning the stories of the two other women named in the investigation. Chavez biographer Miriam Pawel reported that many other union members had similarly avoided speaking out about Chavez's behavior for fear of damaging the UFW's reputation.

=== Responses to allegations ===
The Chavez family stated to The New York Times that they were "not in a position to judge" the allegations, describing them as "deeply painful" and adding that they "honor the voices of those who feel unheard and who report sexual misconduct". Neither the family nor anyone from Chavez's inner circle publicly denied the allegations; instead, they were either silent or quietly confirmed the accounts. CNN and NPR noted that they had not independently verified the allegations described by the Times.

An opinion piece in the Catholic World Report questioned the speed of the public response, arguing that Chavez could not defend himself posthumously and noting that the Times investigation relied heavily on testimony rather than contemporaneous documentary evidence. The piece also noted that the Times itself acknowledged that nothing had emerged publicly to corroborate Huerta's specific claims, and that she had told no one until just weeks before the article was published. Former Black Panther Party leader Elaine Brown argued that the accusers should not have come forward decades after the alleged abuse, stating that Chavez "has been dead all this time and has no ability to defend himself". Brown called the discrediting of Chavez's work a "disgrace" that threatened to dismantle the farmworker movement. Some community members in Delano and Milwaukee also questioned the timing of the allegations and called for further investigation before public commemorations were altered. In Delano, longtime resident Lorena Ceballos stated that Chavez "is already dead, and he cannot defend himself". In Milwaukee, former farmworker Juan Salazar said he wanted more investigation into the allegations before changes were made, while business owner Alma Flores argued that Chavez's legacy should not be forgotten, citing his contributions to agricultural workers.

== Impact ==
The allegations prompted a swift and widespread response across the United States. Several states and cities canceled their yearly celebrations of Chavez, and The California Museum announced that it would remove Chavez from the state's Hall of Fame, the first such removal in its history. In Dallas, officials proposed replacing the local "Cesar Chavez Day" holiday with "Dolores Huerta Day."

Municipalities and institutions also moved to remove Chavez's likeness from public spaces. In California, the city council in San Fernando removed a statue from Cesar E. Chavez Memorial Park, while California State University, Fresno, and Santa Ana College moved to box or cover prominent monuments and murals. Elsewhere, a life-size statue was dismantled in Milwaukee and a bronze bust was removed from the Berkeley neighborhood of Denver. In Dallas, officials removed a statue and initiated the process of renaming a school and a boulevard. Within the rest of Texas, the Texas Education Agency released a document titled "Suspension of Instruction and Activities related to Cesar Chavez".

Several school districts and city governments began renaming assets bearing Chavez's name. School board members in Los Angeles called for the renaming of Cesar Chavez Elementary School in the El Sereno neighborhood. The Mayor of San Diego issued an executive order to remove Chavez's name from city assets, and the San Diego Unified School District began the process of renaming its own Cesar Chavez Elementary. Yonkers Public Schools renamed their Cesar E. Chavez School to Cedar Place Community School, named after the street where it’s located. The Portland City Council renamed César E. Chávez Boulevard to Campesinos Boulevard to honor the contributions of Latino farmworkers.

=== Debate over response ===
The speed of the public response drew both support and criticism. Some commentators and cultural figures urged a more deliberate approach to removing Chavez's name and likeness from public spaces. Muralist Judy Baca, who had created many monuments and murals featuring Chavez over the years, said her team was working on a thoughtful alternative rather than simply erasing his image, stating that her work was fundamentally about "non-erasure". Historian Sonya Chavez Metoyer cautioned against rushing to make decisions, suggesting that communities should instead reflect on the significance of the empty spaces left behind. Artist Paula Castillo, creator of a Chavez sculpture in Albuquerque, noted that the work had been designed to make collective labor and lived experience visible in civic space rather than to isolate a single figure, allowing it to continue holding meaning even as new information emerged.

In a column for Bloomberg Opinion, Erika D. Smith argued that the allegations demanded more than a swift cancellation, contending that a deeper reckoning was needed beyond simply removing Chavez's name from public spaces. Inside Higher Ed reported that experts on campus renaming cautioned against both rushing to name buildings and rushing to remove names, noting that previous efforts to strip names of problematic figures from university buildings had sometimes stalled or taken years.

=== Impact on the farmworker movement ===
Several advocates and commentators expressed concern that the fallout from the allegations could harm the ongoing farmworker movement. KQED Inc. reported that farmworking communities on the West Coast feared the scandal could undermine current efforts to improve working conditions. The Nebraska Examiner argued in an editorial that while canceling Chavez celebrations was understandable, the foundational principles of the labor movement should not be erased.

Chavez biographer Miriam Pawel noted in an interview with PBS NewsHour that Chavez's historical significance was difficult to overstate, describing him as "perhaps the most famous Latino in this country" and crediting him with the unique accomplishment of organizing the first union for farmworkers and teaching poor people that they could overcome the power of the agricultural industry through collective action. Some farmworkers interviewed by KQED expressed similar difficulty in accepting the allegations. One former agricultural worker in Fresno said he initially thought his coworkers must be discussing a different person, asking: "Which César Chavez are you talking about? Because I only know of one César Chavez who fought for farmworkers' rights."

Others argued that the movement should not be defined by any single individual. NBC News reported that scholars and activists were asking why a community was "only allowed to have one figure", noting the many other individuals who contributed to the Chicano Movement and farmworker rights but received less public recognition. Civil rights activist Rosie Castro pointed to figures such as Reies Lopez Tijerina and Rodolfo "Corky" Gonzales, who had led significant civil rights efforts during the same era but received far less national attention than Chavez. A Minnesota Reformer editorial noted that Filipino farmworkers, known as the Manongs, had launched the 1965 Delano Grape Strike that started the modern farmworker movement, and that this broader history mattered more than ever. The Chavez family said in a statement that "the movement has always been bigger than one person".

UFW president Teresa Romero acknowledged the difficulty of the situation, stating that each community would have to make its own decisions about how to handle naming and commemorations, while expressing respect for both the survivors and the thousands of people who had worked with the union over the years. Several officials proposed renaming Chavez-associated landmarks after other figures, particularly Dolores Huerta, or reframing commemorations around the farmworker movement as a whole rather than any single individual. Los Angeles Mayor Karen Bass renamed the city's Cesar Chavez Day holiday to "Farm Workers Day". In Denver, the mayor renamed the local holiday to "Sí Se Puede Day", after the movement's rallying cry coined by Huerta. On March 26, the California State Legislature unanimously passed a bill renaming the state's César Chavez Day holiday to Farmworkers Day; Governor Gavin Newsom signed the bill into law the same day.
