= Helen Fabela Chávez =

American labor activist (1928–2016)

- Born: Helen Fabela; January 21, 1928; Brawley, California, US
- Died: June 6, 2016 (aged 88); Bakersfield, California, US
- Occupation: UFW administrator
- Known for: Contributions to the labor activist movement of the United Farm Workers
- Spouse: Cesar Chavez (m. 1948; died 1993)
- Children: 8

Helen Fabela Chávez (January 21, 1928 – June 6, 2016) was an American labor activist for the United Farm Workers of America (UFWA). Aside from her affiliation with the UFW, she was a Chicana with a traditional upbringing and limited education. She was the wife of labor leader Cesar Chavez.

== Early life ==
Helen Fabela was born on January 21, 1928, in Brawley, California. She was a first generation Mexican-American. Her mother Eloisa Rodriguez was from Sombrerete, Mexico, and her father Vidal Fabela was from San Jacinto, Durango, Mexico. Both her parents immigrated to the USA separately after the Mexican Revolution, and eventually married in Los Angeles, California, in 1923. Both worked as migrant laborers, first in the Imperial Valley and later in the San Joaquín Valley and thus exposed her to the hardships of labor at an early age. She began working in the fields herself at age seven. After her father's death, when Helen was fifteen, she left high school to support her family which consisted of her mother, two sisters, and four brothers. Helen worked in a grocery store and eventually made her way to working in the fields and vineyards full-time.

== Married life ==
Fabela met Cesar Chavez in 1942 while she was still a student at Delano High School in California. Soon after his World War II service in the United States Navy ended, in 1945, he began spending more time with her. They dated "inexpensively — a walk in the moonlight or perhaps a movie." The couple was married in a civil ceremony on October 22, 1948, in Reno, Nevada. At the time, she was 20 years old. Then the two returned to San Jose, California for a church wedding. They departed for a two-week honeymoon before settling into their new lives together. Although she was trying to start her own family, she remained the main source of income for her siblings and parents. The newlyweds settled permanently in Delano, California. Over the next decade, the two grew to a family of ten with the total addition of eight children (Fernando, Sylvia, Linda, Eloise, Liz, Paul, Anna, and Anthony) and a later total of 31 grandchildren.

== Union organizing ==
Due to her father's involvement in the Mexican Revolution, Helen Chávez was influenced from a young age to be involved in political activism. She held the more 'traditional' role usually reserved for women. The traditional model for union organizing for women included the ability to "juggle the competing demands of family life, sexual division of labor, and protest in a unique blend of union activism." Helen and César soon became involved in labor organizing. By networking with their local Catholic priest, his name was passed to Fred Ross, an organizer of the Community Service Organization (CSO). César initially refused to work with Ross due to his Anglo background, but Helen persuaded him to eventually become a full-time CSO organizer. He became the National Director of the CSO in 1958.

== Dual commitments ==
Due to Helen Chávez's emphasis on home life as both a mother and a wife, the majority of credit for the labor movement went to her husband. Unlike some female labor activists of the time, her activities were not seeking limelight but essential in keeping the movement going. She helped in the office, mimeographing fliers or sorting the mail, but usually worked at home after her domestic chores were done and the children were asleep". Her involvement in CSO activities is often overshadowed by her husband's political involvement, although, "the voluntarism of Helen Chávez and other women behind the scenes made the CSO one of the most successful associations for Mexican Americans in California during that time". Not only caring for and raising her eight children, she also worked tirelessly ten hours a day supporting her family. Between family and work, she dedicated all of her spare time to assisting with CSO business. She also taught literacy classes for migrant workers during voting drives and later assisted them in gaining US citizenship. She was also in charge of handwriting the CSO daily reports that her husband dictated (CSO).

== Later involvements ==
Cesar Chavez resigned from the CSO in 1962 to start the Farm Workers Association, later known as the National Farm Workers Association, thus moving the family back to Delano. While he was building the new union, Helen Chávez picked up a job working in a field picking grapes for less than $2.00 per day. The NFWA soon voted her to a full-time position as the administrator in charge of the credit union.

She quickly mastered the necessary bookkeeping skills and took full command of the association's financial record-keeping, managing the operation with steady determination for more than 25 years loaning out more than $20 million, which is equivalent to $100M today.

In 1965, they debated whether to join a grape strike begun by Filipino workers, in her no nonsense way she settled the debate by asking "Are we a union or not?" This was the impetus for the start of the United Farm Workers Union. In 1965, the NFWA merged with the Agricultural Workers Organizing Committee (AWOC) to become the United Farm Workers Organization Committee (UFWOC). Cesar and Helen Chávez's efforts became known as La Causa (the Cause). Using nonviolent alternatives for change such as protests, strikes, boycotts, pickets, fasts and marches, the UFWOC fought for fair labor practices. She was involved in the demand for union recognition during all demonstrations and was arrested in 1966 for shouting Huelga! ("Strike!") at the W. B. Camp ranch.

== Accomplishments ==
Chávez mostly maintained the traditional role of a woman involved in such movements by assisting in the administrative parts of the process and by staying out of the public eye. Her most public moments were her "four arrests, two of which were widely reported" and although her "acts of civil disobedience have been few, her example has encouraged other Mexicanas and Chicanas to undergo arrest" for the sake of the greater good. Chávez challenged the role of women in the activist movement and provided a template for other Hispanic women who may eventually join the union efforts.

Chávez's personal experience of the hardships of working the fields made her an invaluable part of the spirit of the movement. Her involvement and passion for the cause became a huge motivator for other Latinos to join the union efforts. In 1974, news of her efforts spread as far as Europe. It was in 1994, a year after her husband's death, that she accepted the US Presidential Medal of Freedom in her husband's honor. Due to the existing sexual division of labor in the union and systemic sexism in society, few women have been recognized for their contributions to labor movements. She still remained invisible — unrecognized and unappreciated by union members and supporters.

In 2008 Helen Chávez received the Latina of the Year award from the Los Angeles Chapter of the National Latino Peace Officers Association.

Helen Chávez was played by America Ferrera in Diego Luna's 2014 film Cesar Chavez.

In 2023, on what would have been her 95^{th} birthday the first annual Helen Fabela Chavez Legacy Scholarship Breakfast was held at MNC Inspiring Success, money raised established a scholarship fund for college students. To date her fund has awarded $80,000 to first generation college students.

On June 23, 2026 the Bakersfield City School District voted unanimously to an elementary school after her, the first in the country.

== Death ==
On June 6, 2016, Chávez died at a Bakersfield hospital at the age of 88. Chávez is buried in Keene, California alongside her husband.
