= United Farm Workers =

American trade union

- United Farm Workers of America
- Logo designed by Richard Chavez in 1962

- Flag designed by Manuel Chavez in 1962
- Abbreviation: UFW
- Formation: August 22, 1966
- Merger of: National Farm Workers Association; Agricultural Workers Organizing Committee
- Type: Trade union
- Headquarters: Keene, California, US
- Location: United States
- Members: 4,904 (2025)
- President: Teresa Romero
- Affiliations: Strategic Organizing Center
- Website: ufw.org

The United Farm Workers of America, or more commonly just United Farm Workers (UFW), is a labor union for farmworkers in the United States. It was founded in 1966 through the merger of two workers' rights organizations, the National Farm Workers Association (NFWA) led by César Chávez, Dolores Huerta, and Gilbert Padilla, and the Agricultural Workers Organizing Committee (AWOC) led by organizer Larry Itliong. Notable strike captains within the movement also include Nagi Daifullah.

They allied and transformed from workers' rights organizations into a union as a result of a series of strikes in 1965, when the Filipino-American, Mexican-American, and Yemeni-American farmworkers of the AWOC in Delano, California, initiated a grape strike, and the NFWA went on strike in support. As a result of the commonality in goals and methods, the NFWA and the AWOC formed the United Farm Workers Organizing Committee in August 1966.

This organization was accepted into the AFL-CIO in 1972 and changed its name to the United Farm Workers Union. The UFW disaffiliated from the AFL–CIO in 2006.

== History ==
=== Founding of the UFW ===
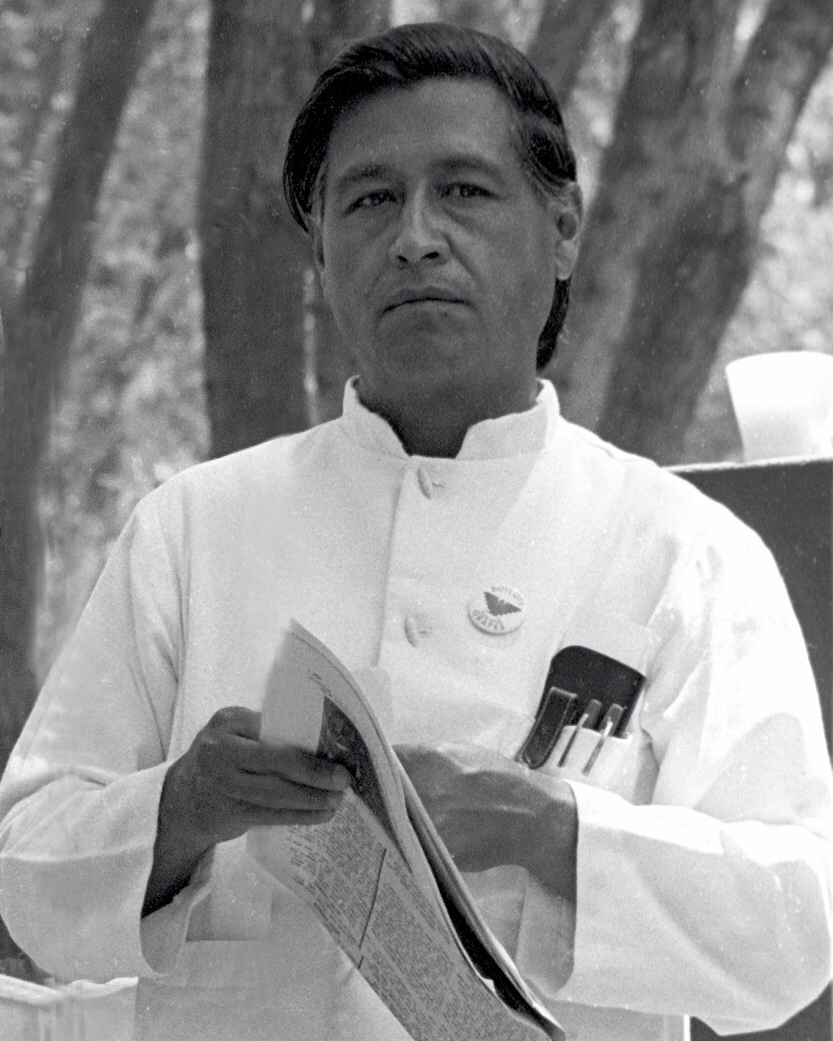
César Chávez speaking at the Delano UFW−United Farm Workers rally in Delano, California, June 1972

In 1952, César Chávez met Fred Ross, who was a community organizer working on behalf of the Community Service Organization. During Chávez's participation in the Community Service Organization, Fred Ross trained César Chávez in the grassroots, door-to-door, house meeting tactic of organization, a tactic crucial to the UFW's recruiting methods. The house meeting tactic successfully established a broad base of local Community Service Organization chapters during Ross's era, and Chávez used this technique to extend the UFW's reach as well as to find up and coming organizers. In the 1950s, Chávez and Ross developed 22 new Community Service Organization chapters in the Mexican-American neighborhoods of San Jose.

The role of César Chávez, a co-founder of UFW, was to frame his campaigns in terms of consumer safety and involving social justice, bringing benefits to the farmworker unions. One of UFW's, along with Chávez's, important aspects that has been overlooked is building coalitions.

The United Farm Workers allows farmworkers to help improve their working conditions and wages. The UFW embraces nonviolence in its attempt to cultivate members on political and social issues.

In 1959, Chávez achieved the rank of executive director in the Community Service Organization. He established professional relationships with local community organizations that aimed to empower the working class population by encouraging them to become more politically active. One of these was the Agricultural Workers Association (AWA). Dolores Huerta created the AWA in 1960. Larry Itliong was a Filipino American labor organizer who fore fronted the grape strike in Coachella Valley that led to the Delano Grape Strike of 1965. He became assistant director of the UFW. Chávez was the leader and also a gifted public speaker. Huerta was a skilled organizer and negotiator.

Chávez's ultimate goal in participating with the Community Service Organization and the Industrial Areas Foundation was to organize a union for farm workers. In March 1962, at the Community Service Organization convention, Chávez proposed a pilot project for organizing farm workers, which the organization's members rejected. Saul Alinsky did not share Chávez's sympathy for the farm workers' struggle, claiming that organizing farm workers was like fighting on a constantly disintegrating bed of sand. Chávez responded by resigning to create the farm workers union that later became known as the National Farm Workers Association.

In 1962, Richard Chavez, the brother of César Chávez, designed the black Aztec eagle insignia that became the symbol of the NFW and the UFW. César Chávez chose the red and black colors used by the organization. By 1965, the National Farm Workers Association had acquired twelve hundred members through Chávez's person-to-person recruitment efforts, which he had learned from Fred Ross a decade earlier. Out of those twelve hundred, only about two hundred paid dues.

A variety of services were offered to union members during this early period, such as local medical clinics. During the grape strike of 1965 in Delano California, medical volunteers and UFW leadership began establishing medical clinics for workers due to a noticeable lack of affordable and accessible medical facilities in the area. The first clinics were established within local homes after the strike began. Wanting to expand the clinics, the UFW began sending letters to potential donors and supporters, which resulted in them receiving needed medical supplies and a trailer to act as an additional building for the clinic. These trailers served as the UFW's main clinic in Delano until 1972 when they were closed down in favor of opening the Terronez Clinic.

The National Farm Workers Association (NFWA) (Note: Later to merge with the AWOC to become the United Farm Workers) 1965 rent strike in response to the Tulare County Housing Authority raising their rents

Although still in its infant stages, the organization lent its support to a strike by workers in the rose industry in 1965. This initial protest by the young organization resulted in a failed attempt to strike against the rose industry. That same year, the farm workers who worked in the Delano fields of California wanted to strike against the growers in response to the growers' refusal to raise wages from $1.20 to $1.40 an hour, and they sought out Chávez and the National Farm Workers Association for support.

Before UFW became an official trade union affiliated with the AFL–CIO, the National Farm Workers Association was formed as a social movement organization more akin to a mutual-aid society inspired by the mutualistaser than a trade union. However, when they joined the Agricultural Workers Organizing Committee (AWOC), led by Larry Itliong, in a grape strike in 1965, the group soon took on the characteristics of a trade union and gained official union status with the AFL–CIO.

The Delano agricultural workers were mostly Filipino workers affiliated with the Agricultural Workers Organizing Committee, a charter of the American Federation of Labor and Congress of Industrial Organizations. The unification of these two organizations, in an attempt to boycott table grapes grown in the Delano fields, resulted in the creation of the United Farm Workers of America. The AFL–CIO chartered the United Farm Workers, officially combining the AWOC and the NFWA, in August 1966. By 1967, the UFW advanced public support by initiating a focus on the safety implications of pesticide susceptibility. The union aimed to link farmworker safety and consumer health through DDT (Dichlorodiphenyltrichloroethane), leveraging support from environmental groups to form collaborative campaigns.

During the early years of the UFW, one of their most prominent allies was Senator Robert F. Kennedy. In March 1966, Kennedy visited and spoke with union members participating in the Delano grape strike and later conducted a hearing on migrant farm workers with senators George Murphy and Harrison Williams. In 1967, Kennedy attended a UFW fundraiser where he felt threatened by a man in the crowd. In response, union members protected Kennedy so he could safely leave the event.

Kennedy's connection to and support of the UFW helped to give national momentum to the grape strike. When Kennedy began to campaign in the Democratic primary, the UFW suspended all strikes to campaign alongside him, leading to high turnout amongst them and their allies. The assassination of Kennedy greatly affected UFW members and their communities. Farm workers in Delano held a mass in his honor.

The union publicly adopted the principles of non-violence championed by Mahatma Gandhi and Martin Luther King Jr. On July 22, 2005, the UFW announced that it was joining the Change to Win Federation (now known as the Strategic Organizing Center), a coalition of labor unions functioning as an alternative to the AFL–CIO. On January 13, 2006, the union officially disaffiliated from the AFL–CIO. In contrast to other Change to Win-affiliated unions, the AFL–CIO neglected to offer the right of affiliation to regional bodies to the UFW.

=== Historic complications in organizing farm workers prior to UFW formation ===
In the early history of American agriculture, farmworkers experienced many failed attempts to organize agricultural laborers. In 1903, Japanese and Mexican farm workers attempted to unite to fight for better wages and working conditions. This attempt to form a collective action was ignored and disbanded when organizations, such as the American Federation of Labor, neglected to support their efforts, often withholding assistance on the basis of race.

In 1913, the Industrial Workers of the World organized a rally of two thousand farm workers at a large ranch in a rural area of Northern California. This resulted in an attack by National Guardsmen against participants. As a result of the violence, the two lead organizers for the Industrial Workers of the World were arrested, convicted of murder, and sentenced to life imprisonment. Some believe the two people arrested were wrongly convicted.

In the late 1910s and the 1920s in the United States, further attempts to organize farm laborers were undertaken by spontaneous local efforts, and some by communist unions. These attempts also failed because, at that time, the law did not require employers to negotiate with workers. Employers at the time could legally fire employees for union activity.

In 1936, the National Labor Relations Act took effect. This legislation provided most American workers the right to join unions and bargain collectively. Agricultural workers were exempt from the protection of this law. Some believe that this labor category was excluded as a result of a political tactic to gain the support of Southern politicians in the passing of this law.

In 1941, the United States and Mexican Governments enacted the Bracero Program. Initially, the two governments established this joint project to address Second World War labor shortages by allowing "guest workers" from Mexico to work in the American agricultural industry until the end of the crop harvest. Thousands of Mexican citizens came north to work in American fields, and growers used the opportunity to undercut domestic wages. They also used the Braceros to break strikes by resident farmworkers. This program was extended until 1964.

=== Gendered divisions of labor in the UFW ===
Many Mexican women in California who joined the UFW in the 1960s had been previously involved in community-based activism in the 1950s through the Community Service Organization for Latino civil rights. The racial discrimination and economic disadvantages they faced from a young age made it necessary to form networks of support like the CSO to empower Latinos in America with voter registration drives, citizenship classes, lawsuits and legislative campaigns, and political protests against police brutality and immigration policies.

While male activists held leadership roles and more authority, the women activists participated in volunteering and teaching valuable skills to individuals of the Latino community. By the 1960s, Dolores Huerta and others began to shift their attention to the labor exploitation of Latino farm workers in California and began to strike, demonstrate, and organize to fight for a myriad of issues that Mexican laborers faced. While many of the male leaders of the movement had the role of being dynamic, powerful speakers that inspired others to join the movement, the women devoted their efforts to negotiating better working contracts with companies, organizing boycotts, rallying for changes in immigration policies, registering Latinos to vote with Spanish language ballots, and increasing pressure on legislation to improve labor relations.

Among the women who engaged in activism for labor rights, traditional and non traditional patterns of activism existed. Mexican-American women like Dolores Huerta used their education and resources to arrange programs at the grassroots level, sustaining and leading members into the labor movement. As the sister-in-law of César Chávez, Huerta had great influence over the direction that it took.

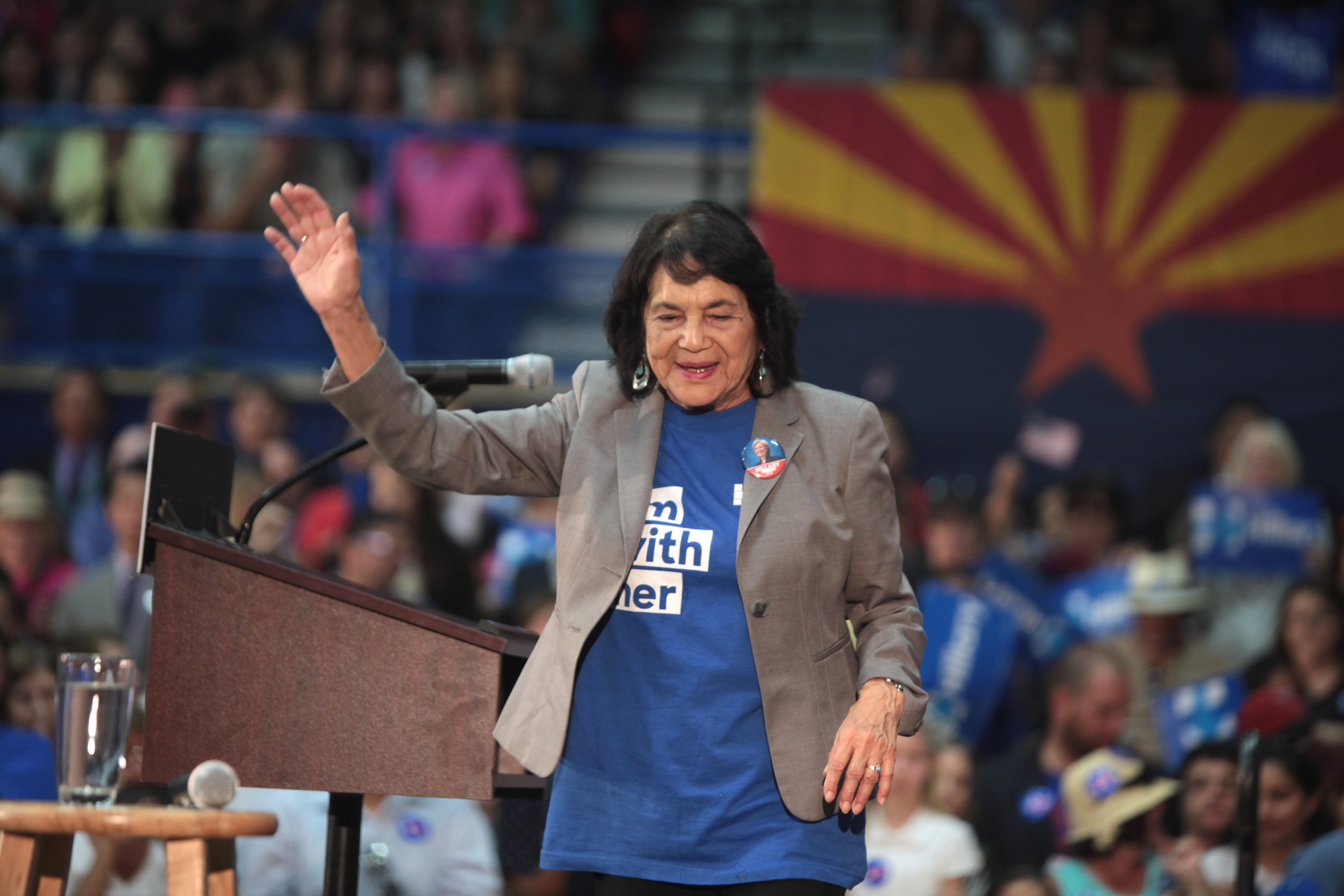
Dolores Huerta in 2016, speaking at a Hillary Clinton rally

Between 1964 and 1965, Gilbert Padilla and Huerta organized wine and liquor boycotts throughout California. In 1968, Huerta led the boycotts of grapes within the east coast, successfully convincing other unions, such as the seafarer union, to join their cause while also getting multiple pro-union neighborhoods in New York to join the boycotting of stores that sold from grapes striking farms. By 1973, Huerta began to act as a lobbyist for the UFW in the California State congress. During this period, she testified in favor of both Latino and Latina voting rights as well as further protections for farm workers.

It was most common for Chicana activists and female labor union members to be involved in administrative tasks for the early stages of UFW. Women like Helen Chávez were important in responsibilities such as credit union bookkeeping and behind the scenes advising. Still, both women along with other Chicana activists participated in picketing with their families in the face of police intimidation and racial abuse. Keeping track of union services and membership were traditionally responsibilities given to female organizers and it was integral to the institutional survival of the UFW, but it has gone much less recognized throughout history due to the male led strikes receiving majority public attention.

Recent developments have come to light with accusations of sexual abuse against Cesar Chavez. One victim in particular, Dolores Huerta, was a well known representative within the UFW’s movement, and had also made allegations against Chavez. Recent events have shown that more victims are coming out to speak against Cesar Chavez as well.

=== Texas strike ===
In May 1966, California farm worker activist Eugene Nelson traveled to Texas and organized local farmworkers into the Independent Workers' Association. At the time, some melon workers lacked access to freshwater while working in the fields, some lacked sanitary facilities for human waste, and some were present in the fields as crop dusters dropped pesticides on the crops. These problems created a hazardous workspace and altered the environment for workers and the union. This situation enabled the UFW to argue that sustainable agricultural initiatives are not merely a regulatory obstacle but a basic civil right for workers. On June 1, Nelson led workers to strike to protest poor working conditions and demanded $1.25 as a minimum hourly wage. Workers picketed and were arrested by Texas Rangers and local police. Day laborers arrived from Mexico to harvest the crop, and by the end of June, the strike had failed.

On July 4, members of UFWOC, strikers, and members of the clergy set out on a march to Austin to demand the $1.25 minimum wage and other improvements for farm workers. Press coverage intensified as the marchers made their way north in the summer heat. Politicians, members of the AFL–CIO, and the Texas Council of Churches accompanied the protestors. Gov. John Connally, who had refused to meet them in Austin, traveled to New Braunfels with then House Speaker Ben Barnes and Attorney General Waggoner Carr to intercept the march and inform strikers that their efforts would have no effect.

Protestors arrived in Austin in time for a Labor Day rally, but no changes in law resulted. Strikes and arrests continued in Rio Grande City through 1966 into 1967. Violence increased as the spring melon crop ripened and time neared for the May harvest. In June, when the beatings of two UFWOC supporters by Texas Rangers surfaced, tempers flared.

At the end of June, as the harvest was ending, members of the Senate Subcommittee on Migratory Labor, including Senators Harrison Williams and Edward Kennedy, arrived in the lower Rio Grande Valley to hold hearings in Rio Grande City and Edinburg, Texas. The senators took their findings back to Washington as a report on pending legislation. Subsequently, the rangers left the area and, the picketing ended. On September 20, Hurricane Beulah's devastations ruined the farming industry in the Valley for the following year. One major outcome of the strikes was a 1974 Supreme Court victory in Medrano v. Allee, which limited the jurisdiction of the Texas Rangers in labor disputes. Farm workers continued to organize through the 1970s on a smaller scale, under new leadership in San Juan, Texas, independent of César Chávez.

=== Texas campaign ===
By mid-1971, the Texas campaign was well underway. In Sept. 1971, Thomas John Wakely, recently discharged from the United States Air Force, joined the San Antonio office of the Texas campaign. His pay was room and board, $5.00 a week, plus all of the menudo he could eat. The menudo was provided to the UFOC staff by the families of migrant workers working the Texas fields.

TJ worked for UFOC for about 2 years, during which he organized the Grape Boycott in San Antonio. His primary target was the H-E-B grocery store chain. In addition, he attempted to organize Hispanic farm workers working the farmers' market in San Antonio—an institution at that time controlled by the corporate farms. Among his many organizing activities was an early 1972 episode where he and several other UFOC staff members, who were attempting to organize warehouse workers in San Antonio, were fired upon by security agents of the corporate farm owners.

In mid-1973, the San Antonio office of the UFOC was taken over by the Brown Berets. This radicalization of the San Antonio UFOC office led to the eventual collapse of the San Antonio UFOC organizing campaign.

=== 1970s ===
Membership (US records). View source data.

Finances (US records; ×$1000). View source data.

In 1970, Chávez decided to move the union's headquarters from Delano to La Paz, California, into a former sanatorium in the Tehachapi Mountains. Whereas Chávez thought this change would help create "a national union of the poor ... serving the needs of all who suffer", other union members objected to this distancing of the leadership away from the farmworkers.

The union was poised to launch its next major campaign in the lettuce fields in 1970 when a deal between the International Brotherhood of Teamsters and the growers nearly destroyed it. Initially, the Teamsters signed contracts with lettuce growers in the Salinas Valley, who wanted to avoid recognizing the UFW. Then, in 1973, when the three-year UFW grape contracts expired, the grape growers signed contracts granting the Teamsters the right to represent the workers who had been UFW members.

The UFW responded with strikes, lawsuits and boycotts, including secondary boycotts in the retail grocery industry. The union struggled to regain the members it had lost in the lettuce fields; it never fully recovered its strength in grapes, partially due to incompetent management of the hiring halls it had established that seemed to favor some workers over others.

In 1972, the UFW opened the Terronez Clinic in Delano, California. The clinic was primarily staffed by volunteer doctors and nurses who recently graduated from medical school, along with an administrative staff made up of local supporters. By the end of their first year, the clinic had served an estimated 23,000 farm workers and their families. Due to its success, the UFW opened other clinics in Calexico and Salinas. By 1978, the UFW Executive Board decided to end the programs due to dwindling resources.

The battles in the fields became violent, with several UFW members killed on the picket line. The violence led the state in 1975 to enact the California Agricultural Labor Relations Act, creating an administrative agency, the ALRB, that oversaw secret-ballot elections and resolved charges of unfair labor practices, such as failing to bargain in good faith or discrimination against activists. The UFW won the majority of secret ballot elections in which it participated. In the late 1970s, the UFW's leadership was wracked by a series of conflicts as differences emerged between Chávez and some of his former colleagues. To maintain union membership and strength, the UFW began to control local chapters' activities, leading some longtime staffers to resign. Prominent Filipino activist Philip Vera Cruz also left the UFW in 1977 after Chavez accepted an invitation from the then-dictator Ferdinand Marcos to visit the Philippines. In 1977, the Teamsters signed an agreement with the UFW promising to end their efforts to represent farm workers.

=== 1980s ===
In the 1980s, the membership of the UFW shrank, as did its national prominence. After taking office in the 1980s, California Governor George Deukmejian stopped enforcement of the state's farm labor laws, resulting in farm workers losing their UFW contracts, being fired, and blacklisted. Due to internal squabbles, most of the union's original leadership left or were forced out, except for Chávez and Huerta. By 1986, the union had been reduced to 75 contracts and had stopped organizing.

In the 1980s, the UFW joined with the AFL–CIO and other organizations for the national Wrath of Grapes campaign, reinstituting the grape boycott.

In the early 1980s, Tomas Villanueva, a well-known organizer who had a reputation for his activism for farm workers, agreed to help the UFW when they were in need of a leader for their march in Washington state. Villanueva joined César Chávez in organizing the boycotts and strikes that occurred in Washington state.

On September 21, 1986, Villanueva became the first president of the Washington state UFW. He was a great leader for the UFW activists in Washington since he led many strikes and influenced people to join the United Farm Workers movement. People who were against the movement started threatening leaders of the group such as Villanueva, but he continued organizing rallies. Even though there was some success in Washington state, the overall UFW membership started decreasing towards the end of the 1980s.

During this time, there were many attempts by the Reagan administration to deregulate Occupational Safety and Health Administration (OSHA). After being placed in office, there were several budget cuts and many people within this field lost their jobs. Within that time, organizations such as OSHA began to show a decline in workplace inspections leaving business practices to their own devices on such matters.

Many efforts were put into place to try and defund pesticide and agricultural regulations. One such person, interested in this change was running governor, at the time, George Deukmejian. Deukmejian tried to show that he was on the growers’ side of the matters and went as far as to label the workers union as agitators and vandals. Not long after, the agricultural associations began to fund his campaign. True to his word, when he was elected governor, he pushed a number of “grower-backed” bills.

In an attempt to align people with his cause and gain more backing, Cesar Chavez began a boycott under his leadership, branded as a movement in favor of “safe food”. This boycott went directly against the current governor of that time. Pesticides were not addressed until a year later, in 1982.

This changed when a major scare over pesticides became well known in California at the time; watermelons would make the farm workers and consumers very ill. The UFW was outraged to hear about the use of illegal pesticides, and Chávez decided to fast for 36 days to protest the dangers pesticides had on farm workers and their community. This influenced the legislature in California to create more food testing programs, resulting in pesticide-free produce, and to encourage organic farming.

=== Recent developments ===
In July 2008, farm worker Ramiro Carrillo Rodriguez, 48, died of a heat stroke. According to United Farm Workers, he was the "13th farm worker heat death since CA Governor Schwarzenegger took office" in 2003. In 2006 California's first permanent heat regulations were enacted but these regulations were not strictly enforced, the union contended.

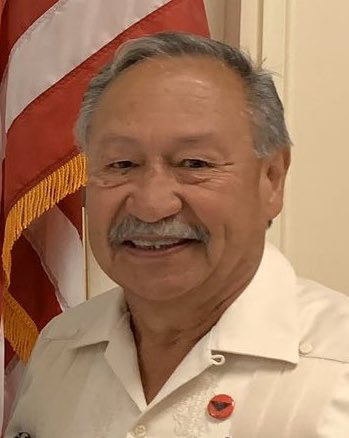
Arturo "Artie" Rodríguez, former President of the UFW

In 2013, farm workers working at a Fresno facility, for California's largest peach producer, voted to de-certify the United Farm Workers. News of this decertification was released to the public in 2018.

César Chávez is a film released in March 2014, directed by Diego Luna about the life of the Mexican-American labor leader who co-founded the United Farm Workers. The film stars Michael Peña as Chávez. Co-producer John Malkovich also co-stars in the role of an owner of a large industrial grape farm who leads the sometimes violent opposition to Chávez's organizing efforts.

The Darigold Dozen are 12 dairy farm workers from Washington who filed a lawsuit against Ruby Ridge Dairy in Pasco where they are employed, for wage theft. The UFW held a five-day fast on September 20, 2018, outside the Darigold headquarters to protest the poor work condition and treatments the Darigold farmers face and to bring attention to the Darigold Dozen. On May 8, 2019, the employers of the Darigold Dozen dropped their countersuit against their former employees and dropped a lawsuit that they had filed against the UFW.

== Geography ==
The grape strike officially began in Delano in September 1965. In December, union representatives traveled from California to New York, Washington, DC, Pittsburgh, Detroit, and other large cities to encourage a boycott of grapes grown at ranches without UFW contracts.

In the summer of 1966, unions and religious groups from Seattle and Portland endorsed the boycott. Supporters formed a boycott committee in Vancouver, prompting an outpouring of support from Canadians that continued throughout the following years.

In 1967, UFW supporters in Oregon began picketing stores in Eugene, Salem, and Portland. After melon workers went on strike in Texas, growers held the first union representation elections in the region, and the UFW became the first union to ever sign a contract with a grower in Texas.

National support for the UFW continued to grow in 1968, and hundreds of UFW members and supporters were arrested. Picketing continued throughout the country, including in Massachusetts, New Jersey, Ohio, Oklahoma, and Florida. The mayors of New York, Baltimore, Philadelphia, Buffalo, Detroit, and other cities pledged their support, and many of them altered their cities' grape purchases to support the boycott.

In 1969, support for farm workers increased throughout North America. The grape boycott spread into the South as civil rights groups pressured grocery stores in Atlanta, Miami, New Orleans, Nashville, and Louisville to remove non-union grapes. Student groups in New York protested the Department of Defense and accused them of deliberately purchasing boycotted grapes. On May 10, UFW supporters picketed Safeway stores throughout the US and Canada in celebration of International Grape Boycott Day. César Chávez also went on a speaking tour along the East Coast to ask for support from labor groups, religious groups, and universities.

There were over 1,000 UFW strikes, boycotts, protests, and other farm worker actions between 1965 and 1975, as collected by El Malcriado, Los Angeles Times, New York Times, and Seattle Times.

Between 1965 and 1975 the United Farm Workers activism throughout the United States saw a tremendous increase. UFW started with the 7 states of California, New York, Washington, DC, Mississippi, Arizona, Illinois, and Texas. The movement and fight for change expanded to a total of 42 states in the span of 10 years.

Other organizations that followed in the United Farm Workers fight to empower and seek justice for farm workers are Farm Labor Organizing Committee (FLOC) (1967), Treeplanters & Farmworkers United of the Northwest (PCUN) (1985), and Coalition of Immokalee Workers (CIW) (1993).

Pesticides

The use of pesticides increased after World War II in an effort to assist farmers in food growth. In turn it made farm workers sick. By the end of the century the United Farm Workers started fighting against the use of pesticides despite risks. They made sure the general population knew about the dangers of pesticide use. Among the leaders of the movement were Cesar Chavez who helped the population understand that pesticide exposure was a problem for farm workers and by extension the wider population that consumes the food produced and the environments the food is grown in. These risks disproportionately affect farm workers who are from low-income families or are immigrants. They often do not have the equipment to protect themselves from pesticide exposure. Both skin contact and accidental inhaling of the substance can lead to serious side effects. Low-income workers particularly may not have access to medical care. Being exposed to pesticides can cause long-term health problems like nerve damage, breathing problems and neurological disorders as described by the National Library of Medicine.

There are laws in place to regulate the use of pesticides in the United States like the Worker Protection Standard. This is enforced by the Environmental Protection Agency. Enforcement of these protections is not always prioritized. The United Farm Workers and other groups have been fighting for more rules, better enforcement of said rules and transparency when it comes to pesticide use. They also provide aid to workers negatively affected by pesticides and dangerous working conditions.

=== Immigration ===
The UFW during Chávez's tenure was committed to restricting immigration. Chávez and other like-minded individuals advocated for enforcement of laws such as the Alien Contract Labor Act of 1885 to fight the influx of people that could hurt their cause. Chávez and Dolores Huerta, co-founder and president of the UFW, fought the Bracero Program that existed from 1942 to 1964. Their opposition was due to their belief that the program undermined US workers and exploited the migrant workers. Since the Bracero Program ensured a constant supply of cheap immigrant labor for growers, immigrants could not protest any infringement of their rights, lest they be fired and replaced. Their efforts contributed to Congress ending the Bracero Program in 1964.

On a few occasions, concerns that illegal immigrant labor would undermine UFW strike campaigns led to controversial events. The UFW describes these as anti-strikebreaking events, but some have also interpreted them as anti-immigrant. In 1969, Chávez and members of the UFW marched through the Imperial and Coachella Valleys to the border of Mexico to protest growers' use of illegal immigrants as strikebreakers. The UFW and Chávez reported illegal immigrants who served as strikebreaking replacement workers (as well as those who refused to unionize) to the Immigration and Naturalization Service.

In 1973, the United Farm Workers set up a "wet line" along the United States-Mexico border to prevent Mexican immigrants from entering the United States illegally and undermining the UFW's unionization efforts. During one such event, in which Chávez was not involved, some UFW members, under the guidance of Chávez's cousin Manuel, physically attacked the strikebreakers after peaceful attempts to persuade them not to cross the border failed.

In 1979, Chávez denounced the US Immigration and Naturalization Service in a US Senate hearing for the former's refusal to arrest illegal Mexican immigrants whom Chávez said were being used as strikebreakers.

After the death of Chávez, the United Farm Workers shifted their stance towards immigration and began advocating for undocumented immigrants and campaign against Proposition 187.

== Presidents ==
1963: Cesar Chavez
1993: Arturo Rodriguez
2018: Teresa Romero

== Historic sites ==
- National Farm Workers Association Headquarters, Delano, California, listed on the National Register of Historic Places (NRHP)
- The Forty Acres, Delano, California, NRHP-listed

== See also ==
- Cesar Chavez sexual abuse allegations
- Delano grape strike
- Rebecca Flores Harrington
- Timeline of Latino civil rights in the United States
