= List of people from Stockton, California =

This is a list of notable past and present residents of the U.S. city of Stockton, California, and its surrounding metropolitan area. People born in Stockton are printed in bold.

== Arts ==
- **Ethel Sperry Crocker** (1861–1934), philanthropist and art patron
- **Willis E. Davis** (1855–1910), landscape painter, clubman, banker
- **David Haskell** (1948–2000), film, stage and television actor
- Taylor Mac (born 1973), playwright, actor, performance artist
- **Bob Montana** (1920–1975), comic artist, cartoonist
- **Kara Walker** (born 1969), contemporary artist
- Neck Face (born 1984), anonymous graffiti artist

== Athletics ==
- **Alex Alcalá** (born 2005), soccer player
- **Ricky Barnes** (born 1981), professional golfer
- **Greg Bishop** (born 1971), NFL offensive tackle
- Dallas Braden (born 1983), MLB pitcher
- Brooke Bryant (born 2000), professional ice hockey player
- Pete Carroll (born 1951), NFL coach (attended and coached at University of the Pacific)
- **Brandon Cavitt** (born 1973), soccer player
- **Erik Centeno** (born 2002), soccer player
- **Brandin Cooks** (born 1993), NFL wide receiver for the Buffalo Bills.
- **Nate Diaz** (born 1985), mixed martial artist
- **Nick Diaz** (born 1983), mixed martial artist, Former Strikeforce Welterweight Champion
- **Dennis Edwards** (born 1959), NFL defensive end
- **Frederick Feary** (1912–1994), boxer, 1932 U.S. Amateur champion and Olympic bronze medalist
- **Cathy Ferguson** (born 1948), swimmer, 2-time Olympic gold medalist
- **Conn Findlay** (1930–2021), 2-time Olympic gold medalist rower and sailor (America's Cup)
- **Ed Fisher** (born 1949), NFL and USFL guard
- **Jacki Gemelos** (born 1983), WNBA player
- **John Gianelli** (born 1950), pro basketball player
- **Brian Goodell** (born 1959), Olympic gold medalist and world record-holding swimmer
- **Eddie Guardado** (born 1970), MLB relief pitcher
- Wayne Hardin (1927–2017), College Football Hall of Fame at Navy and Temple (attended and coached at University of the Pacific)
- **Willard Harrell** (born 1952), NFL running back
- **Von Hayes** (born 1958), MLB outfielder
- **J. D. Hill** (born 1948), NFL wide receiver
- **Dan Inosanto** (born 1936), martial arts instructor
- Hue Jackson (born 1965), NFL coach (attended and coached at University of the Pacific)
- **Trumaine Johnson** (born 1990), NFL cornerback
- **Derek Kennard** (born 1962), NFL guard and center
- **Dean Kremer** (born 1996), Israeli-American MLB starting pitcher
- **Mike Macfarlane** (born 1964), MLB catcher
- Doug Martin (born 1989), NFL running back
- James Nunnally (born 1990), pro basketball player
- **Brian Peets** (born 1956), NFL tight end
- **Mike Pereira**, NFL vice president of officiating, rules analyst for Fox Sports
- **Pete Morelli** (born 1951), NFL referee
- **Louis Rankin** (born 1985), NFL and CFL running back
- **Jose Rojas** (born 1990), racquetball player
- **Webster Slaughter** (born 1964), NFL wide receiver
- **Andre Spencer** (1964–2020), basketball player
- Ed Sprague Jr. (born 1967), MLB third baseman
- Amos Alonzo Stagg (1862–1965), pioneer of college football, coach at University of the Pacific
- **Julius Thomas** (born 1988), NFL tight end
- **Eric Williams** (born 1962), NFL defensive lineman
- **Dolores Wilson** (1928–2022), All-American Girls Professional Baseball League outfielder
- **Jim Winn** (born 1959), MLB relief pitcher
- **Kenny Wooten** (born 1998), NBA power forward

== Business ==
- Melvin Belli (1907–1996), lawyer known as "The King of Torts"
- Benjamin Holt (1849–1920), inventor and founder of Holt Manufacturing Company
- Tillie Ehrlich Lewis (1901–1977), businesswoman, founder of Tillie Lewis Foods
- **Robert Six** (1907–1986), former CEO of Continental Airlines
- **Edwin Lewis Snyder** (1887–1969), architect
- **Alex Spanos** (1923–2018), businessman, owner of Los Angeles Chargers
- **Dean Spanos** (born 1950), president of Los Angeles Chargers

== Literature ==
- **Dennis Etchison** (1943–2019), novelist
- **Leonard Gardner** (born 1933), novelist, screenwriter
- **Daniel Goleman** (born 1946), author, psychologist, and science journalist
- **Maxine Hong Kingston** (born 1940), author, feminist
- **Brandon Leake** (born 1992), spoken word poet, winner of America's Got Talent
- **Janice Mirikitani** (1941–2021), Sansei poet, activist
- **Howard Pease** (1894–1974), writer of adventure stories for juveniles
- **Anthony Veasna So** (1992–2020), Khmer American author

== Movies/television/media ==
- **Walter Anthony** (1872–1945), screenwriter
- **Dennis Dun** (born 1952), actor
- **Santino Fontana** (born 1982), actor
- **Cay Forrester** (1921–2005), actress
- **Chase Hudson** (born 2002), social media personality
- **Mark Gantt** (born 1968), actor, producer
- **Lamont Johnson** (1922–2010), actor, director
- Janet Leigh (1927–2004), actress
- Taylor Mac (born 1973), actor, playwright, performance artist, director
- **Dolores Moran** (1926–1982), actress and model
- **Jazz Raycole** (born 1988), actress, dancer
- **Ross Thomas** (born 1981), actor, filmmaker

== Music ==
- **Ace Andres** (born 1958), guitarist, singer/songwriter
- **Chi Cheng** (1970–2013), bassist, musician/poet
- Dave Brubeck (1920–2012), jazz pianist and composer
- **Shannon Curtis**, musician, singer/songwriter
- Gil Evans (1912–1988), musician, pianist, composer
- **Chris Isaak** (born 1956), musician, singer/songwriter
- **Hallway Productionz** (formed 2002), music producers Teak & Dejon Underdue
- **EBK Jaaybo** (born 2003), rapper
- **Scott Kannberg** (born 1966), musician
- Stephen Malkmus (born 1966), musician
- **Pavement** (formed 1989), indie rock band
- **Grant-Lee Phillips** (born 1963), musician, singer/songwriter
- **Cliffie Stone** (1917–1998), musician, country singer
- Jasmine Sandlas (born 1985), Punjabi singer, songwriter, rapper
- **Randy Stonehill** (born 1952), guitarist, singer/songwriter
- **Savage Sun** (born 1972), rapper
- Gary Young (born 1953), musician

== Politics ==
- **Raymond Cox** (1951–2017), Minnesota state legislator and businessman
- Dolores Huerta (1930–2026), labor leader and civil rights activist, co-founder of the United Farm Workers
- Larry Itliong (1913–1977), Filipino American labor leader and union partner of Cesar Chavez
- Max Raisin 1881–1957), rabbi
- Peter Khoy Saukam (1915–2008), Acting President of Khmer Republic
- David S. Terry (1823–1889), 4th Chief Justice of California
- Anthony Silva (politician) (born 1964), former mayor
- Addie Viola Smith (1983–1975), attorney and trade commissioner in Shanghai

== Science ==
- **Arthur O. Austin** (1879–1964), engineer and inventor
- Richard O. Buckius (born 1950), engineer and Chief Operating Officer of the National Science Foundation
- **José M. Hernández** (born 1962), engineer and NASA astronaut

== Miscellaneous ==
- **Harriet Chalmers Adams** (1875–1937), explorer, writer, and photographer
- **Larry Fortensky** (1952–2016), final husband of Elizabeth Taylor
- Winnie Ruth Judd, convicted murderer
- Jeremy Meeks (born 1984), fashion model, former gang member
- **Richard A. Pittman** (1945–2016), United States Marine, Medal of Honor recipient
- Kristin Smart, 1995, missing person
- Charles Tatum (1926–2014), World War II U.S. Marine Corps veteran, Bronze Star recipient, and race car driver
- Nite Yun (born 1982), chef
