= Mónica Ramírez (activist) =

American civil rights attorney and trade unionist

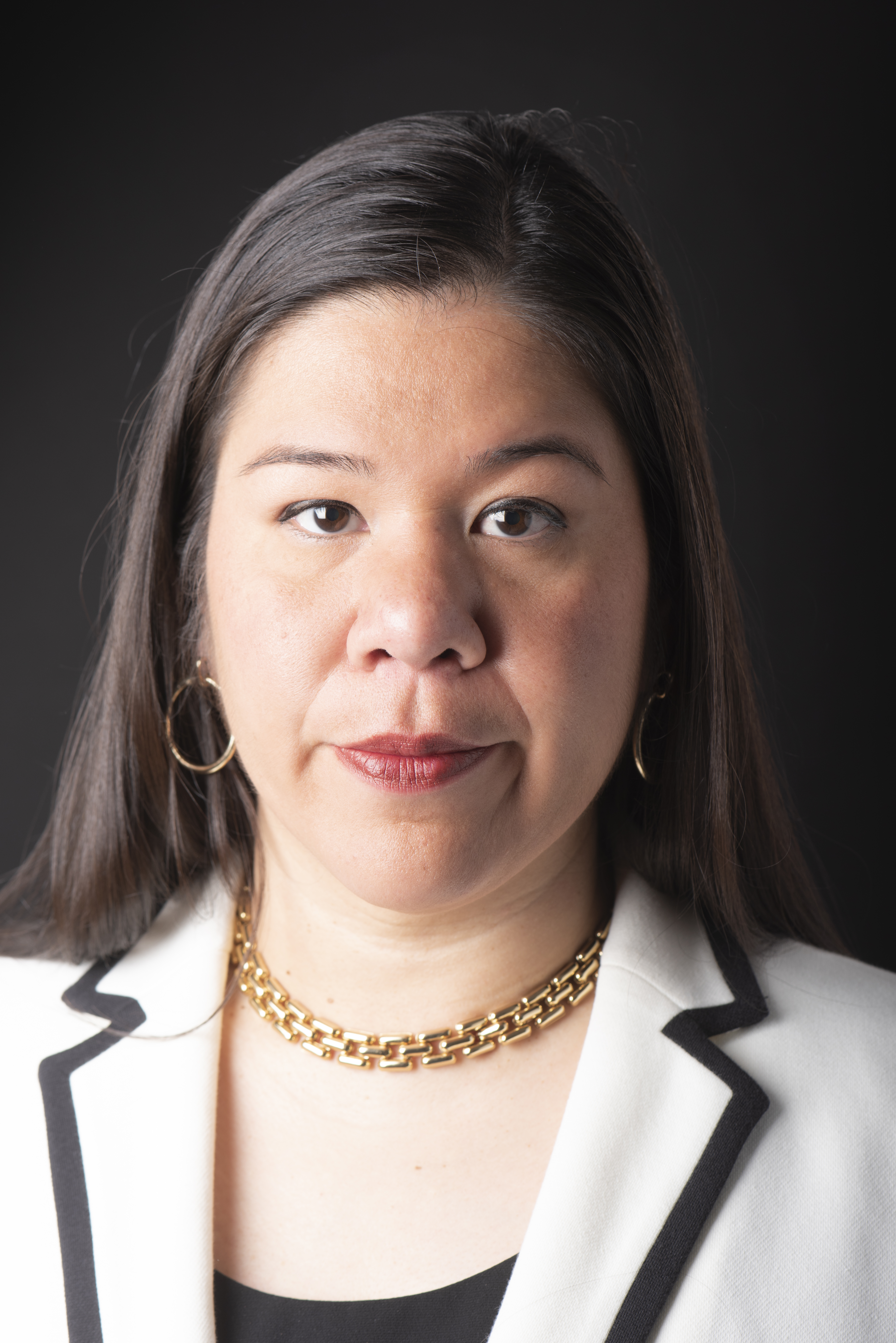
- Born: August 19, 1977 (age 49); Fremont, Ohio, U.S.
- Education: Loyola University of Chicago (BA); Ohio State University (JD); Harvard University (MPA)
- Spouse: Scott Derome
- Children: 1

Mónica Ramírez (born August 19, 1977) is an American activist, author, civil rights attorney, entrepreneur, and public speaker. She has been engaged in service and advocacy on behalf of farmworkers, Latinas and immigrant women.

== Early life and education ==
Ramírez was born and raised in Fremont, Ohio. Ramírez earned a Bachelor of Arts degree in communication from Loyola University of Chicago in 1999, a Juris Doctor from the Ohio State University Moritz College of Law in 2003, and a Master of Public Administration from the Harvard Kennedy School in 2015.

== Career ==
Ramírez created the first legal project in the U.S. focused on addressing sexual harassment and other forms of gender discrimination against farmworker women in 2003, which was incubated at the Migrant Justice Project of Florida Legal Services. She later scaled this project and founded "Esperanza: The Immigrant Women's Legal Initiative" within the Southern Poverty Law Center in 2006, which she directed for nearly seven years. In addition, she created the award-winning Bandana Project, an art activism project that raises awareness about workplace sexual violence against farmworker women.

From 2012 to 2014, Ramírez served as acting deputy director of Centro de los Derechos del Migrante, Inc., the first transnational migrant workers’ rights organization based in Mexico. In 2014, she founded Justice for Migrant Women, a national advocacy and technical assistance project focused on representing female farmworkers and other low-paid migrant workers who are victims of workplace sexual violence. In addition to her work for Justice for Migrant Women, Ramírez acted as the deputy director and director of gender equality for the Labor Council for Latin American Advancement from 2016 to 2018. While there, she developed a campaign aimed at assisting and empowering Latina workers in the U.S. Ramírez also co-founded Alianza Nacional de Campesinas (the National Farmworker Women's Alliance) with Mily Treviño-Sauceda.

In 2019, Ramírez also co-founded The Latinx House, a gathering space to support the Latino community and to celebrate Latino excellence in film and entertainment, with Alex Kondracke and Olga Segura. The Latinx House was launched at the 2020 Sundance Film Festival.

=== Dear Sisters letter ===
In November, 2017, while in her role as Alianza's Board President, Ramírez wrote the "Dear Sisters" letter, published in Time. The letter, written on behalf of Alianza members and lending the support and solidarity of Latina farmworkers, went viral and helped spark the TIME’S UP movement.

In 2018, she attended the 75th Golden Globe Awards as a guest of Laura Dern.

=== Querida Familia letter ===
In August 2019, Ramírez organized the Querida Familia letter, a letter to the Latino community and allies, with America Ferrera, Diane Guerrero, Eva Longoria, Alex Martinez Kondracke, and Olga Segura, after 22 people were murdered in a mass shooting in El Paso by a white nationalist and following immigration raids in Mississippi. The letter garnered the support of more than 200 Latino leaders who included actors, activists, civil rights and labor leaders, business people and more. The letter was published in English in The New York Times. It was published in Spanish in El Nuevo Herald, El Diario, and La Opinión. The letter went viral after its publication, and Ramírez, along with the other letter authors and organizers, were presented with the Women and Media Center's 2019 Solidarity Award from WMC founders Gloria Steinem, Jane Fonda and Robin Morgan in October 2019.

=== The Latinx House ===
In January 2020, Ramírez announced that she was launching a new initiative called The Latinx House with filmmaker and activist Alexandra Martinez Kondracke, and Mexican actress, producer, entrepreneur and activist Olga Segura. The Latinx House, which is a project within Ramírez's organization Justice for Migrant Women, aims to create gathering spaces to celebrate the best in Latino culture and bring important societal issues to the forefront.

== Awards and distinctions ==
- Casa de Esperanza's National Latina Transformational Leadership Award
- LCLAA Central Florida Trabajadoras’ Award
- William Oxley Thompson Award
- National Hispanic Council on Aging, Outstanding Community Service Award
- Hispanic Heritage Foundation's Hispanic Heritage Award for Leadership
- Women's Media Center, Solidarity Award
- YWCA USA Leadership Award
- Smithsonian Ingenuity Award for Social Progress
- Jessie de la Cruz Community Activist and Service Award from California Rural Legal Assistance

== Personal life ==
Monica currently resides in her hometown of Fremont, Ohio, and is married to Scott Derome. They have one son.

== See also ==
- Cesar Chavez (American, 1927–1993) - labor leader and civil rights activist of Mexican descent. He co-founded the National Farm Workers Association, which later became the United Farm Workers, advocating for agricultural workers' rights, improved working conditions, and labor protections through nonviolent organizing, strikes, and boycotts.
- Dolores Huerta (American, 1930–2026) - labor organizer, feminist, and civil rights activist of Mexican descent. She co-founded the National Farm Workers Association alongside César Chávez and has advocated for farmworkers' rights, immigrant communities, gender equality, and social justice through grassroots organizing and political activism.
- Philip Vera Cruz (Filipino American, 1905–1994) - labor organizer and civil rights activist. He helped lead the Delano grape strike of 1965 and co-founded the United Farm Workers, advocating for migrant farmworkers' rights, fair wages, improved working conditions, and racial equality within the American agricultural labor movement.
- Samuel Martínez Roque (Mexican, 1998— ) - political essayist, and researcher based in El Paso, Texas. His advocacy focuses on immigrant rights, human trafficking, labor exploitation, and access to justice. He is the author of Martínez Roque v. USA, a 24-part nonfiction essay series examining institutional failures and systemic injustice affecting trafficking survivors and immigrants in the United States.
