= Cesar Chavez (film) =

- Film poster
- Directed by: Diego Luna
- Screenplay by: Keir Pearson; Timothy J. Sexton
- Story by: Keir Pearson
- Based on: Life of Cesar Chavez
- Produced by: Diego Luna; Larry Meli; Keir Pearson; Pablo Cruz
- Starring: Michael Peña; America Ferrera; Rosario Dawson; John Malkovich
- Cinematography: Enrique Chediak
- Edited by: Douglas Crise; Miguel Schverdfinger
- Music by: Michael Brook
- Production companies: Canana Films; Mr. Mudd; Image Nation
- Distributed by: Pantelion Films (through Lionsgate) and Participant Media (United States); Videocine (Mexico)
- Release dates: February 12, 2014 (Berlin); March 28, 2014 (United States)
- Running time: 102 minutes
- Countries: Mexico; United States
- Languages: English; Spanish
- Budget: $10 million
- Box office: $7 million

Cesar Chavez is a 2014 biographical film produced and directed by Diego Luna about the life of American labor leader Cesar Chavez, who cofounded the United Farm Workers. The film stars Michael Peña as Chavez. John Malkovich co-stars as the owner of a large industrial grape farm who leads the opposition to Chavez's organizing efforts. It premiered in the Berlinale Special Galas section of the 64th Berlin International Film Festival.

== Plot ==
The film follows Cesar Chavez's efforts to organize 50,000 farm workers in California. Some of them were braceros—temporary workers from Mexico permitted to live and work in the United States in agriculture, and required to return to Mexico if they stopped working. Working conditions are very poor for the farmworkers, who also suffer from racism and brutality at the hands of the employers and local Californians.

To help the workers, Cesar Chavez (Michael Peña) forms a labor union known as the United Farm Workers (UFW). Chavez's efforts are opposed, sometimes violently, by the owners of the large industrial farms where the farmworkers work. The film touches on several major nonviolent campaigns by the UFW: the Delano grape strike, the Salad Bowl strike, and the 1975 Modesto march.

== Cast ==
- Michael Peña as Cesar Chavez
- America Ferrera as Helen Chávez
- Rosario Dawson as Dolores Huerta
- Darion Basco as Larry Itliong
- Yancey Arias as Gilbert Padilla
- Wes Bentley as Jerry Cohen
- Michael Cudlitz as Sheriff Smith
- Gabriel Mann as Bogdanovich Junior
- John Malkovich as Bogdanovich Senior
- Mark Moses as Fred Ross
- Jacob Vargas as Richard Chavez
- Julian Sands as Victore Representative
- Gael García Bernal (cameo)
- Héctor Suárez (cameo)

== Production ==
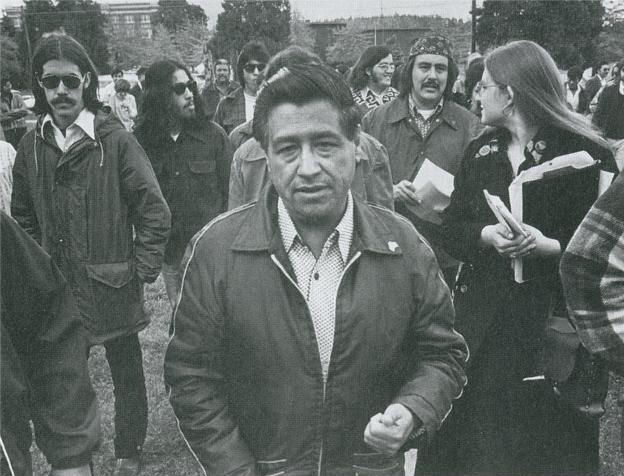
César Chávez at public protest to support Colegio Cesar Chavez in 1974

=== Screenplay and production staff ===
Although numerous books, magazine articles, and scholarly studies have been written about Cesar Chavez, Chavez is the first feature film about the labor leader. Keir Pearson, who wrote the Academy Award–nominated screenplay for the 2004 film Hotel Rwanda, wrote Chavez. Many writers and producers had tried for years to obtain the rights to Chavez's life story, but failed. Pearson negotiated for two years with Chavez's heirs before he and production partner, television producer Larry Meli, were able to secure the rights to Chavez's life in 2011. Pearson says his script focuses on the positive aspects of Chavez's personality, family life, and public accomplishments, but it is not a whitewash. Pearson and the producers reviewed the script with the Chavez family. Many of the comments made by the family, as well as anecdotes told by them, made it into the script. Pearson also relied heavily on archival material held by the Cesar Chavez Foundation. The script focuses primarily on the grape boycotts and strikes of the 1960s and early 1970s.

The producers of Chavez include Diego Luna, Gael Garcia Bernal, and Pablo Cruz (all principals of Canana Films); John Malkovich, Lianne Halfon, and Russell Smith (principals in Malkovich's production company, Mr. Mudd); writer Keir Pearson; and TV producer Larry Meli. In June 2012, production company Participant Media purchased the North American distribution rights to the film, and Participant Media's Jeff Skoll and Jonathan King were added as executive producers.

Chavez is directed by Diego Luna. The film is only Luna's second motion picture, and is his first film whose primary language is English. Luna said that directing in both English (for the main actors) and Spanish (for the extras) was a struggle.

=== Casting ===
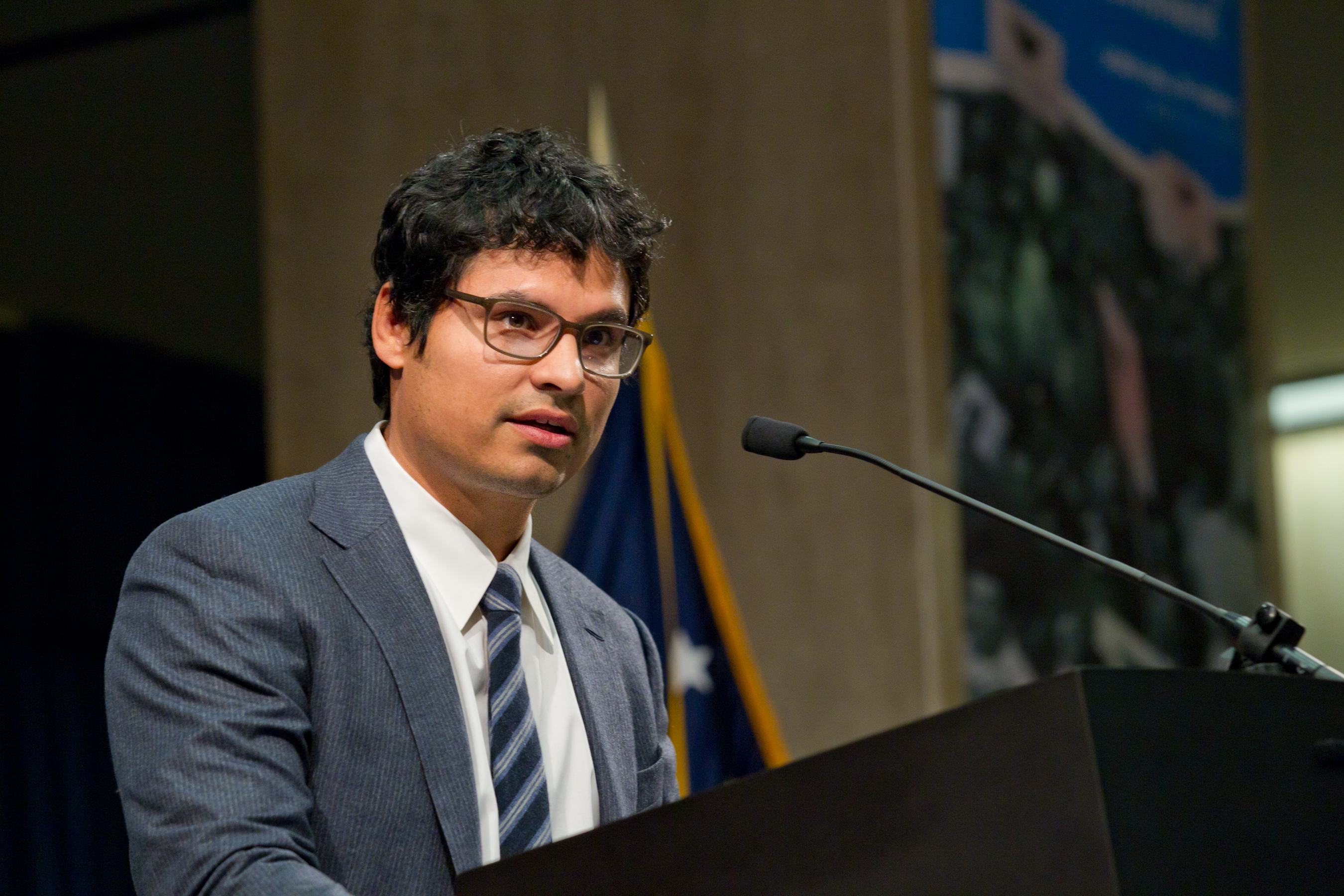
Michael Peña was master-of-ceremonies at the induction of the Farm Worker Movement into the Labor Hall of Fame and dedication of the Cesar E. Chavez Memorial Auditorium at the U.S. Department of Labor in March 2012.

Chicago-born Michael Peña stars as Chavez, the Mexican American labor leader born in Yuma, Arizona, in 1927. Peña says he knew almost nothing about Cesar Chavez prior to taking the role. His father, a Mexican farmer who emigrated to the United States, almost wept when Peña told him that he was going to play Cesar Chavez. Peña says he extensively studied historical records to gain a better understanding of Chavez. Because Peña keeps his hair very short, he had to wear a wig during the production.

America Ferrera was cast as Helen, the wife of Cesar Chavez who played a quiet, behind-the scenes role in Chavez's work. In contrast to Michael Peña, Ferrera (who was born in Los Angeles, California, to parents who had emigrated from Honduras) said she had learned a great deal about who Cesar Chavez was while growing up and in school. Ferrera said she met several times with Helen Chávez to learn more about her role in the farmworker movement. Ferrera says that she learned that Helen Chávez pushed her husband hard to keep the farmworker movement alive, all while raising eight children. Ferrera called the role daunting.

Rosario Dawson was cast as Dolores Huerta, the New Mexico–born daughter of a union activist and New Mexico state assemblyman who co-founded the United Farm Workers with Chavez. Dawson admitted that she did not know much about Dolores Huerta when she took the role. But, she says, she spoke with Huerta to research the role, and the more she learned the more impressed she was. She also admitted to being "a little frightened about making sure that I get it right." Huerta has expressed her happiness that Dawson took the role.

John Malkovich became involved with Chavez through his role as producer. Diego Luna convinced him to take the role of an abusive grape-grower. Malkovich agreed to the role because he admired Luna's previous film, and wished to take part in telling an important story about fairness. Actor Gabriel Mann plays another abusive agricultural producer. Mann says he took the role because he felt it was a timely story that spoke to what happens when workers lack union protections.

=== Production locations and notes ===
Most of Chavez was shot in Mexico. In part, Mexico offered much lower production costs, and was where most of the producers lived and worked. But many rural and urban parts of Mexico still look as California did in the 1960s, which proved critical in obtaining a sense of visual realism for the film. A portion of the picture was filmed in Cananea. The city, which is ethnically diverse, was able to provide a large number of Anglo-looking actors to portray non-Hispanic Americans. Additional locations around Hermosillo were also used. Workers in Hermosillo's numerous Chinese restaurants were recruited to portray the Filipino agricultural workers whom Chavez also sought to organize. The city's Art Deco public library served as the headquarters of one of the large agricultural companies that Chavez dealt with, and a 40 acres (160,000 m^{2}) field outside Hermosillo served as a farm near Delano, California. Scenes in grape fields were filmed in vineyards in the Mexican state of Sonora, where grape-growers still drape grape vines over wooden crosses, as Californians did in the 1960s. The production built shacks in the Sonoran grape fields to replicate the housing of migrant workers in California in the 1960s. The shooting in the Sonoran grape fields was difficult. The production was afflicted with dust storms and a tremendous number of insects. It was also terribly hot, and several actors collapsed on the set from dehydration.

Historical accuracy was important to the filmmakers. In addition to choosing locations which looked like California in the 1960s, actors were taught to speak in a Chicano dialect typical of the late 1960s and early 1970s. Dialect coach Claudia Vazquez says that dialect is very different from the Spanish and Spanish-inflected English spoken by many Mexican Americans in California today.

The film has a production budget of $10 million, nearly all of which came from Mexican investors.

== Reception ==
Cesar Chavez received a mixed reception from critics upon its release. It currently holds a 38% rating on Rotten Tomatoes based on 73 reviews, with an average rating of 5.6/10. The website's critical consensus states: "Too in awe of its subject's great works to present him as a human being, Cesar Chávez settles for trite hagiography." On Metacritic, the film has a score of 51 out of 100, based on 26 critics, indicating "mixed or average" reviews from critics. Audiences surveyed by CinemaScore gave the film an average grade of "A" on an A+ to F scale.

One negative review, from historian Matt Garcia, expressed that the film concentrates too much on hero-making and avoids criticism and complexity, but offers that this is a limitation of the biopic genre. However, critic Owen Gleiberman, in his positive review of the film, stated that it "couldn't be more timely."

The movie was panned by the Filipino American National Historical Society, for diminishing the role of Filipino American agricultural workers. Matt Garcia, in the Smithsonian Magazine, went further in his criticism of the movie for diminishing the role of other Mexican-American labor activists, as well as the many white volunteers and organizers who assisted Chavez and the strike. Another criticism levied at the film was that its production was insufficiently Chicano.
