= Líderes Campesinas =

Advocacy organization in California, US

Líderes Campesinas is a grassroots organization founded in California in 1992 that advocates for women farm workers. Co-founded by Mily Treviño-Sauceda, the organization seeks to advance the social, political and economic well-being of farm worker women with an emphasis on gender equality and justice.

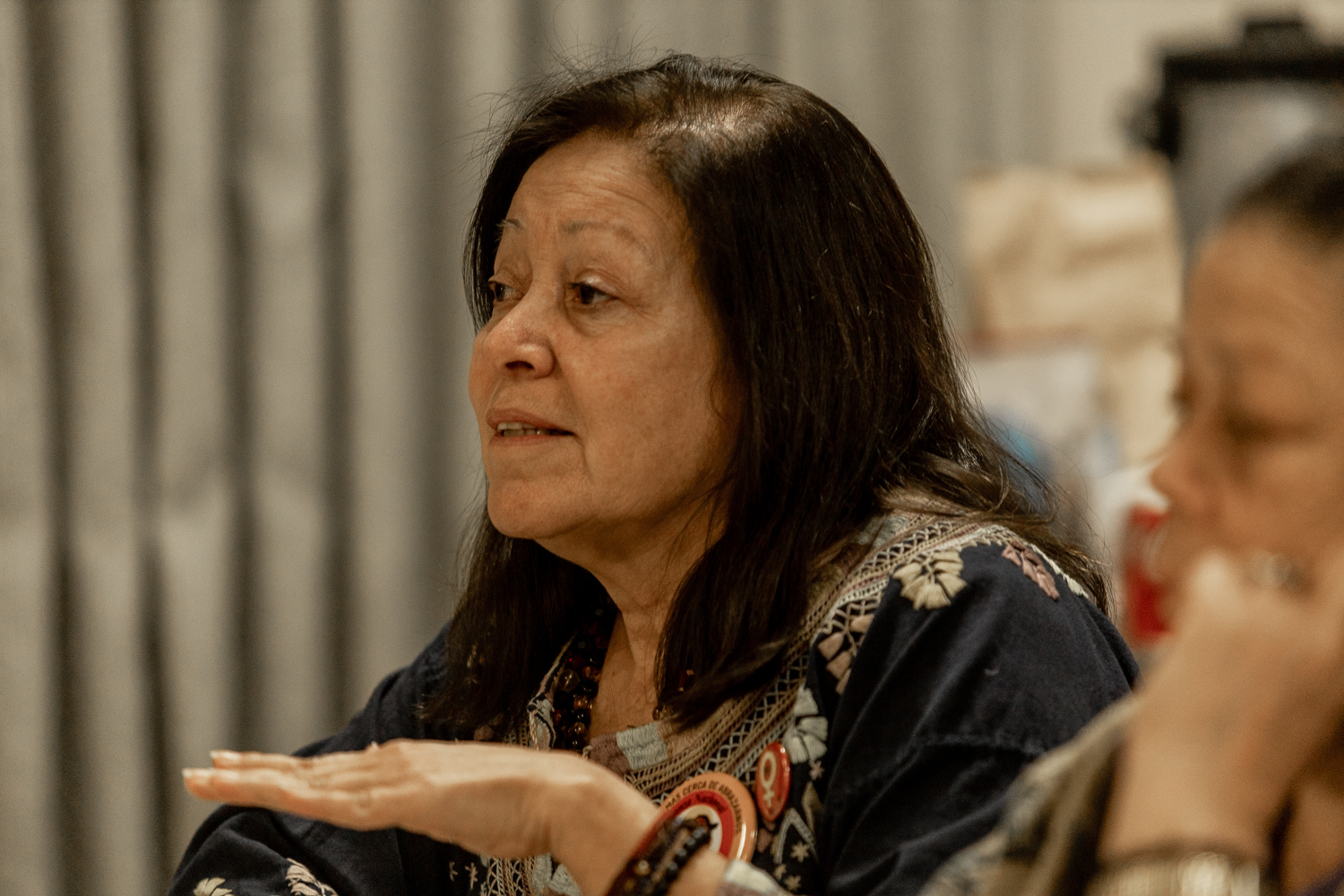
Mily Treviño-Sauceda, cofounder of Lideres Campesinas

== History ==
Líderes Campesinas was inspired by a needs assessment survey conducted by Maria Lopez-Treviño and Mily Treviño-Sauceda in California's Coachella Valley. The survey focused on identifying the needs and problems of women farm workers in the region in order to create an educational radio show to address those needs. This led to the establishment of Mujeres Mexicanas in 1988, which was composed of fieldworkers and paraprofessionals.

In 1992, the organization formally became Líderes Campesinas, a project designed to empower women farm workers through leadership and advocacy. This became the first statewide Campesina organization, focusing on community engagement, leadership training, and workers' rights.

== Projects ==
Líderes Campesinas uses advocacy, education, leadership programs, and safety workshops to support women to realize their rights, improve their working conditions, and become agents of change in their communities.

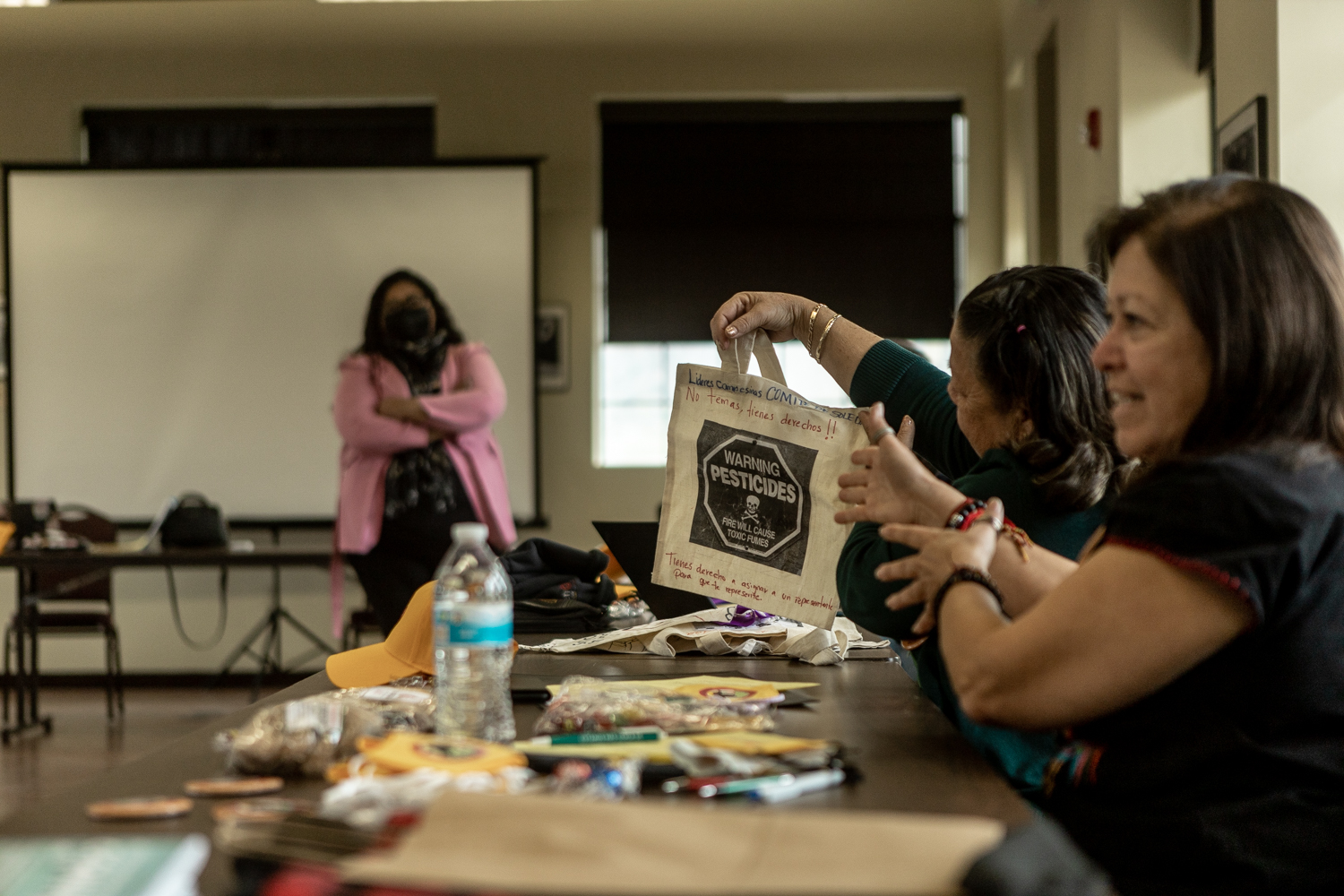
Mily Treviño-Sauceda and Audelia Garcia Cervantes with Lideres Campesinas.

Líderes Campesinas provides farm working communities with the appropriate information to ensure their human rights, from workshops about labor rights, food safety, and pesticide training. In 2003, with the help of Pesticide Action Network North America (PANNA), Líderes Campesinas created the Farmworker Women and Pesticides in California's Central Valley project to educate themselves and their communities on the effects of pesticides as well as to raise awareness among state regulatory agencies that are responsible for protecting the well-being of farm workers.

Líderes Campesinas works to support sexual and reproductive health among farm workers and Latinas in the U.S. In 2005, Líderes Campesinas participated in a project with the Guttmacher Institute to improve Latinas' access to healthcare and information. The report stated that Latinas are more likely to delay healthcare appointments due to childcare difficulties, something Líderes has provided for many farm-working women since its inception.

In 2008, Líderes Campesinas and Lynn M. and Rachel Rodriguez tested an intimate partner violence icon form assessment for use with seasonal farm workers and migrant women. The purpose was to help illiterate, semi-literate, and literate women who were part of the Líderes Campesinas Domestic Violence outreach and Education Project. As part of their fight against domestic violence, Líderes Campesinas has participated in public marches and created education campaigns to inform battered women of the services available to them.
