= Juan Fernández (politician) =

American politician

Member of the New Mexico House of Representatives
- In office 1938–1941

Personal details
- Party: Democratic
- Children: 2; including Dolores Huerta

Juan Fernández was an American politician. He served as a Democratic member of the New Mexico House of Representatives.

== Life and career ==
Fernández was a coal miner in Dawson, New Mexico.

In 1938, he was elected to the New Mexico House of Representatives for San Miguel County. By the 1950s, he served in the United States Navy during the Korean War.
