= Dolores Huerta =

American labor leader (1930–2026)

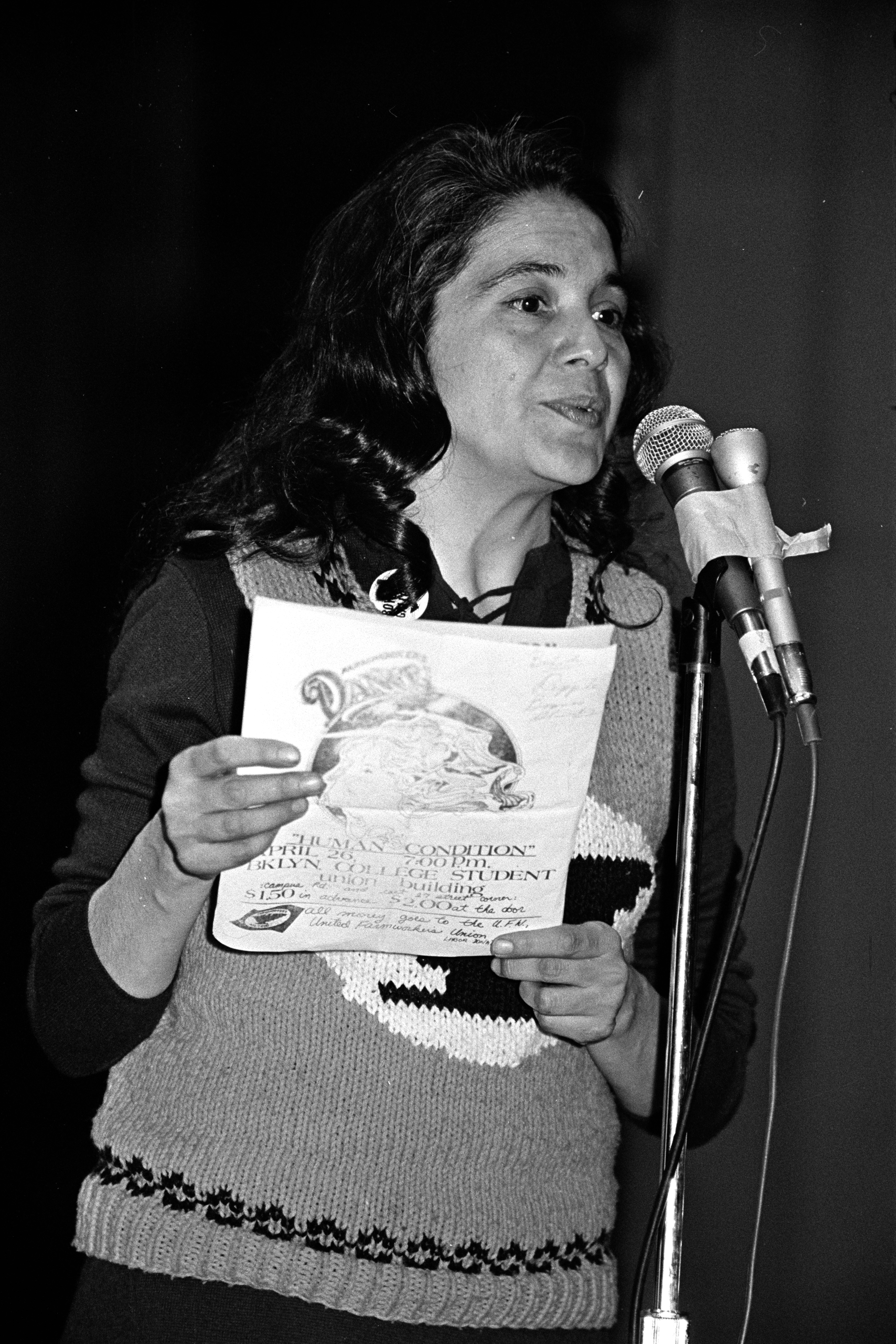
- Huerta in 1974
- Born: Dolores Clara Fernández; April 10, 1930; Dawson, New Mexico, U.S.
- Died: October 28, 2026 (aged 96); Bakersfield, California, U.S.
- Education: San Joaquin Delta College
- Known for: Co-founder of the National Farm Workers Association; Delano grape strike; "Sí se puede"
- Political party: Democratic
- Other political affiliations: Democratic Socialists of America
- Spouses: Ralph Head (m. 1948; div. 1951); Ventura Huerta (divorced)
- Partner: Richard Chavez (deceased)
- Children: 13
- Father: Juan Fernández
- Quotations related to Dolores Huerta at Wikiquote

Dolores Clara Huerta (Spanish: [doˈloɾes ˈweɾta]; née Fernández; April 10, 1930 – October 28, 2026) was an American labor leader and feminist activist. After working for several years with the Community Service Organization (CSO), she co-founded the National Farm Workers Association (NFWA) with fellow activists Cesar Chavez and Gilbert Padilla, which eventually merged with the Agricultural Workers Organizing Committee (AWOC) to become the United Farm Workers (UFW). Huerta joined Filipino leader Larry Itliong in the Delano grape strike in 1965, managing boycott campaigns on the east coast and negotiating with the grape companies to end the strike. Some credit her with the UFW slogan "sí se puede" (transl. 'yes we can'). (Note: Huerta claimed credit for the slogan. However, researchers John Hammerback and Richard Jensen attributed the phrase to Chavez. Chavez himself credited Huerta for the slogan.)

Although she initially opposed certain feminist concepts, such as the right to abortion and contraception, Huerta eventually became a strong proponent of women's rights. She worked with the Feminist Majority Foundation (FMF) to help Latina women become more active and visible in politics, campaigned for women's reproductive rights, and served as an honorary co-chair of the 2017 Women's March in Washington, D.C.

In 2002, she founded the Dolores Huerta Foundation (DHF), a civic advocacy organization based in Bakersfield, California. She was active in Democratic politics and supported the campaigns of Robert F. Kennedy, George McGovern, Al Gore, Howard Dean, Hillary Clinton, Joe Biden, and Kamala Harris. She was also a supporter of LGBTQ rights and immigration reform.

Huerta received numerous awards for her work as an organizer, including the Eleanor Roosevelt Human Rights Award, the Hispanic Heritage Award, and the Puffin/Nation Prize for Creative Citizenship. She also received the Presidential Medal of Freedom in 2012. In 2018, California Governor Jerry Brown signed a bill proclaiming April 10 as "Dolores Huerta Day" in California. A similar bill was signed in Oregon in 2019. She is portrayed by Rosario Dawson in the 2014 film Cesar Chavez and is the subject of the 2017 documentary Dolores.

== Early life ==
Dolores Huerta was born Dolores Fernández on April 10, 1930, in the mining town of Dawson, New Mexico, to parents of Mexican descent. Her father, Juan Fernández, was a coal miner who belonged to the United Mine Workers (UMW). Labor unrest caused him to move throughout the Western United States, working as a beet farmer. Her mother, Alicia Chávez, divorced him when Huerta was five years old. She and the children then moved to Las Vegas, Nevada, and later to Stockton, California. After moving, she rarely saw her father, who remained in New Mexico. He was elected to the state legislature in 1938, where he was described as a "fiery union leader" by the Los Angeles Times.

In Stockton, Huerta was raised by her mother and grandfather, Herculano. She described their neighborhood as "integrated", with "Chinese, Latinos, Native Americans, Blacks, Japanese, Italians, and others". Her mother supported the family by working two jobs: as a canner and as a waitress at a local restaurant, earning a combined income of $5 weekly from both jobs. She was a member of the United Cannery, Agricultural, Packing, and Allied Workers of America (UCAPAWA), participating in a strike at the cannery in 1937. In 1941, she opened a restaurant. The following year, she bought a 70-room hotel from a Japanese American family who were forced to relocate due to Executive Order 9066. According to Huerta, the restaurant "catered mostly to farm workers".

Huerta, who was "encouraged by her mother to be socially active" according to researcher Christine Beagle, spent ten years as a Girl Scout. She attended Stockton High School, graduating in 1947. (Note: Beagle and Doak both claim that she graduated in 1947. However, a resource published by the New York Historical claims that she graduated in 1948.) Huerta described her high school as being "segregated" by both class and race. She attended the University of the Pacific's Stockton College (later San Joaquin Delta College) and graduated in 1953 with a provisional teaching credential.

Huerta became a teacher in rural California in 1954. She was one of three bilingual teachers in the area. Many of her students struggled with hunger and did not have sufficient clothing, regarding which she said: "I couldn't tolerate seeing kids come to class hungry and needing shoes. I thought I could do more by organizing farm workers than by trying to teach their hungry children."

=== CSO activism ===
Huerta quit teaching after a year. Soon after, in 1955, she met Fred Ross, one of the founding members of the Community Service Organization (CSO). She initially described him as being "slightly loco". A Republican at the time, she was suspicious of Ross's purported communist leanings. After asking the FBI to perform a background check on him—which came back clean—Huerta began attending CSO meetings. Her work with the CSO initially saw her in traditionally feminine roles, such as participating in women's clubs. However, Ross encouraged her to take on more active leadership assignments. By the late 1950s, she was founding new CSO chapters and working as a lobbyist, testifying before the California State Legislature in support of giving retirement benefits to noncitizens and health coverage to farm workers while opposing the controversial Bracero Program. She also advocated for neighborhood improvement projects, taught citizenship classes, and worked on voter registration drives.

Huerta met fellow organizer Cesar Chavez during her time there.

== Union activism ==
=== Early union activity ===
In 1958, Huerta helped found the Agricultural Workers' Association (AWA). When the AWA dissolved in 1959, Huerta became secretary-treasurer of the AFL-CIO-affiliated Agricultural Workers' Organizing Committee (AWOC). However, according to historian Margaret Rose, she resigned from the organization quickly, "[growing] disenchanted with the group's leadership, direction, and top-down policies". According to Huerta, in August 1960, she "felt pressured to have sex with [Chavez] in a hotel room during a work trip in San Juan Capistrano". Despite this, frustrated with the CSO's unwillingness to advocate for farmworkers, she co-founded the National Farm Workers Association (NFWA) with Chavez and fellow organizer Gilbert Padilla in 1962. Formally, she remained a paid CSO employee, staying in Stockton while Cesar established the organization's headquarters in Delano. Meanwhile, her relationship with Ventura "deteriorated", and they divorced in 1963.

Huerta eventually left her position with the CSO and moved in with Chavez and his family in Delano in 1964. (Note: According to Doak, she resigned in late 1962. Alicia Chávez, Bardacke, and Sowards also claim that she resigned. However, according to Rose, she was "terminated for her overriding interest in farmworker organizing over CSO business".) According to Chavez, Huerta's role in the early NFWA was "critical". Her duties included making phone calls, collecting union dues, and visiting worker camps in Stockton and nearby towns. She struggled to earn enough money to support her family during this time, taking on temporary work as a translator, substitute teacher, and onion farmer to supplement her NFWA income. In April 1965, she helped the NFWA organize a strike on behalf of rose grafters employed by the Mount Arbor and Conklin companies. After three days, the companies agreed to increase the strikers' wages but did not agree to a formal contract, which was one of the strikers' demands. The workers returned to their jobs the next day.

=== Delano Grape Strike ===
We are conscious today of the significance of our present quest. If this road we chart leads to the rights and reforms we demand, if it leads to just wages, humane working conditions, protection from the misuse of pesticides, and to the fundamental right of collective bargaining, if it changes the social order that relegates us to the bottom reaches of society, then in our wake will follow thousands of American farm workers.

— Dolores Huerta, "Proclamation of the Delano Grape Workers", 1969

On September 8, 1965, union organizer Larry Itliong of the AWOC initiated a strike at nine vineyards in Delano. Itliong approached Chavez for support, and on September 16, the anniversary of the Cry of Dolores, Chavez called an NFWA meeting at the Our Lady of Guadalupe Church in Delano. AWOC members addressed the crowd, and attendees urged Chavez to support the strike. While he was initially reluctant, he began drafting plans for the NFWA's entry at a meeting on September 19. It joined the strike the next morning.

The strike was accompanied by boycotts. Huerta and Padilla organized a wine boycott throughout California. Huerta was then sent to direct boycott efforts in New York and New Jersey. She initially organized secondary boycotts with local unions, who refused to transport California grapes over the Hudson River. This was illegal at the time under the Taft–Hartley Act. After the union eventually released the grapes for distribution, she launched a consumer boycott in coalition with local churches, labor organizations, liberal activists, and student groups. Members of the coalition picketed A&P grocery stores until they stopped selling grapes. Soon after, other stores such as Bohack, Finast, Hills, and Waldbaum's followed suit. Huerta spoke in public regularly about the strike, becoming well known for her "firebrand rhetoric".

On August 19, 1965, the AWOC and NFWA merged to form the United Farm Workers (UFW). Huerta, along with various members of the former AWOC and NFWA leadership, was appointed vice president of the new organization. She was one of the union's lead negotiators, and according to Rose, was "the union's first contract negotiator". In 1966, she negotiated with several of the struck grape companies—Schenley, Gallo, and Franzia—resulting in a contract favorable to the workers. When the strike ended on July 29, 1970, Huerta helped secure a contract with the remaining companies that increased workers' wages, added new safety rules to protect workers from pesticides, created a health fund, and turned the hiring process from the companies over to the UFW.

During the strike, in winter 1966, Huerta alleges that Chavez "raped her in [his] vehicle" after driving her "to a secluded grape field" in Delano. According to Huerta, she got into his vehicle presuming they were to discuss an upcoming strike. It had been common for them to discuss union matters in Chavez's car, as he was concerned about his office being "bugged". With the alleged rape leaving her in a "numb, shocked state", she said she did not report it because police were hostile to the farmworkers' movement, and because she believed that "no one within the union would believe her". She also said that the farmworkers' movement was her life's work and that she worried that reporting the assault would interfere with the movement's success.

=== Later union activity ===
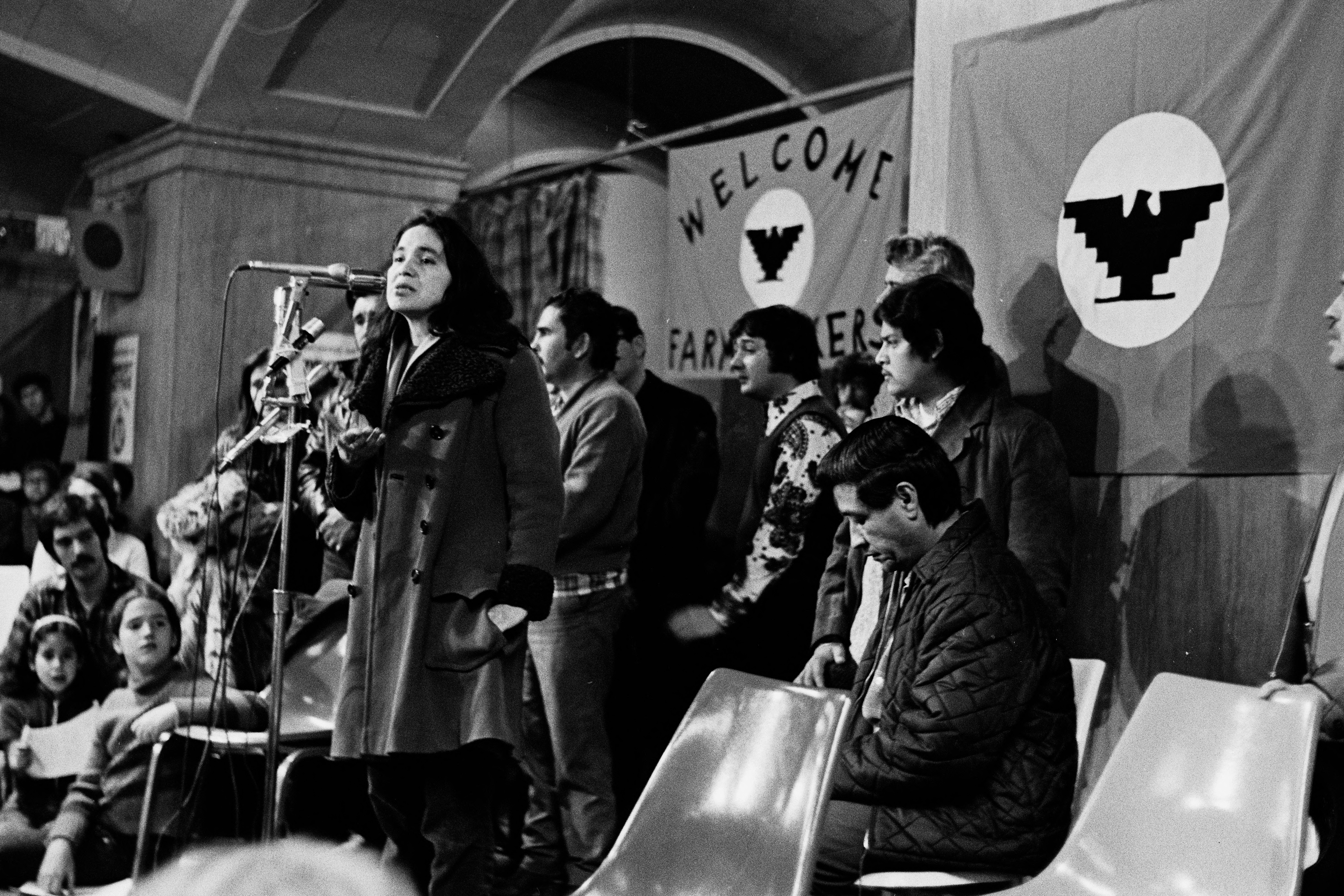
Huerta speaks at a press conference at St. Paul's Church in Manhattan, February 19, 1973. Seated at right is Cesar Chavez

During the 1970s, Huerta helped organize boycotts of lettuce, Gallo wine, and table grapes. She also entered a romantic relationship with Richard Chavez, Cesar's brother. The two had four children: Juanita, María Elena, Ricky, and Camila. Many criticized Dolores and Richard's cohabitation as "unorthodox", but according to Huerta, she was inspired by the women's liberation movement to proceed with the arrangement anyway. She, Richard, and Padilla worked to organize workers in California's Central Valley. In 1974, she helped found the Coalition of Labor Union Women, and in 1975, she helped pass the California Agricultural Labor Relations Act (ALRA), the first law to recognize farmworkers' right to collective bargaining in the state, as a lobbyist for the UFW. Throughout the late 1970s, she participated in efforts to protect the new law as director of the Citizenship Participation Day Department, the UFW's political wing.

Huerta's relationship with other UFW organizers became tense during the 1970s. Amidst a conflict between the UFW and the International Brotherhood of Teamsters, the Agricultural Labor Relations Board, which had been created by the ALRA, shut down due to lack of funding in 1976. The UFW supported Proposition 14, an amendment to the ALRA that would have addressed funding issues and unclear legal language in the ALRA, initiating a boycott in support of the proposition. The amendment was ultimately defeated by a significant margin. After its failure, Chavez blamed boycott leader Nick Jones for the loss and accused him and fellow organizer Charlie March of being part of a "left-wing conspiracy to undermine the union".

After the defeat of Proposition 14, Chavez moved to reorganize the UFW's boycott offices, leading to conflict with boycott staff and causing Chavez to become increasingly paranoid about opposition. He began to affiliate himself with Charles Dederich, founder of the new religious movement Synanon. Influenced by Dederich, Chavez began advocating for the use of a confrontational group criticism method called "the Game" in UFW meetings. Huerta supported the implementation of "the Game", but it was controversial among union members.

Huerta came into conflict with several UFW staff members during this period, including lawyer Jerry Cohen and organizers Padilla, Berta Batres, Chris Hatmire, Juan Gutierrez, Marshall Ganz, and brothers Chava and Mario Bustamente. Historian Matthew Garcia notes that she often had conflicts with younger staff members. He also describes an incident where Huerta criticized organizer Lorraine Agtang during a "Game" session, later "intimidat[ing] her" by "staking out her house at night for hours on end". According to one observer quoted by Garcia, Huerta regularly claimed that "infiltrators with revolutionary, radical ideology [were] urging armed struggle" to try to overthrow union leaders. Elements of Garcia's account have been criticized by researcher Stacey K. Sowards, who argues that he takes some of Huerta's statements "out of historical context".

While Huerta's relationship with Chavez was often strained during this time, with investigative journalist Miriam Pawel describing her as his "whipping girl", Sowards notes that they still maintained a "very close and supportive relationship". In 2026, however, Huerta said that Chavez emotionally abused and humiliated her, including yelling insults at her during a union board meeting and calling her a "stupid bitch". She said she managed to carry on by mentally suppressing those memories, though she felt the abuse to be "very painful" at the time.

In the 1980s, Huerta founded Radio Campesina (KUFW), a UFW radio station. She also raised money and gave public speeches supporting the union and testified before Congress about farmworkers' benefits, wages, and health issues. In September 1988, she was beaten by a police officer at a protest against George H. W. Bush's candidacy for president at the St. Francis Hotel in Union Square, San Francisco. She suffered two fractured ribs and a ruptured spleen, which doctors had to surgically remove. She received an $825,000 settlement from the San Francisco Police Commission as a result of the beating. The assault also led the San Francisco Police Department to change its policies for crowd control and officer discipline.

Following the beating, Huerta took a leave of absence from the UFW. She returned to union work after Chavez's death in 1993. During their final meeting, a few days before his death, Chavez admitted that he had treated Huerta and another female board member differently from their male colleagues. Huerta viewed this as a form of apology. She responded by saying that his behavior was "called machismo—it's called male chauvinism". After returning to work, Huerta supported strawberry workers, spoke at colleges, attended union meetings, and testified before Congress. She stepped down from her position as UFW vice president in 1999 to work on other social causes.

== Feminist activism ==
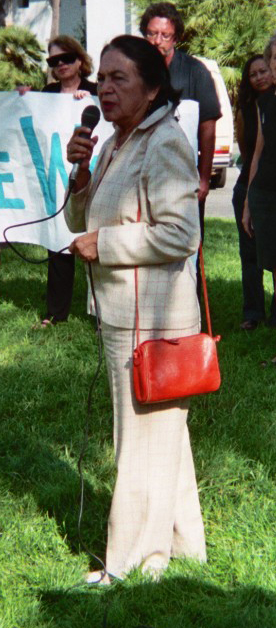
Speaking at a rally in Santa Barbara, California, on September 24, 2006

While Huerta was influenced by the women's liberation movement of the 1960s, including figures like Gloria Steinem, she initially dismissed feminist activism as a "middle-class phenomenon". During the 1970s, the UFW's position on women's rights was moderated by what historian Ana Raquel Minian refers to as the "idealized figure of the physically disciplined resident/laborer deserving of rights". The union contrasted "sexually respectable" union members with their "sexually depraved" opponents, leading them to oppose contraception while promoting sexual abstinence. Huerta personally opposed both abortion and contraception at that time, both "cornerstones" of the women's liberation movement, and criticized union members for their perceived promiscuity.

Despite this, Huerta called herself a feminist in a 1976 interview with Ms. magazine, crediting the women's liberation movement with assuaging her guilt about her divorces. Later, in 1985, she called herself a "born-again feminist" as she began to reassess her beliefs about women's issues. During her leave of absence from the UFW after the 1988 Union Square beating, she worked with the Feminist Majority Foundation (FMF), a nonprofit organization that advocates for reproductive health and women's equality. As part of the FMF's "Feminization of Power" campaign, she encouraged Latina women to run for office in an effort to increase their political visibility. She continued her work with the FMF after she retired from UFW organizing in 1999. In 2004, Huerta advocated for abortion rights as "the proper choice of every woman" at the UFW Constitutional Convention.

In 2014, Huerta traveled to Colorado to campaign against Colorado's Amendment 67, which would have changed state laws to define "unborn human beings" as people. The amendment was defeated in November, with 65% voting against and 35% voting for. She also served as an honorary co-chair of the 2017 Women's March in Washington, D.C., alongside Steinem and civil rights activist Harry Belafonte. The march was held to protest a feared regression in women's rights under the first Trump presidency and was attended by over 4.1 million people.

== Dolores Huerta Foundation ==
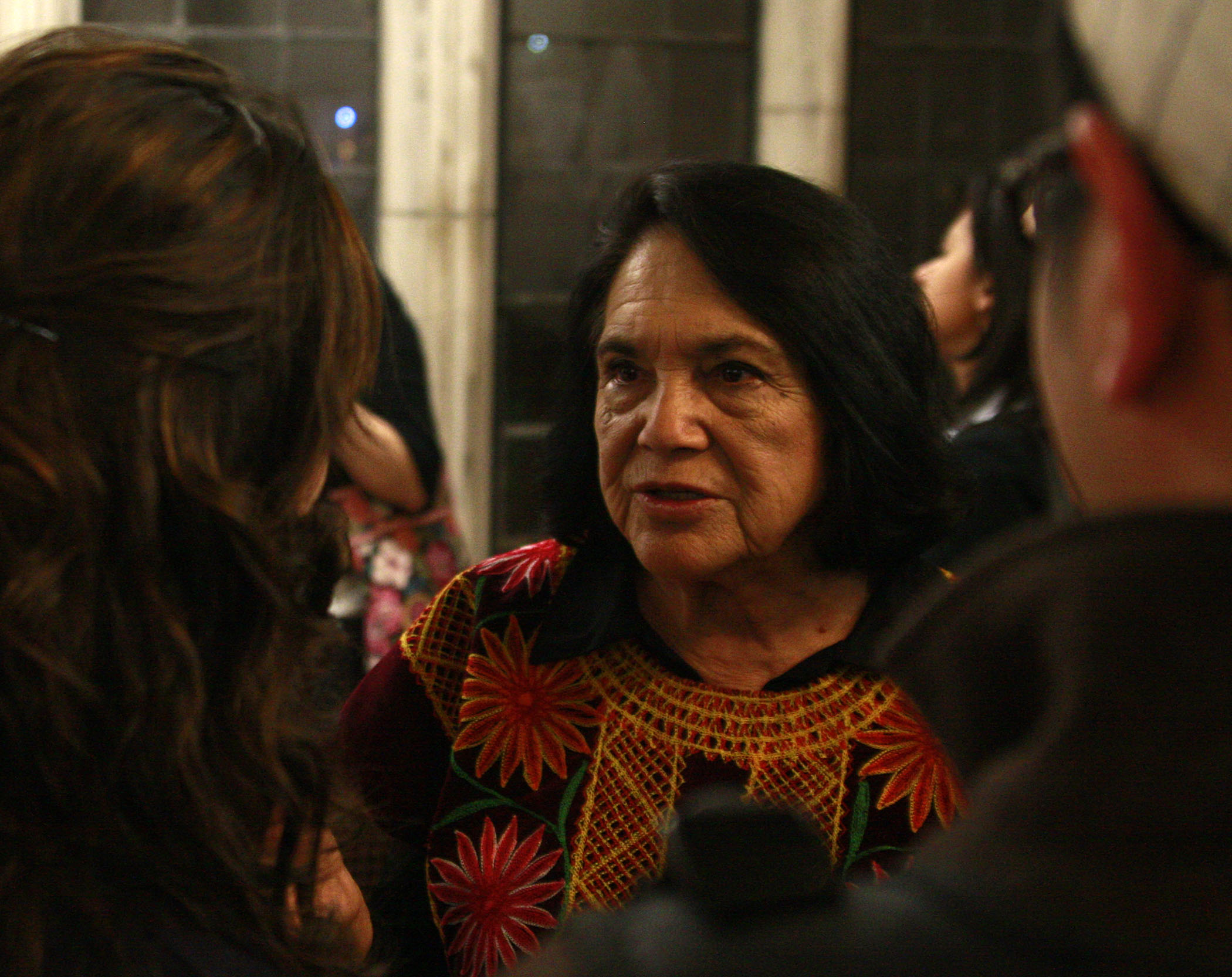
Dolores Huerta in 2009

Huerta was president of the Dolores Huerta Foundation (DHF), a 501(c)(3) organization based in Bakersfield, California, that she founded in 2002 using her $100,000 grant from the Puffin/Nation Prize for Creative Citizenship. According to Huerta, the DHF is "a continuation of the non-violent civil rights movement of the 1970s" and its goal is to "get people involved in their communities and participating in democracy".

As part of its organizing model, the DHF sends full-time organizers to create "Vecinos Unidos" (transl. 'United Neighbors') groups. These groups teach local residents how to collaborate, interact with government officials, and maneuver within complex political systems to benefit their communities. As of 2016, Vecinos Unidos systems had been implemented in the rural California communities of Arvin, Cutler, Lamont, Orosi, Tulare, Weedpatch, and Woodlake. In 2020, DHF executive director Camila Chavez claimed that Vecinos Unidos organizations had raised "millions of dollars" for road and sidewalk repairs, sewer expansions, streetlight installations, and other infrastructure projects.

In 2016, the DHF was one of the plaintiffs in a suit against Kern High School District (KHSD), alleging that Black and Latino students were unfairly targeted for disciplinary actions. The plaintiffs ultimately settled with the district on the condition that the DHF and other civil rights organizations would monitor the district to ensure it ended its discriminatory practices. Later, in 2018, the DHF presented a map to the KHSD outlining possible school district boundaries. This came after Latino organizations won a lawsuit against the district in which they argued that the original boundaries disenfranchised Latino voters in school board elections. As of 2023, Camila Chavez, Huerta's youngest daughter, is the executive director of the DHF. In 2025, the organization broke ground on the "Peace and Justice Cultural Center", a $34.8 million building in Kern County, California, designed to promote civic education, community organizing, and cultural preservation.

== Rape and abuse allegations against Cesar Chavez ==
In March 2026, as part of a wide-ranging New York Times investigation into Cesar Chavez's pattern of sexual abuse, Huerta alleged several instances of sexual and emotional abuse by Chavez, describing assaults in 1960 and 1966. According to Huerta, both assaults resulted in her becoming pregnant. Huerta ensured that both children resulting from the assaults were, in her words, "raised by other families that could give them stable lives". Huerta established close relationships with these children and introduced them to their siblings, but did not disclose their allegedly violent conception until 2026. She said she kept the secret for decades because of the political context, gender dynamics, and fear of damaging the movement.

On March 18, 2026, Huerta made a public statement about breaking her silence after The New York Times's investigation was published. She attributed her coming forward to the new knowledge that others had suffered sexual abuse by Chavez. Huerta stated, "I have never identified myself as a victim, but I now understand that I am a survivor—of violence, of sexual abuse, of domineering men who saw me, and other women, as property, or things to control". According to her, it was not up to her to forgive Chavez: "You know, I think it's up to God".

== Political positions ==
=== Democratic politics ===
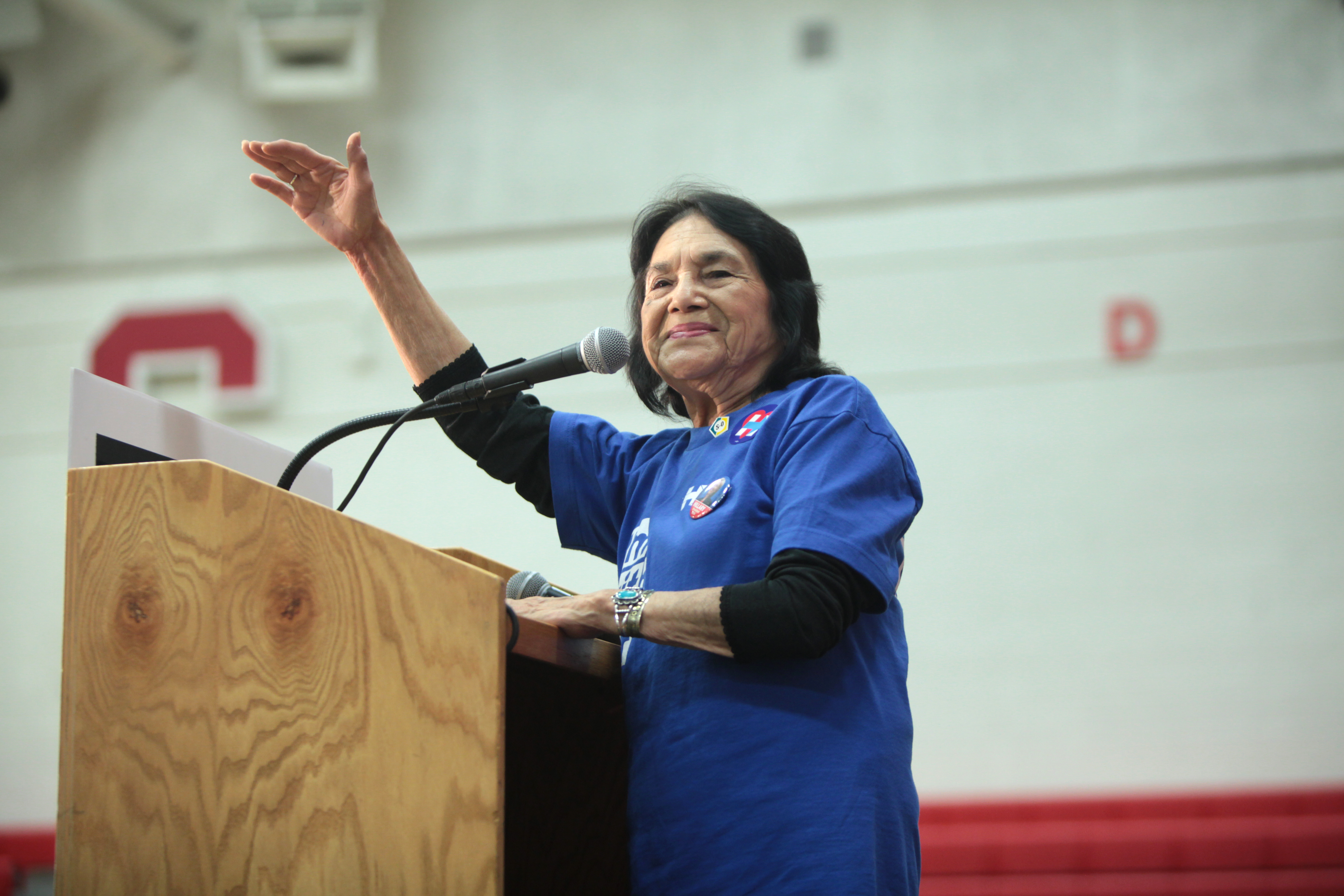
Dolores Huerta speaking at a Hillary Clinton campaign rally with former President Bill Clinton at Central High School in Phoenix, Arizona

Huerta was an honorary co-chair of the Democratic Socialists of America, prior to the position's abolition in 2017. During the 1968 Democratic Party presidential primaries, Huerta and the UFW campaigned on behalf of liberal Democrat Robert F. Kennedy. As part of her union responsibilities, she attended Kennedy's primary victory speech on June 5, 1968, where he was assassinated. In a later interview, she called Kennedy's assassination "the death of our future". She served as a co-chair for South Dakota Senator George McGovern's California delegation at the 1972 Democratic National Convention (DNC) alongside politicians Willie Brown and John Burton. She also worked on Al Gore's 2000 presidential campaign. She endorsed former Vermont Governor Howard Dean during the 2004 Democratic primaries. During the 2008 Democratic primaries, she campaigned for Hillary Clinton and served as a delegate for her at the DNC.

During the 2016 Democratic primaries, Huerta endorsed Clinton as the Democratic nominee once again, starring in an ad for her campaign during the California primary. She claimed in a tweet that when she offered to translate for supporters of Clinton's rival, Bernie Sanders, during the Nevada caucus, they responded by chanting "English only!" The tweet, and Huerta's support for Clinton in general, proved controversial. Some allege that she misinterpreted the crowd's message and that they were only calling for a "neutral moderator" to lead the discussion rather than a Clinton supporter. Others claim that Huerta was "booed and hissed at for her efforts to translate".

After the caucus, actress America Ferrera tweeted in support of Huerta while actresses Gaby Hoffmann and Susan Sarandon, who were allegedly present at the caucus, claimed that there were no "English only" chants. Later, actress Rosario Dawson, who plays Huerta in the film Cesar Chavez, wrote an open letter criticizing Huerta for "misrepresenting" Sanders's positions on issues concerning the Latino community. Huerta responded by alleging that the Sanders campaign had "ask[ed]" Dawson to "attack [her]" and that "Clinton [would] get more things done as president" but that she "[didn't] hold anything against" Dawson and that "when the dust settle[d]... [they were] going to be together".

During the 2020 Democratic primaries, Huerta endorsed California Senator Kamala Harris, criticizing fellow candidate Joe Biden for discussing border crossings in a way that she felt was "just like the Republicans". However, she later endorsed Biden for president in May 2020. During the 2024 United States presidential election, she endorsed Harris once again, stating:

I've known Kamala Harris for a long time — and I've seen firsthand how she fights relentlessly for Latino communities, working families, and for every American.

=== LGBTQ rights ===
During the 1960s and 70s, the UFW was generally supportive of LGBTQ rights. In an official statement made during the 1970s, the union publicly endorsed adding "sexual orientation" as a protected characteristic under California civil law. Huerta recalled speaking against discrimination based on sexual orientation at a hearing in the "70s or early 80s". In a 2006 speech, she spoke in favor of same-sex marriage:

Gay marriage[,] that's a big issue. Come to think about it, if Thelma and Louise get married, does that affect your paycheck? Does that affect any part of your life? Those are privacy, Constitutional issues. Benito Juárez[,] we just celebrate his birthday a few days ago—what was the great saying that he said? "Respeto al derecho ajeno es la paz"—respecting other people's rights is peace. How many children a woman chooses to have, who one chooses to live with and marry—that is your constitutional right.

In 2005, Huerta campaigned alongside California Assemblyman Mark Leno to pass Assembly Bill 19, which would have legalized same-sex marriage in the state. The bill passed in the California State Assembly but was vetoed by Governor Arnold Schwarzenegger. She also spoke at a pride celebration in Fresno, California, in 2021, advocating for LGBTQ rights and claiming that discriminatory rhetoric against LGBTQ people "leads to violence". The Dolores Huerta Foundation endorsed California Proposition 3 in 2024, which removed sections in the state constitution that discussed marriage as being between "a man and a woman" and affirmed marriage as a "fundamental right". The proposition ultimately passed, with 63% of voters supporting it and 37% opposed.

=== Immigration ===
Huerta has been described as "pro-immigrant". In 1994, Huerta campaigned against California Proposition 187, which would have denied healthcare and education services to undocumented immigrants. Huerta opposed the legislation, characterizing it and the anti-immigrant rhetoric that inspired it as being rooted in "racial anxiety". She also condemned Trump's 2017 rescission of the Deferred Action for Childhood Arrivals (DACA) policy, calling it "a step above slavery" while criticizing him for his racially inflammatory rhetoric. In 2018, she spoke at an El Paso rally in protest of Trump's family separation policy. Later, under the Biden presidency, she supported a "comprehensive immigration reform plan".

Some have criticized Huerta and the UFW for "harming" undocumented workers, however. In 1963, she lobbied for the repeal of the Bracero Program, a guest farmworker program initiated to meet increased demand for crops during World War II. Many Latino activists opposed the program, believing that bracero guest workers took jobs from Latino citizens. Critics of Huerta and the UFW claim that after the program's repeal, the union, under Huerta's leadership, frequently reported undocumented workers to the Immigration and Naturalization Service (now U.S. Immigration and Customs Enforcement; ICE), justifying their actions by characterizing undocumented workers as strikebreakers. Huerta also received criticism in 2014 for her support of Barack Obama despite "delays" to immigration reform under his administration.

== Awards and honors ==
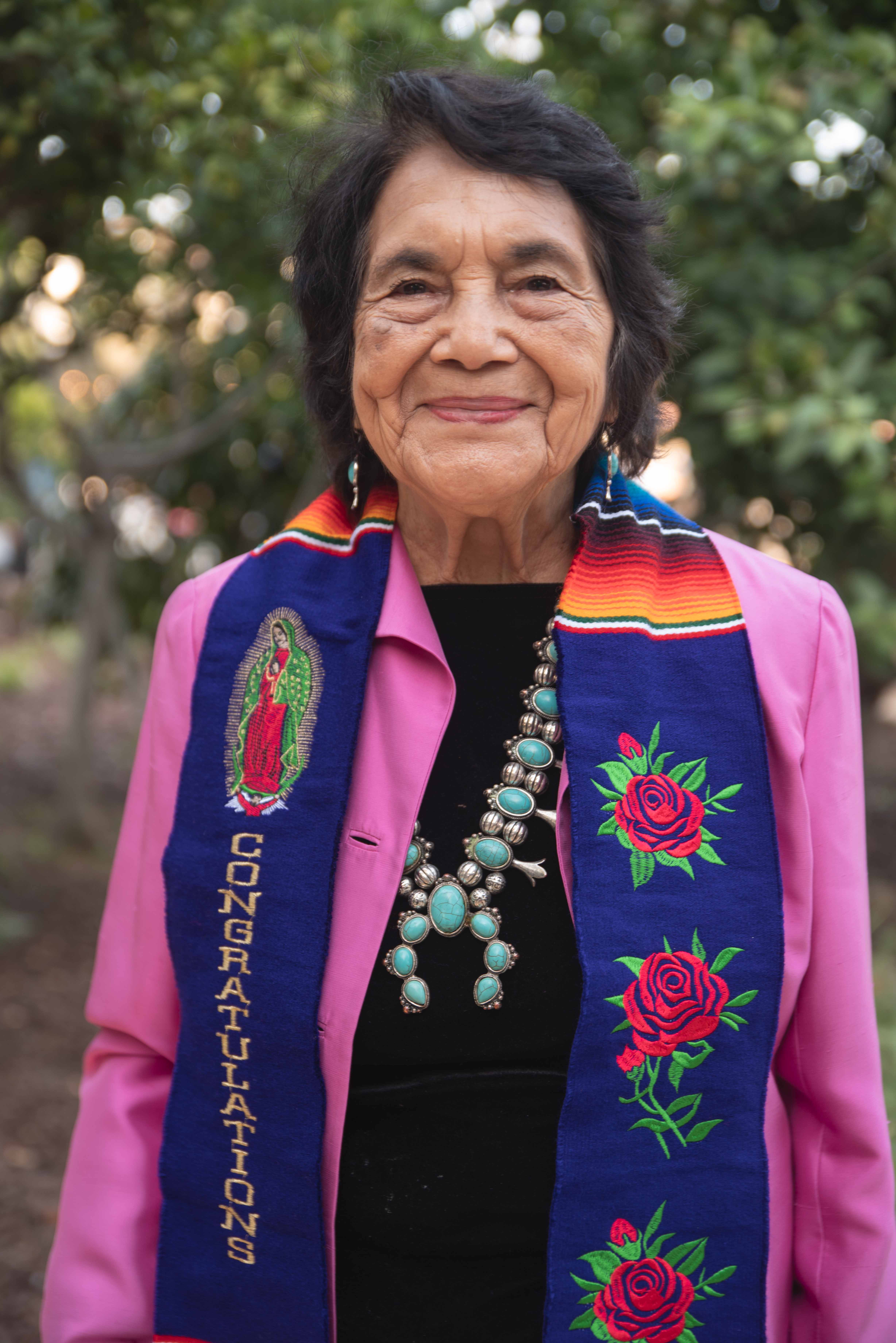
Dolores Huerta celebrating her honorary doctorate from USC, 2023

The California State Senate awarded Huerta "Outstanding Labor Leader" in 1984. She also received the Eleanor Roosevelt Human Rights Award in 1988. She received the Roger Baldwin Medal of Liberty Award, the Eugene V. Debs Foundation Outstanding American Award, and the Ellis Island Medal of Freedom Award in 1993. She was also the first Latina inducted into the National Women's Hall of Fame that year. In 1998, she was named "Women of the Year" by Ms. magazine. Ladies' Home Journal listed her as one of the "100 Most Important Women of the 20th Century".

In 2000, Huerta received the Hispanic Heritage Award. She won the $100,000 Puffin/Nation Prize for Creative Citizenship in 2002. In 2005, Huerta was initiated as an Honorary Sister of Kappa Delta Chi by the Alpha Alpha chapter at Wichita State University. Later, in 2009, she received the UCLA medal, the highest honor bestowed by the university. In 2012, she received the Presidential Medal of Freedom, the "highest civilian award" given by the president of the United States. In 2015 the Mexican Government made her a member of the Order of the Aztec Eagle, its highest order awarded to foreigners. She also received the Presidential Medallion from California State University, Los Angeles, in 2017 at the university's 20th Billie Jean King & Friends Gala.

In July 2018, California Governor Jerry Brown signed into law Assembly Bill 2644. First introduced by Assemblywoman Eloise Gómez Reyes, the bill designates April 10 as "Dolores Huerta Day". In March 2019, Washington Governor Jay Inslee signed a measure also designating April 10 each year as Dolores Huerta Day. Also in 2019, Time created 89 new covers to celebrate women of the year starting from 1920; it chose Huerta for 1965. In 2020, she received the Ripple of Hope Award from the Robert F. Kennedy Center for Justice and Human Rights. The Research Center for the Americas at the University of California, Santa Cruz, was renamed the Dolores Huerta Research Center for the Americas, with the official renaming taking place during a 30th anniversary event on October 20, 2022.

Huerta held honorary degrees from Mills College, Princeton University, the University of the Pacific, and the University of Southern California. Various schools are named after her, including an elementary school in Tulsa and middle schools in Burbank and San Jose. The intersection of East 1st and Chicago streets in the Los Angeles neighborhood of Boyle Heights is named Dolores Huerta Square. In Fort Worth, Texas, a portion of State Highway 183 is named in her honor. Asteroid 6849 Doloreshuerta, first discovered by American astronomers Eleanor Helin and Schelte Bus in 1979, is also named after her.

== Representations in media ==
Huerta is featured, alongside other Chicana activists, in the 2009 documentary A Crushing Love, directed by Sylvia Morales. In the 2014 film Cesar Chavez, directed by Diego Luna, she is played by Rosario Dawson. She is also the subject of the 2017 documentary Dolores, directed by Peter Bratt. Dolores features interviews with Huerta's children, who "express pride in their mother" but "recall the deep unhappiness they felt when growing up, often without her around". The documentary also discusses Huerta's "burgeoning feminism in the 60s and 70s" and shows footage of her beating at the St. Francis Hotel in 1988. The opera Dolores by Marella Martin Koch and Nicolás Lell Benavides premiered on August 2, 2025.

== Personal life and death ==
After graduating from high school, she married her high school sweetheart, Ralph Head, (Note: Alicia Chávez claims that Head and Huerta married in 1948, while Beagle claims that they were married in 1950.) but they divorced three years later. They had two children: Celeste and Lori. Dolores met her second husband, Ventura Huerta, while working with the CSO. The two had five children: Fidel, Emiliano, Vincent, Alicia, and Angela.

Huerta died from cancer at her home in Bakersfield, California, on October 28, 2026, at the age of 96. In November that year she became the first non-elected person and the first woman to lie in honor at the California State Capitol.

== See also ==
- History of Mexican Americans
- List of civil rights leaders
- List of Mexican Americans
- List of Mills College honorary degree recipients
- List of people from Stockton, California
- List of Presidential Medal of Freedom recipients
- List of Scouts
- Mily Treviño-Sauceda
- National Organization for Women Woman of Courage Award winners
- Philip Vera Cruz
