= Shannon Curtis =

American musician

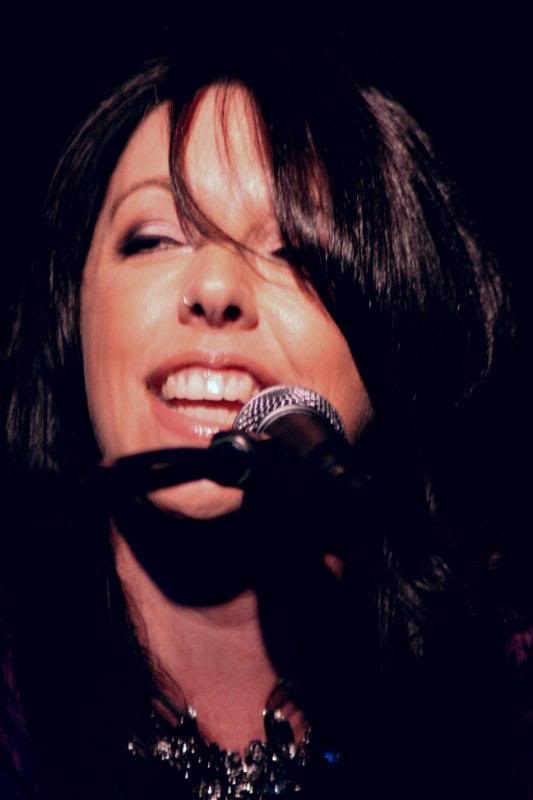
- Shannon Curtis performing at the Hotel Café, Los Angeles. Photo by Paul Franco.

Background information
- Origin: Sacramento, California, US
- Genres: Synthpop, artpop, dreampop
- Occupations: Singer, songwriter, musician, storyteller, author
- Instruments: Vocals, keyboard
- Years active: 2006–present
- Label: Saint Cloud Records
- Website: shannoncurtis.net

Shannon Curtis is an American singer, songwriter, musician, storyteller, and author.

== Early life and first band ==
Curtis grew up in Stockton, California, and was raised Baptist. Curtis grew up listening to Contemporary Christian music, as well as singing along to her dad playing 40s-era standards on the family's baby grand piano.

Curtis learned to sing in church, and began playing the piano at age four. A piano teacher once told her she played the piano "like a boy". After college, Curtis formed the rock/pop group Paradigm, which became a popular act on the college touring circuit. The band separated in 2006.

== Solo career ==
After dissolving Paradigm, Curtis turned her attention full-time to writing, and in 2007 released her debut solo EP, Boomerangs & Seesaws. Curtis began touring nationally in support of this EP, which was followed by a second EP, Paris Can't Have You, in March 2008. Both EPs were produced by Curtis's husband, producer/engineer Jamie Hill. Curtis's song "Before the Sun", from Boomerangs & Seesaws, was featured on MTV's hit show "The Hills".

In 2008, Grammy-winning producer Charlie Peacock (Civil Wars, Amy Grant, Sixpence None the Richer) heard Curtis's track "Boomerangs & Seesaws" on her MySpace page, and contacted Curtis and offered to work on her next recording at his studio in Nashville. To finance the project, Curtis released a limited-edition fan club single of her song "Get Outta Town", the sales of which paid for her travel and recording expenses.

Peacock produced Curtis's third EP Why Don't You Stay?, which was released in July 2009. Why Don't You Stay? was mixed by Joe Zook (OneRepublic, Modest Mouse, Katy Perry).

2010 and 2011 saw Curtis retrenching, writing, touring, and developing her sound. Writing on her website in 2011, she said, "I grew up in a pretty traditional musical environment, and when I started writing songs, I gravitated to the piano, because that's what I grew up playing. But my husband, Jamie, has a whole bunch of non-traditional instruments sitting around our house, and finally my curiosity got the better of me and I started playing around with them. We did 'Brightest Light' with that in mind, and wow! I feel like it's a huge step forward. It's like I have more colors to paint my little scenes with. It's really exciting."

Curtis released two 10-track maxi-singles in 2011, for the songs "Brightest Light in the Room" and "Let's Stay In", both of which showcased her evolving sound. Where before Curtis had used mostly natural acoustic-based instruments, these songs featured prominent drum machines and synthesizers. "Brightest Light in the Room" was written for two female US Army veterans on the occasion of their wedding engagement.

A third standalone single, "Anti-Gravity", was released in August 2012. The song was written by Curtis on the occasion of the death of her neighbor, opera composer Daniel Catán.

On June 18, 2013, Curtis released her debut full-length album of downtempo dreampop, Cinemascope, produced by her husband, Jamie Hill. Cinemascope was subsequently nominated in the 2014 Independent Music Awards in the category of Best Producer.

Curtis released her follow-up album Metaforma on June 17, 2014. Curtis also released a companion acoustic album on the same day, entitled Personal Songs Volume 1. Curtis initially sold this album only at shows, eventually releasing it worldwide on October 21, 2014.

Between 2013 and 2022, Curtis released one full-length studio album every year.

The title song from Curtis's 2022 album Good to Me hit #1 on radio station KBGE in September 2022.

== Touring ==
Curtis has done 12 national and 7 regional tours since 2007.

From 2012 through 2020, all of Curtis's house concerts were performed in the living rooms and back yards of her supporters. Curtis performed over 600 house concerts in that time.

In 2023, Curtis announced that she was moving her performances out of back yards and living rooms and into small theaters, and that she and Hill would be making their theater debut at the Sofia Theatre in Sacramento, CA on April 22. This performance marked Curtis and Hill's debut as a synthpop duo.

Curtis and Hill subsequently announced The Good to Me Tour on Instagram on August 4, 2023. Curtis and Hill performed the first leg of The Good to Me Tour in September, 2023, with shows in Pennsylvania, Vermont, Nebraska, and Missouri.

In 2025, after releasing the cover album 80s kids, Curtis embarked on a U.S. tour that continued into 2026 after the release of the second installment, 80s kids 2.

== House concert touring and book ==
Frustrated with what she characterized as difficulty making progress on the traditional club and coffeehouse touring circuit, Curtis started experimenting in 2011 with supplementing her regular touring schedule with house concerts. She found house concerts to be "the most rewarding, fulfilling, and successful kind of touring I’ve ever done", and soon abandoned traditional touring to focus exclusively on house concert touring. Curtis and Hill developed a highly profitable model for house concert touring, and in February 2014 published a how-to book detailing their method, titled "No Booker, No Bouncer, No Bartender: How I Made $25K On A 2-Month House Concert Tour (And How You Can Too)."

== Personal life ==
Curtis lives in Tacoma, Washington. She is married to producer/engineer Jamie Hill.

== Discography ==
- Boomerangs & Seesaws EP (2007)
- Paris Can't Have You EP (2008)
- Why Don't You Stay? EP (2009)
- "I play the piano and sing love songs" (2010)
- Brightest Light in the Room Maxi-Single (2011)
- Let's Stay In Mega-Single (2012)
- Cinemascope (2013)
- Metaforma (2014)
- Personal Songs Volume 1 (2014)
- Connections (2015)
- Creationism (2016)
- Personal Songs Volume 2 (2016)
- The Space Between (2017)
- Both at the Same Time (2018)
- Personal Songs Volume 3 (2018)
- Revolutionary Acts of Optimism (2019)
- And Her Whisper Becomes a Storm (2020)
- 2020101 (2021)
- Good to Me (2022)
- 80s kids (2025)
- 80s kids 2 (2026)
