= Savage Sun =

American rapper

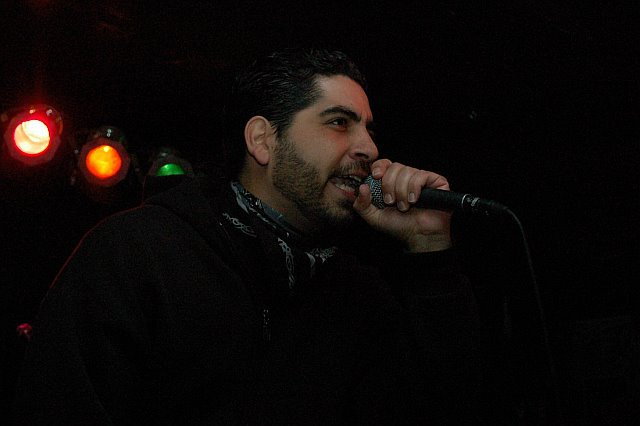
- Savage Sun performing live in Richland, Washington, 2009

Background information
- Also known as: Savage Sun, Cult Classic
- Born: Christopher Lee Schamber
- Origin: Stockton, California, U.S.
- Genres: Hip hop
- Occupation: Rapper
- Years active: 2003–present
- Labels: Sentient (2004-present); Globe Massive Entertainment (2013-present)
- Website: www.savagesun.com

Christopher Lee Schamber, better known by his stage name Savage Sun, is an American rapper and hip hop recording artist from Stockton, California.

== Biography ==
Although Savage Sun has been performing worldwide and recording music since the late 1990s, he didn't take on the moniker Savage Sun until the year 2003. He gained considerable visibility in the underground hip-hop scene when he was selected as one of URB's Next 1000 in 2009, and received a favorable artist review by URB (magazine) reviewer Aylin Zafar, who wrote "Melding classical music with pulsating beats and emcee Savage Sun's hard-hitting flow, the California native, but current Missouri resident's sound is unique and emotional." Earlier in the same year, Savage Sun's song "The Reason" garnered more than 1,650,000 dedications (February 2009), making it the most iLike dedicated song across Facebook during that particular month. Savage Sun has been featured in newspapers across the United States, including the Tri-City Herald, The Record, The Monterey County Herald, the Riverfront Times (Village Voice Media), and the St. Louis Post-Dispatch. Savage Sun's music has been featured or reviewed in various magazines and music blogs, including URB Magazine, Murder Dog Magazine, Inbox Magazine, and Reactor Magazine. Savage Sun's music has received extensive radio play, including rotation on Elevated Rhymestate 88.1 KDHX, college radio, Clear Channel's IHeartRadio, and can be found on over 800 live, local radio stations around the United States. His music has also been featured on various different internet radio stations, including the Midnight Mixtape on Chuck D's Rapstation.com. Savage Sun has released two music videos to date and one teaser for the song "The Finale" which is expected to be released on his forthcoming album "The Alchemy Of Sound."

In 2007, Savage Sun was featured on "The Next Generation Of Heads, a compilation released by Equalibran Productions, which also featured production by DJ Premier. Savage Sun has been featured on dozens of additional compilations and collaborative projects during the past decade, although only a handful of these releases were pressed in at least 1000 units, therefore, the distribution of the other releases has primarily been digital, and the impact and relevance is unknown.

Since 2000, Savage Sun has performed internationally, including performances in New Zealand, Costa Rica, Germany, Colombia, Uruguay, and an impromptu street performance in Belgium in 2002. Between 2000 and 2003, Savage Sun performed under different pseudonyms, including performing at the 2000 Big Day Out music festival in Auckland, New Zealand, alongside artists such as Nine Inch Nails, Red Hot Chili Peppers, Foo Fighters, Blink-182, The Chemical Brothers, Joe Strummer and the Mescaleros and various other acts. Savage Sun has also performed at many other high-profile music festivals and events, including S.L.U.M. Fest, Play STL Fest, and the St. Louis Scribble Jam Prelim. Savage Sun has shared the stage with a variety of notable acts, including Akil the MC (Jurassic 5), Bicasso and Sunspot Jonz (Living Legends), Ra Scion (Common Market) and many other artists. On a national level, Savage Sun has performed in dozens of cities across the United States, including universities such as Washington University in St. Louis and Saint Louis University and distinguished venues such as Blueberry Hill in St. Louis, MO and Berbati's Pan in Portland, OR. On June 27, 2014, Savage Sun received attention by entertainment writer of The Blender, Kevin Johnson, in a featured interview that was released in the St. Louis Post-Dispatch and STLtoday, highlighting his second performance at the largest hip-hop festival in the Midwest. In 2015, Savage Sun's music video for the song Forced was honored as an official selection by the Richmond International Film Festival and was also featured on IMDB. On Dec. 29th, 2017, Savage Sun released the first single 'Don't Change A Thing' from his forthcoming album 'The Alchemy Of Sound.' On June 30, 2018, Savage Sun released the second single 'A Darker Flame' from his forthcoming album 'The Alchemy Of Sound.'

== The Art Of Being Alive LP/DVD ==
On September 23, 2007, Savage Sun released his first full-length solo LP "The Art Of Being Alive" in conjunction with the Autumn Equinox. The physical version of the album is accompanied by a DVD (second disc) that featured a music video for the song "Tight Grip On Nothing", as well as other interactive features. The album was released on the independent label "Sentient Productions" and was mastered by industry professional Stephen Marsh. The album was released to a worldwide audience in 19 countries, spanning four continents, as well as distributed in the Caribbean Islands. The album received positive reviews from industry and independent reviewers alike, including a review by Brad Bush of CD Baby who called it "One of the best we've ever heard." The album was also selected as one of CD Baby's editor's picks and was showcased on the front page of the online music store's website.

Ian Hill of the Stockton Record described Savage Sun's debut album "The Art Of Being Alive" as bringing together complex, layered beats with (Savage Sun's) intense delivery and often-introspective lyrics. Hill wrote that "the title speaks volumes" and compares Savage Sun to Atmosphere and Sage Francis by stating that if you've listened to the aforementioned artists, that "you'll recognize the sound, feel and sense of struggle" on Savage Sun's album. In a separate review, Hill noted about the album that "it's refreshing to hear another voice taking rap in a different direction." Marc Cabrera of the Monterey Herald characterized the album as "A live wire mix of esoteric lyricism and mood music inspired by the seasons" and "A nice raw mix of some potent lyrics." Cabrera explained his interpretation of the album as Savage Sun's relationship to the Earth, to the world, to humanity, further expanding that he heard shades of Sage Francis. URB Magazine writer Aylin Zafar's analysis of the album garnered the following statement: "Helped along by melancholy piano and dizzying violin work, Savage Sun is bringing the focus back to the music."

== Rebel's Odyssey EP ==
On August 27, 2013, Savage Sun continued his signature album release in conjunction with a celestial event by dropping his second solo album, an EP titled "Rebel's Odyssey," during Neptune at Opposition. The album features two bonus tracks, a hidden track, and the physical version of the album is accompanied by a 20-page comic book detailing the origin of Savage Sun, which also corresponds with an animated music video for the song "Forced" which was featured on his first LP. The album also features "Bridge Da Gap", the first song of an international collaborative project. The song features emcee's from three different continents, rapping in Spanish, German, and English. The album also features the second song from the aforementioned international collaborative project, titled "The T.aK.eO.ver," with a special guest appearance by Pete Rock. The album was released on the independent label "Globe Massive Entertainment" and was mastered by industry professional Stephen Marsh. In March, 2014, The Monterey Herald published a featured interview and article discussing the new album. In November, 2013, Rebel's Odyssey received special consideration for Album of the Year by Wil Wander of KDHX Radio in the third annual Rhymey Awards. The EP placed third overall. On February 20, 2015, Savage Sun released his third music video for the song "I Can(t) Change", the first music video from Rebel's Odyssey EP.

== Discography ==
With Sentient Productions

- The Art Of Being Alive LP/DVD (2007)
- Rebel's Odyssey EP (2013)
- The Alchemy Of Sound LP (2018 - anticipated)

=== Music videos ===
Year	Song	Director(s)	Album
2004	Tight Grip On Nothing	David Strayer	The Art Of Being Alive
2013	Forced	David Strayer	The Art Of Being Alive
2013	The Finale (Teaser)	David Strayer	The Alchemy Of Sound
2015	I Can(t) Change	Tacuma Rami	Rebel's Odyssey

== Compilation appearances ==
- "Singlehandeadly" on AudioMight Records: AudioMight Presents (2002)
- "Circles" "Enter The Struggle" on AudioMight Records: The Character Development Sampler (2003)
- "Look The Other Way" on AudioMight Records: AudioMight Promo C.D. (2003)
- "Enter The Struggle" on CellarNoise: Noise from the Cellar vol.1 (2004)
- "Skybound" "We Wash Away (Remix)" on D.J. Balance Presents: Official bootleg vol.2 (2006)
- "Ghosts Of The Gangs" on My Shame: My Creation (2006)
- "Forced" on Miller Bay Productions: Beat Hogs (2007)
- "We Keep It Movin'" on Equalibran Productions: The Next Generation of Heads (2007)
- "We Keep It Movin'" on Cal Major: Arch City Underground Mixtape (2008)
- "In The City" on Heavenly Wharf Music: UAINTKNW? The Mixtape volume 2 (2010)
- "Bridge Da Gap" on Freedom Culture Coalition: Beats For Eats (2012)

== Acting ==
Beyond his music videos & a teaser on YouTube, Savage Sun has been featured in two independent films, I Am D.B. Cooper & Pill. Both films were produced by Team Wood Films, an independent film production company in St. Louis, MO. I Am D.B. Cooper was only released on YouTube and never officially released in theaters and therefore the response to the film has been lackluster. In Savage Sun's one scene, he portrays a manager at a company that must fire an employee. In Pill, Savage Sun portrays a district attorney who has a confrontation with another actor in the film. This film premiered at The Chase Park Plaza Hotel theater in St. Louis, MO on January 21, 2016. The budget for both films is unknown.
