= Richard Chavez =

American labor leader (1929–2011)

Richard Estrada Chavez
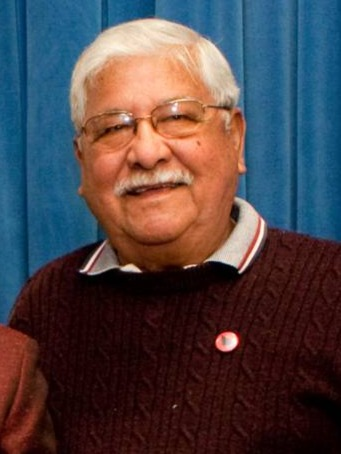
- Chavez in 2010
- Born: November 12, 1929; Yuma, Arizona, U.S
- Died: July 27, 2011 (aged 81); Bakersfield, California, U.S
- Known for: Labor leader and civil rights activist
- Partners: Sally Chavez; Dolores Huerta
- Children: 10
- Parents: Librado Chavez (Father); Juana Estrada (Mother)
- Relatives: César Chávez (Brother)

Richard Estrada Chavez (November 12, 1929 – July 27, 2011) was an American labor leader, organizer and activist. Chavez was the younger brother of labor leader César Chávez, who co-founded the National Farm Workers Association, which became the United Farm Workers (UFW). Richard Chavez is credited with building the UFW into a major California agricultural and political organization.

Chavez was born to a migrant family on November 12, 1929, in Yuma, Arizona, on a family farm. He worked as a child migrant worker during the Great Depression. He transitioned from farm work and later became a carpenter, working in lumber mills and joining a carpenter’s union apprenticeship program in San Jose, California. In the early 1960s, Chavez would leave his job as a carpenter in order to assist his brother Cesar Chavez in an effort to organize California farm workers. Richard Chavez along with Cesar Chavez and organizing leader Dolores Huerta co-founded the National Farm Workers Association, which would later become the United Farm Workers (UFW).

Richard Chavez spearheaded the construction of the UFW union hall, which became its headquarters, in Delano, California. Paul Chavez, the president of the Cesar Chavez Foundation and son of Cesar Chavez, told the Los Angeles Times that Richard "was there before there was a union." In 1962, Richard Chavez designed the iconic logo of the United Farm Workers, which features a black Aztec eagle. (Cesar Chavez chose the red and black colors of the union.) Decades later, U.S. President Barack Obama called the eagle "a symbol of hope that has helped carry the struggle for the rights of farm workers forward for almost five decades." In 1963, Chavez helped establish the UFW credit union by using his home as collateral.

In 1966, Chavez became the founding director of the National Farm Workers Service Center, which opened up social services to farm workers. Chavez helped organize the Delano grape strike and boycott which was led by Dolores Huerta, and spanned five years during the late 1960s. He organized a boycott in Detroit in 1973 and helped with a boycott in New York City. While in New York City, Chavez led contract negotiations affecting 30,000 members.

Richard Chavez served as the third Vice President of the United Farm Workers from 1972 until his retirement in 1984. Chavez retired from the UFW in 1983, but continued to serve on the board of directors of the Cesar Chavez Foundation and the Dolores Huerta Foundation. Chavez worked as a Los Angeles-based custom home builder during the 1990s after he received a California contractor's license. Chavez visited President Obama at the White House in 2010 to mark Cesar Chavez Day.

For many years, Chavez partnered with fellow labor leader Dolores Huerta. Richard's romantic relationship with Dolores began in the early 1970s, and lasted until Richard's death. They never married, but four children were born of the relationship. Richard was married to Sally (née Gerola), who bore him five children, and who he became estranged from. She had complained to Cesar about the extra-marital relationship that Richard had with Dolores.

Richard Chavez died from complications of surgery at a hospital in Bakersfield, California, on July 27, 2011, at the age of 81.
