= Mily Treviño-Sauceda =

American writer, trade unionist, and farm worker

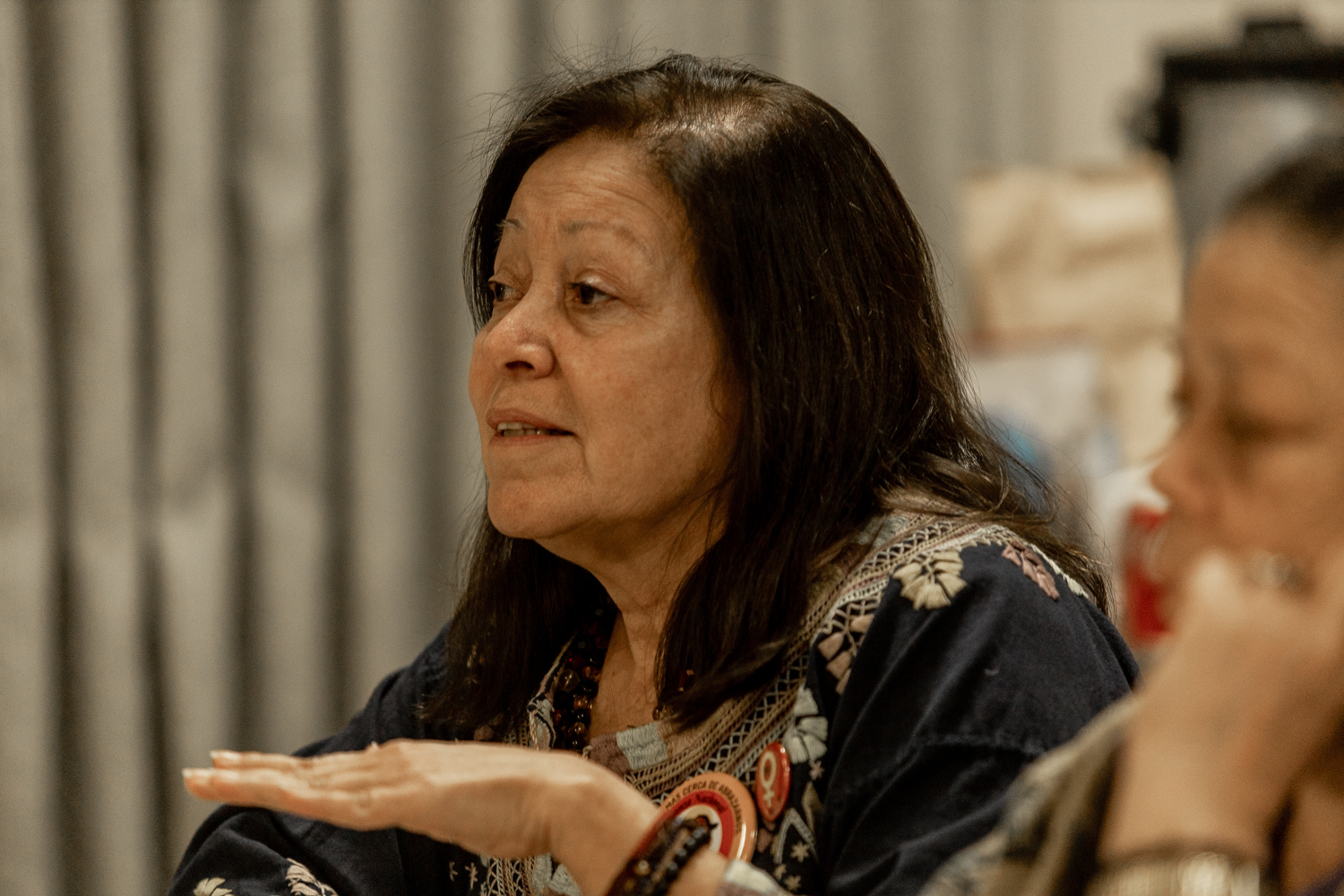
- Treviño-Sauceda at January 2022 National Farm Worker board meeting
- Born: 1957 or 1958 (age 68)
- Education: California State University, Fullerton; Antioch University
- Occupation: Trade unionist
- Known for: Women's farmworker movement

Mily Treviño-Sauceda (born 1957 or 1958) is an American writer, trade unionist and leader of the National Alliance of Farmworker Women, a nonprofit organization advocating for the safety and rights of women laborers in agriculture. She is celebrated as a founder of the women's farmworker movement in the United States. She was recognized twice by People magazine in 2006, and in 2018, Treviño-Sauceda was co-awarded the Smithsonian Institution's American Ingenuity Award for Social Progress.

== Early life and education ==
Treviño-Sauceda was born in Bellingham, Washington to farmworkers who immigrated to the United States from Mexico.

After her family relocated to Idaho, and then the Coachella Valley, Treviño-Sauceda started working in agricultural fields when she was 8 years old, and as a teenager experienced multiple sexual assaults. While working the fields with her brothers in Blythe, California, Treviño-Sauceda and other farmworkers were doused with pesticides.

Treviño-Sauceda attended California State University, Fullerton, earning a Bachelor of Arts in Chicana/o studies with a minor in Women's studies in 1997. She later was awarded a Master's degree in social science from Antioch University in 2014.

== Career and activism ==
Treviño-Sauceda joined the United Farm Workers as an agriculture field laborer in the 1970s.

In the 1980s while working at California Rural Legal Assistance she joined the California Community Workers Union.

In the late 1980s, Treviño-Sauceda joined as a member recruitment and orientation coordinator for the nonprofit organization Líderes Campesinas in California, originally known as "Mujeres Mexicanas", supported by the California Rural Legal Assistance Foundation, to bring awareness and change on human rights issues disproportionately affecting Mexican women in migrant communities in the Coachella Valley. She eventually was promoted to Executive Director, which she served as for 12 years, and later, the president emeritus.

In 1991, when she became pregnant with her son while working during the summer on a field, Treviño-Sauceda said she was discharged as soon as she started to physically appear pregnant, three months into her pregnancy. She said it wasn't until many years later that she realized it was pregnancy discrimination.

In 2011, she co-founded National Alliance of Farmworker Women with Mónica Ramírez, which was the first national grassroots women's farmworker organization.

In 2018, she joined the fourth cohort of Novo Foundation's Movement to End Violence.

As of 2018, she served the National Sexual Violence Resource Center as an advisor and the National Environmental Justice Advisory Council member to the United States Environmental Protection Agency.

Treviño-Sauceda has been recognized with a number of awards, including "100 Heroines of the World" in 1998, "Sister of Fire" in 2003, Ford Foundation and New York University's "Leadership for a Changing World" award in 2004, and two Cesar Chavez Legacy Award awards. She's been honored by Farmworker Justice, LatinoJustice PRLDEF, and People Magazine. In 2019, she was awarded the Visionary Voice Award.

In 2020, when the government deemed farm laborers "essential", COVID-19 spread through migrant Mexican communities. Treviño-Sauceda lobbied the Government of California and the California Department of Public Health to provide assistance to the affected people.

== Selected publications ==
- Treviño-Sauceda, Mily (February 14, 2022). "Women Farmworkers Demand Change". The Progressive.
- Treviño-Sauceda, Mily (May 23, 2020). "Essential farmworkers put food on our tables. Where are their basic protections?". USA Today.
- Barrett, June; Treviño-Sauceda, Mily (May 2, 2018). "#MeToo Is Creating a 'Ripple Effect' for Domestic and Farm Workers". Vice.

== Personal life ==
Treviño-Sauceda has one child and nine siblings. She lives in Pomona, California, where she coached girls' soccer in the 1990s.
