= Union of Democratic Filipinos =

Political organization

Democratic Union of Filipinos
- Katipunan ng mga Demokratikong Pilipino
- Abbreviation: KDP
- Formation: 1973
- Founded at: Santa Cruz, California
- Dissolved: 1986
- Headquarters: Oakland, California
- Key people: Bruce Occena, Melinda Paras, Rene Ciria Cruz, Silme Domingo, Gene Viernes, Cindy Domingo

The Union of Democratic Filipinos (Katipunan ng mga Demokratikong Pilipino, abbreviated as KDP) was a left-wing organization of Filipino Americans in the United States, active from 1973-1986. The KDP embraced the goal of fighting for socialism in the United States and opposing the Marcos dictatorship in the Philippines.

== Background ==
The first major wave of Filipino immigration to the United States began after the US colonization of the Philippines. Known as manongs, many people who had come to the US for economic prosperity found themselves working highly exploitative jobs and facing rampant racism. Many Filipino immigrants worked in the agricultural and fish canning industries and began organizing unions to fight for better working conditions and against racial discrimination and exclusionary immigration laws. The Cannery Workers and Farm Laborers Union was organized in 1933 and gave rise to many influential Filipino labor activists.

A resurgence in radical labor organizing began in the early 1970's when many Filipino youth, inspired by the Civil Rights, Asian American, and anti-Vietnam War movements, began challenging the racist practices in canneries and corruption in their unions. The works of Carlos Bulosan, Chris Mensalvas, Ernesto Mangaoang and other manong labor leaders experienced a revival. These young activists also were also inspired by the revolutions in Cuba, China, and other countries and made connections to the political situation in the Philippines. The KDP was formed in Santa Cruz in 1973 in response to the declaration of martial law by Ferdinand Marcos.

== Activities ==
Much of the KDP's work was centered around opposing martial law and the Marcos government. The KDP identified with the National Democratic Movement and New People's Army led by the Communist Party of the Philippines and was critical of Ninoy Aquino, Raul Manglapus, and other moderate political opponents of Marcos. Later, however, the KDP cut ties with the CPP due to disagreements over organizing the Filipino community in the United States, Corazon Aquino's run for president, and the Khmer Rouge. The KDP grew to have chapters in ten US cities, and the Seattle chapter quickly became the largest and most diverse in the country. The KDP also published a monthly national newspaper, Ang Katipunan.

KDP members organized anti-Marcos rallies and educational events, fought against gentrification and racial discrimination, and were involved in the majority Filipino cannery workers union (ILWU Local 37). The KDP was closely connected with left-wing activists in the Philippines who would regularly travel to the United States, and KDP members would also visit the Philippines and deliver money to anti-Marcos groups. Inspired by the actions of Tyree Scott and Black construction workers, KDP members Silme Domingo and Nemesio Domingo, Jr. launched racial discrimination lawsuits against canneries and helped found the Northwest Labor and Employment Law Office (LELO). The Domingo brothers and other KDP members were also involved in community organizing in Seattle's International District. Silme Domingo and Gene Viernes, another member of the KDP and Local 37, introduced a resolution at the 1981 ILWU convention for the union to conduct an investigation of the labor movement in the Philippines. It is widely believed by many who were associated with them at the time that this action drew special attention towards them by the Marcos regime.

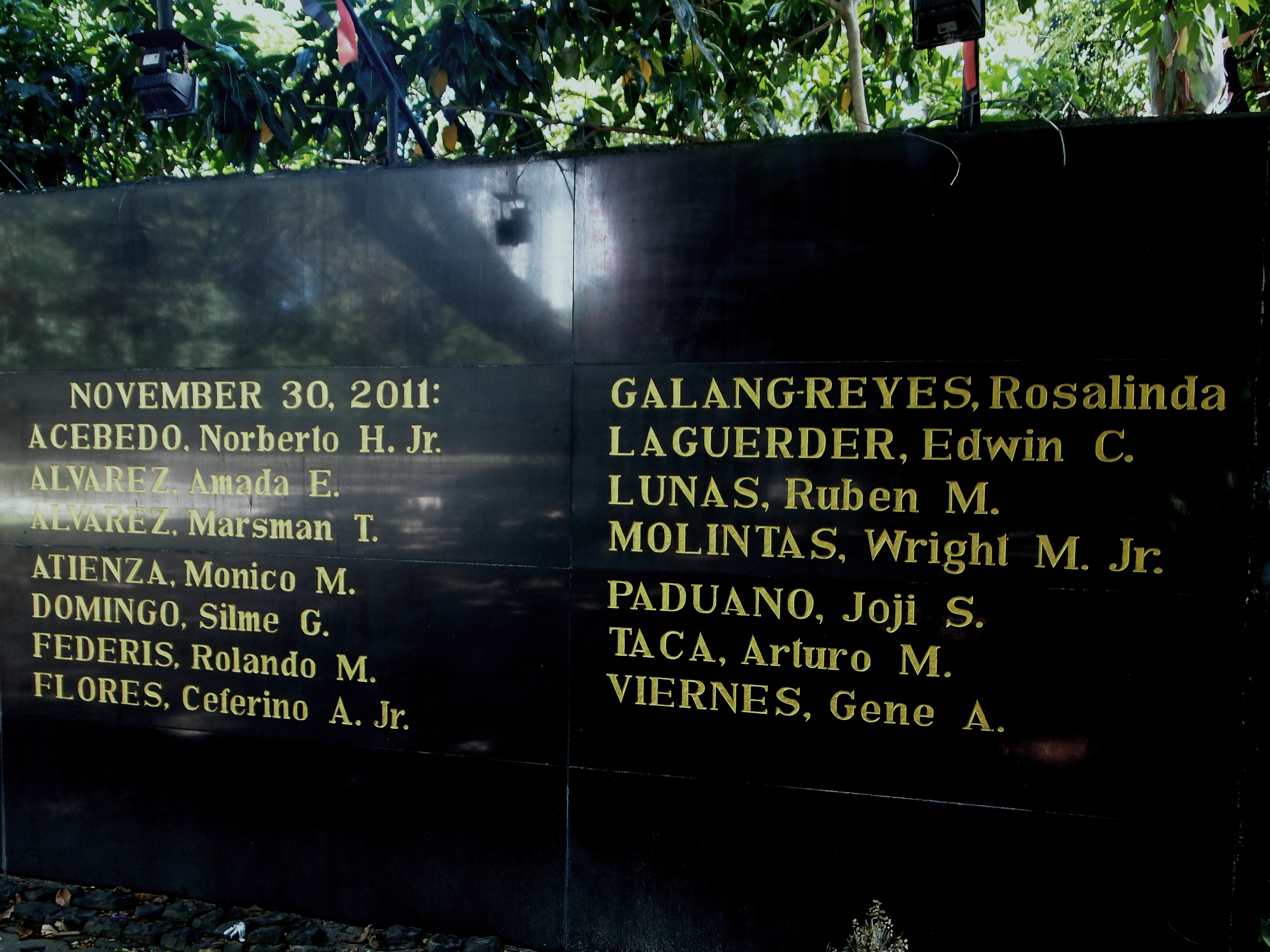
KDP members Silme Domingo and Gene Viernes listed among other martyrs on the Bantayog ng mga Bayani Wall of Remembrance in Quezon City

In June 1981, Silme Domingo and Viernes were murdered in their union hall in Seattle a month after the passage of the ILWU resolution. Viernes had recently implemented a new dispatch system based solely on seniority, replacing the old system based on bribery. The murders were committed by a group of Tulisan gang members and were made to appear as a dispute over dispatch. Family and friends formed the Committee for Justice for Domingo and Viernes (CJDV), and the murders became a central focus of many KDP leaders in the following years. After a years-long investigation and lawsuit, the CJDV proved that the murders were linked to the Marcos and paid for by his administration.

The KDP disbanded in 1986 after the People Power Revolution ended the Marcos dictatorship.

== Notable members ==
- Silme Domingo
- Gene Viernes
- Cindy Domingo
- Bruce Occena

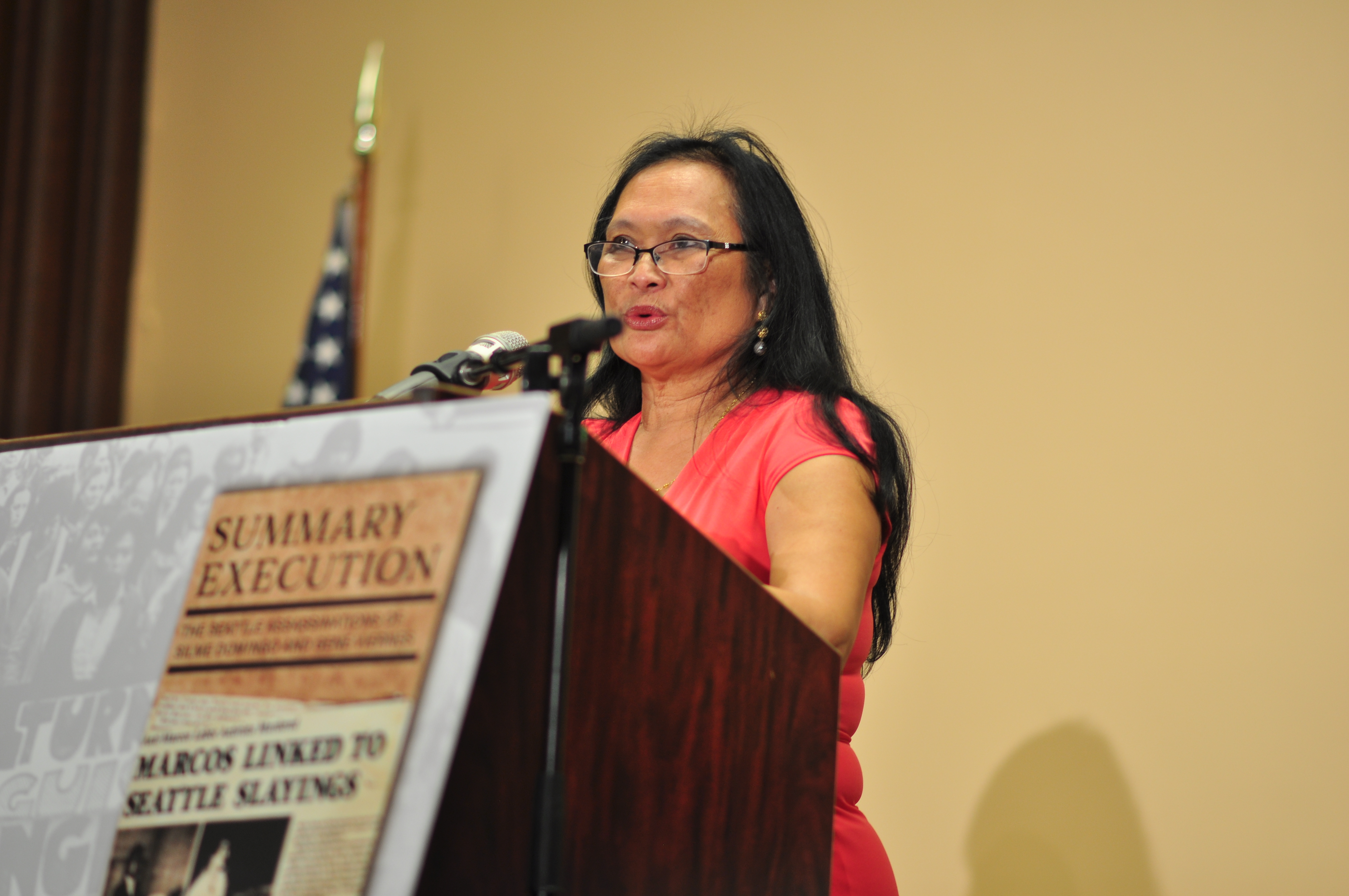
Cindy Domingo, a member of the KDP in Seattle and Oakland
