= Northwest Labor Employment and Law Office =

US labor organization

Northwest LELO
- Legacy of Equality, Leadership, and Organizing
- Formation: 1973
- Key people: Tyree Scott; Silme Domingo; Gene Viernes; Cindy Domingo; Garry Owens; Michael Woo; Milton Jefferson
- Website: lelo.org
- Formerly called: Northwest Labor and Employment Law Office

Northwest LELO, formerly the Northwest Labor Employment and Law Office, is an American labor organization founded by Black construction workers, Asian and Alaska Native cannery workers, and Latino farmworkers to fight racial discrimination in the workplace and in unions. LELO's tactics originally were centered around lawsuits but in the late 1980s became more focused on grassroots community organizing.

== Background ==
The roots of LELO lie in the work of Tyree Scott and the United Construction Workers Association (UCWA). The UCWA was founded in 1970 by Scott and other Black construction workers to fight racial discrimination in the building trades. In 1970, the US Justice Department sued five unions under Title VII of the Civil Rights Act of 1964 (US v. Ironworkers Local 86). A federal judge found that there had been racial discrimination and ordered a number of measures to be taken, including making the UCWA the point of entry for apprenticeship programs.

After the landmark decision, the UCWA began to expand its focus beyond Seattle and the building trades to other industries and areas of the country. In 1973, Michael Woo of the UCWA worked with Asian and Alaska Native cannery workers to form the Alaska Cannery Workers Association (ACWA) to fight the rampant racial discrimination in canneries. Founders and leaders of the ACWA included Silme Domingo, Nemesio Domingo Jr., Gene Viernes, and David Della. Following the model set by Scott and the UCWA, the ACWA filed racial discrimination lawsuits against some of the largest fish packing companies. Though it experienced victories in several cases, the ACWA was unable to win lawsuits and funding at a similar pace to the UCWA.

== History ==
In 1973, members of the UCWA, ACWA, and United Farm Workers came together to found the Northwest Labor and Employment Law Office. LELO hired lawyers to assist workers of color in pursuing racial discrimination lawsuits.

In addition to anti-discrimination and equal rights, LELO's work also emphasized international solidarity. Scott and other LELO members worked with local groups in Mozambique and South Africa to resist apartheid and fundraised for them. Many activists in the majority-Filipinx ACWA became involved in the Katipunan ng mga Demokratikong Pilipino (KDP), a Marxist organization that focused on resisting the Marcos regime in the Philippines. In 1981, founding LELO members Silme Domingo and Gene Viernes were murdered a month after passing a resolution in their union, ILWU Local 37, to establish a committee to investigate repression of the labor movement in the Philippines under Marcos. LELO joined a broad coalition of organizations calling for justice, and in 1989, the families won a $23.5 million lawsuit that proved the involvement of the Marcos regime in the murders.

In 1989, the landmark decision Wards Cove Packing v. Antonio caused LELO to shift its strategies and focus. The court decision changed the precedent for discrimination cases, placing the burden of proof on the plaintiffs rather than the employers. This made it significantly harder to pursue discrimination lawsuits. As a result, LELO shifted its primary focus to grassroots community organizing to support workers of color.

In the 1990s, LELO changed its name to Legacy of Equality, Leadership, and Organizing to better reflect its activities.

== See also ==
- Tyree Scott
- Cindy Domingo
- Silme Domingo
- Gene Viernes
- Garry Owens
