= Cindy Domingo =

American activist

- Domingo in 2018
- Organization(s): Democratic Union of Filipinos (KDP), Committee for Justice for Domingo and Viernes, Washington State Rainbow/PUSH, Legacy of Equality & Leadership Organizing (LELO)
- Spouse: Garry Owens
- Relatives: Silme Domingo (brother)

Domingo at FilBookFest (San Francisco, 2026)

Cindy Domingo is a Filipina-American activist and community organizer from Seattle, Washington. Domingo played a key role in Asian American and Filipino American activism in the 1970s and 1980s and became a leader in her community.

== Early life and education ==
Cindy Domingo grew up in Seattle's Ballard neighborhood with four siblings, among them Silme Domingo. Her father, Nemesio Domingo, Sr., was in the US army and had participated in the Philippines campaign during World War II. The family lived in Texas and Germany prior to moving to Seattle in 1960. Her father later worked as a farm laborer and was elected vice president of the Cannery Workers and Farm Laborers Union (ILWU local 37). She has stated that she was often the only person of color in her classes as a child.

Cindy Domingo graduated from Ballard High School and attended the University of Washington. She graduated with a BA in Asian American studies in 1976.

== Filipino youth activism ==
Domingo was active with the Katipunan ng mga Demokratikong Pilinio (Union of Democratic Filipinos, KDP) in the 1970s and 1980s, along with her brother Silme Domingo and other relatives. She lived in communal housing with other KDP members and organized in Seattle and Oakland. The KDP's work was primarily centered around opposing the Marcos dictatorship in the Philippines, and Domingo helped lead anti-Marcos demonstrations at the University of Washington.

On June 1, 1981, Domingo's brother Silme Domingo was assassinated with his friend and fellow organizer Gene Viernes in their office at the Local 37 hall. Silme and Gene were both KDP members and reform activists in ILWU, Local 37 who had worked to challenge racial discrimination in the canneries and corruption in the union. At the time of their assassination, Domingo was living in Oakland and working as a KDP organizer. She moved back to Seattle and for the next ten years chaired the Committee for Justice for Domingo and Viernes. The campaign resulted in the conviction of former Local 37 president Tony Baruso and proved that the assassinations had been organized by the Marcos regime with US government knowledge.

== Community organizing ==
In 1973, a group of Latine farmworkers, Black construction workers, and Asian and Pacific Islander cannery workers founded the Northwest Labor and Employment Law Office to be the legal arms of their organizations. After being defeated in the Supreme Court decision Wards Cove Packing Company v. Antonio, LELO's tactics shifted to focusing primarily on grassroots organizing led by workers of color. Cindy Domingo was one of the founders of LELO, along with Tyree Scott, Silme Domingo, Gene Viernes, Milton Jefferson, and other labor activists. She served on the board of LELO, which later changed its name to Legacy of Equality & Leadership Organizing.

In the 1980s Cindy Domingo was active in the Rainbow Coalition of Washington. She also served on the boards of the Church Council of Greater Seattle, US Women & Cuba Collaboration, and the International Examiner and as a legislative aide to Larry Gossett.

== Personal life ==
She married Garry Owens, a community organizer and former Black Panther, and they were married for over 30 years until Owens' death in 2022.
