= Filipinos in Alaska =

Total population
- 25,424

Languages
- English, Spanish, Tagalog, Philippine languages

Religion
- Catholicism, Protestantism, Buddhism, Irreligion, Others

Related ethnic groups
- Filipino American

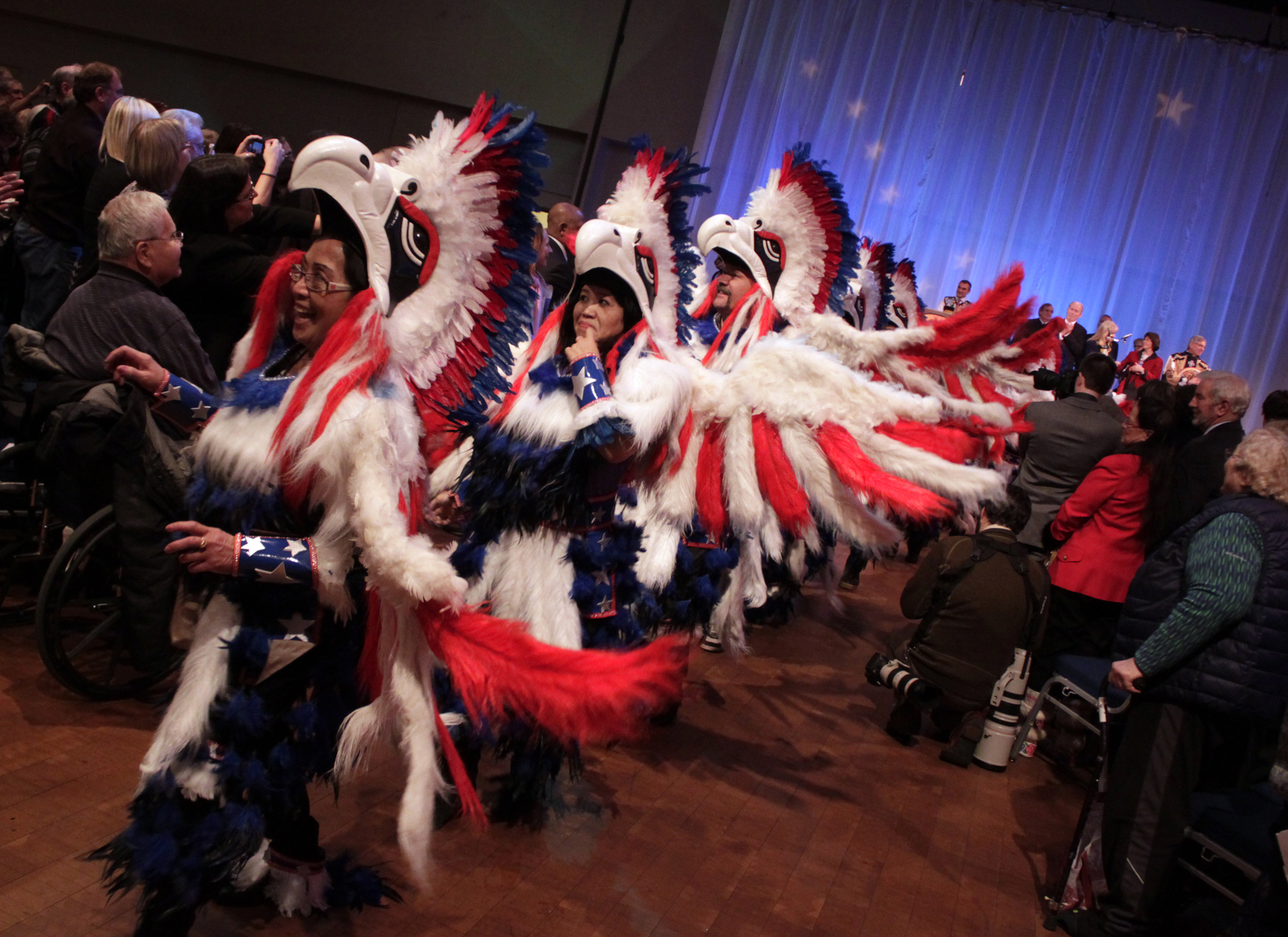
The Filipino Ati-Atihan festival Dancers, wearing eagle costumes, lead the exit procession from Alaska Gov. Bill Walker's inauguration ceremony Monday, Dec. 1, 2014 in Juneau, Alaska's Centennial Hall.

People of Filipino descent represent the largest Asian American subgroup in the State of Alaska. Filipino seamen are recorded as having contact with Alaska Natives as early as 1788, and Filipino immigrants continued to arrive as workers in Alaska's developing natural resource industries: as sailors on American whaling ships; as ore sorters for gold mines in Juneau and Douglas Island; and as salmon cannery workers (called Alaskeros). Alaska's Filipino community has a long history of interaction and intermarriage with Alaska Native communities, and many Filipinos in Alaska also claim Alaska Native heritage.

In 2014, Filipinos made up 52% of Alaska's Asian and Pacific Islander population. In 2010, they represented 2.7% of Alaska's total population. Filipino Americans are the largest racial minority in the city of Anchorage, and also have large numbers in the Aleutians and Kodiak Island.

== History ==
=== Early contact ===
Due to Manila's status as an entrepôt under Spanish imperialism, Filipino seamen found their way onto European ships crossing the Pacific to Alaska beginning in the late 18th century. The first recorded instance of a possible Filipino arriving in Alaska was in 1788. An unnamed "Manilla man" was a crew member on the British merchant ship Iphigenia Nubiana, which bartered for sea otter furs with Alaska Natives. In 1789, 29 Filipino seamen were present on the Eleonora and the Fair American, American fur trading ships that had stopped by Manila for repairs on their way to Alaska.

The Malaspina Expedition of 1791 also brought Filipino seamen to Alaska. They were replacements for the deserters from the originally Spanish crew and had been conscripted when Spanish corvettes had stopped in Manila. These Filipinos were likely to have been part of shore parties, sent to scout the Alaskan shore for the Northwest Passage. While in Yakutat Bay, a Filipino man from the expedition caught the attention of several Tlingit, who allegedly believed that he was one of them for his physical resemblance and begged him to remain with the tribe because they wondered if he had been bought or captured by the Spanish.

Filipino sailors were part of American whaling crews during the Alaskan whaling boom, beginning in 1848. Crews wintered in Jabbertown alongside Iñupiat communities in the far northeast of Alaska. Oral history demonstrates linguistic crossover from this period of contact, with some words of "a Philippine dialect in the Iñupiaq vocabulary."

In 1903, about 80 Filipinos formed a cableship crew that lay underwater communication cables connecting Southeastern Alaska with Seattle, thereby playing a vital role in the development of Alaska's modern communications system. Filipino cableship crews possessed unique technical expertise from their experience laying cables in the Philippines, which was being developed under the management of the U.S. Army.

=== Gold mining ===
Starting in the late 1920s, the discovery of gold deposits in Douglas Island and Juneau represented an industrial development that drew many Filipino laborers to Alaska. Brought over by contractors, Filipinos worked as ore sorters in the Alaska-Juneau Gold Mining Company, or the A-J Mine, and settled in Alaska when the mine closed in 1944.

Former Filipino mine workers went on to become significant fixtures in Filipino community organizations in Alaska. Gaspar Advincula and Benedicto Viloria, former ore sorters in the A-J Mine, were life members of the Filipino Community of Anchorage, while other mine employees who settled in Juneau married Tlingit women and became active members of the Filipino Community, Inc.

=== Alaskeros ===
Between 1898 and 1934, during the period of U.S. colonization, Filipinos were able to freely migrate to the United States as U.S. nationals. The salmon canning industry in Southeastern Alaska became a significant source of employment for Filipino workers, who called themselves "Alaskeros" and were primarily hired through Chinese, Japanese, and Filipino contractors.

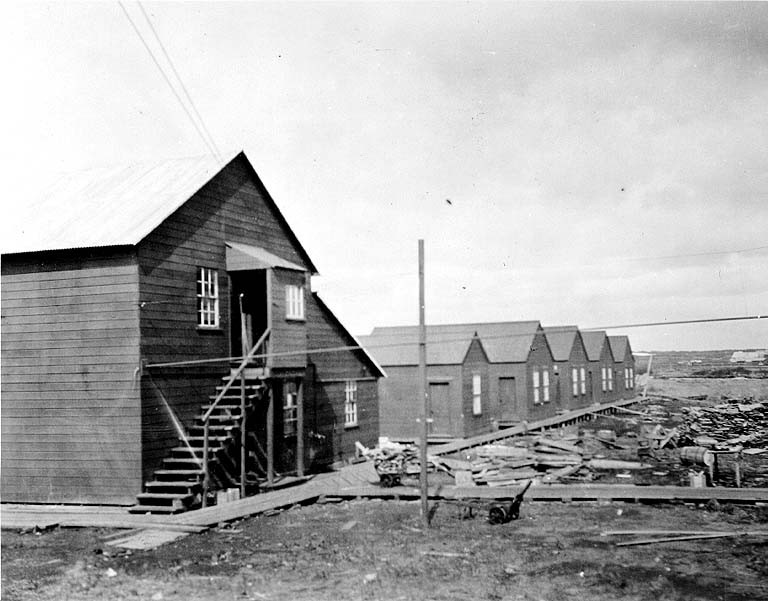
Quarters for Filipino workers at a salmon cannery in Nushagak, Alaska in 1917.

Because cannery jobs paid well, high compared to what a worker could earn in the Philippines, the limited-English population of Alaskeros was vulnerable to labor exploitation. Cannery crews traveled to Alaska in extremely poor conditions; over 200 workers were packed in ships only meant to hold 150, and given meager provisions of mostly rice and fish. Once at the canneries, Filipino cannery workers were also subject to abuse and racism. They were forced to buy groceries out of their wages, and lodged in cannery bunkhouses that were inferior to those provided for their white counterparts. As migrant workers, Alaskeros worked in salmon canneries during the summer, and lived in Washington, Oregon, or California during the rest of the year. Many were students looking to make money over the summer, in order to pay their keep during the academic year. Some of the workers even sent money to their families back in the Philippines. This encourages their siblings to move into the United States.

Major efforts to organize a union began in 1933, and eventually led to the creation of the Cannery Workers and Farm Laborers Union, which was the first Filipino-led union in the United States. The union faced significant opposition from labor contractors, including the assassination of first president Virgil Duyungan and secretary Aurelio Simon in 1936 by the nephew of a labor contractor. Both Duyungan and Simon became martyr figures for the union movement in Alaska and Seattle.

In 1982, a coalition of Filipino and Alaska Native cannery workers sued Wards Cove Packing Company, which owned several canneries in Alaska, on the basis of racial discrimination. From the beginning of their involvement in the salmon canning industry, Filipino and Native workers had been channeled into "non-skilled" jobs, recruited through contractors in the Philippines and directly from Alaska Native villages, while white workers tended to be hired for "skilled" and higher-paying positions. Wards Cove Packing Co. v. Atonio eventually made it to the Supreme Court in 1989, where the suit was denied on the basis that statistical disparities in nonwhite representation within higher and lower paying jobs were insufficient to prove disparate impact.

== Demographics ==
Despite centuries of Filipino presence in Alaska, an Alaskero named Johnny Oleta may have been the first to establish year-round residency around 1910, when he settled in Ketchikan following the cannery season. There were 246 Filipinos in Alaska by July 1910, according to the 1910 U.S. Census. Following years showed 93 Filipinos in Alaska in 1920, 164 in 1930, and 403 by 1940. By the 1920s, Filipinos were the largest single immigrant group in Alaska. The first permanent communities began to develop in Ketchikan and Juneau in the Southeast, and on Kodiak Island in the Southwest. Later on, Anchorage would become the location with the largest Filipino enclave, with smaller Filipino communities in Fairbanks, Valdez, and Kenai.

As they settled in the 1930s and 1940s, many former seasonal workers became business owners, particularly in the restaurant business. Because industrial laborers like Alaskeros were primarily men, they married and started families with women who were African American, Tsimshian, Tlingit, Haida, Aleut, and Yupik. Some of these new generations of multiracial Filipino Americans became part of Tlingit family structures, wherein children of sisters are considered to be siblings, not cousins. A few Filipinos of this generation married white American women.

A large wave of Filipino immigration in the 1940s arose from the wartime upheaval of World War II. Many Filipinos settled in Anchorage as military family or spouses, as military employees, or as members of the armed services. The Filipino community in Anchorage took on a white-collar character, with a different profile from the Filipino communities in Ketchikan and Juneau, which were primarily concentrated around the fish industry.

Today, Filipino Americans still hold a significant presence in Alaska. Despite modest economic growth since 1977 and slowing immigration from other demographic groups, Filipino migration to Alaska has continued, due to existing family ties and the history of the migration pathway, as well as the growth of the healthcare sector and the favorable economic climate. Tagalog is the third most commonly spoken non-English language in 2010, after Spanish and Yupik.

== Culture ==
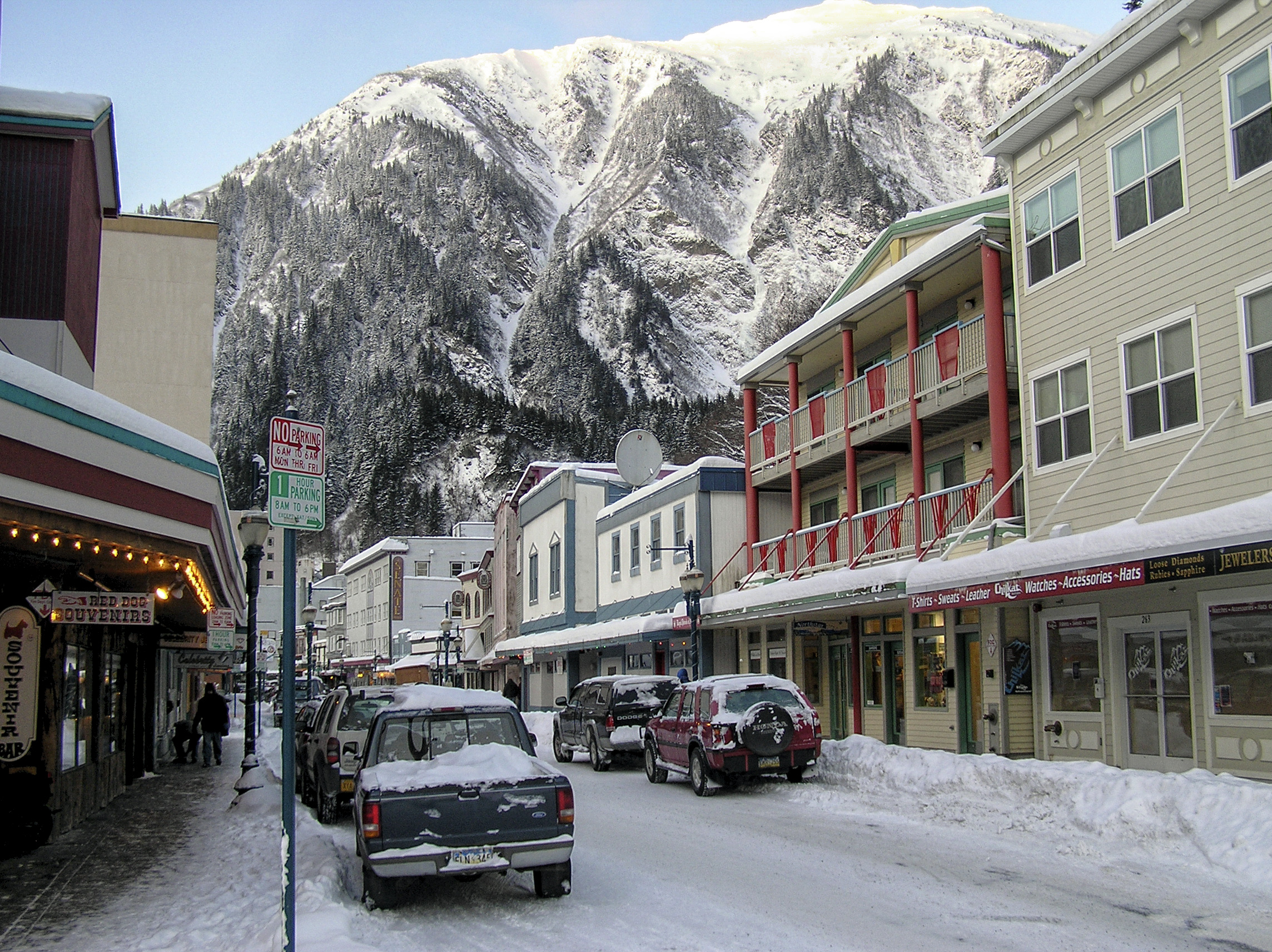
Filipino Community Hall (center) on Franklin St, Juneau Downtown Historic District, Southeast Alaska.

Several Filipino communities across Alaska have formed incorporated community organizations as spaces for communal gathering. The Filipino Community Club of Ketchikan, formed in 1938 from what was previously the Filipino Social Club, may have been the first of its kind in Alaska. The organization gave Filipinos the chance to engage with local politics, speaking with public officials and discussing the grievances of the Filipino community in Ketchikan.

The Filipino Community of Anchorage started with an informal Filipino group called the "Bachelor's Club" in 1953. (147) Filipinos in Anchorage were gathering and celebrating community long before this, however, with Filipino boxers performing at the 1937 Independence Day celebration in Anchorage. The Bachelor's Club of Anchorage turned into the Filipino Community of Anchorage and Vicinity (FCAV) in 1957, becoming more family-oriented with the arrival of men's wives and children, and the community was incorporated in 1968.

The Filipino Community Incorporated of Juneau originated with the many Filipino-Tlingit families in the area. Out of concern for their multiracial children, who were not fully accepted by other Filipinos or Tlingit, Tlingit wives of Filipinos in Juneau held box socials and bake sales to raise money for a community hall. The Filipino Community Inc., a social nonprofit, was organized in 1956, and a building purchased for the Filipino Community Hall in downtown Juneau. Many of the Tlingit women of the Filipino Community Inc. were also involved with the Alaska Native Sisterhood, an indigenous civil rights organization founded in 1915, and the shared history of the two organizations continues to be celebrated.

== Notable Filipinos in Alaska ==
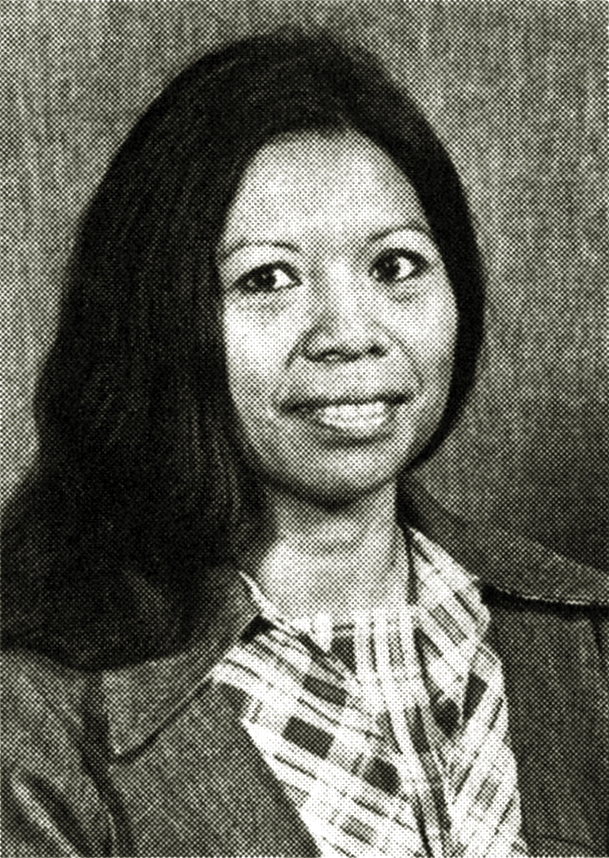
Thelma Juana Buchholdt (born Garcia; 1934–2007) was a Filipino-born American lawyer, politician and writer.

- Thelma Buchholdt – community activist, politician, historian, public speaker, cultural worker, and author, elected to the Alaska House of Representatives between 1974 and 1982.
- E.J.R. David – professor at the University of Alaska Anchorage, and author and community activist known for work in Filipino American psychology and mental health.
- Dr. Gabriel Garcia – professor that teaches Public Health at the University of Alaska Anchorage.
- Marie Husa – investigator for Anchorage Equal Rights Commission, licensed professional life coach, board member and ex-president in the Alaska Federation of Filipino Americans.
- Genevieve Mina – State Representative for Alaska House District 19 presumed office in 2023, president of Alaska Young Democrats
- Shayne Nuesca – journalist, Radio Television Digital News Association Edward R. Murrow Award winner, former digital editor and first director of content strategy at KTOO where she developed frameworks for the inclusion of Filipino Americans in coverage by Alaska media.
- Jesse V. Vizcocho – community activist, politician, cultural worker, Former Deputy Mayor and Councilmember, City of Kodiak, Alaska between 1997 and 2003, Government Relations & Legislative Affairs Director & FilAm Vote Director, National Federation of Filipino American Associations (NaFFAA), Vice President for Internal Affairs, Asian American Unity Coalition (AAUC), President & Founder, Asian American Pacific Islander Coalition of Alaska (AAPICA)

== See also ==
- Alaskeros
- Cannery Workers and Farm Laborers Union, Local 7
- Demographics of Alaska
- Filipino American National Historical Society
- Filipino Americans
- Overseas Filipinos
