= Take Your Pick of Disgusting Foods =

2017 children's non-fiction book by G.G. Lake

- Book cover
- Author: G.G. Lake
- Language: English
- Series: Take Your (Equally Horrible) Pick
- Genre: Children's literature Non-fiction
- Publisher: Capstone Press
- Publication date: 2017
- Publication place: United States
- Pages: 32
- ISBN: 978-1-5157-4470-2

Take Your Pick of Disgusting Foods is a 2017 children's non-fiction book by G.G. Lake. The book discusses a variety of food and drink from around the world that it describes as "disgusting", asking readers which of two choices they would prefer to consume.

In February 2020, Take Your Pick of Disgusting Foods was criticized on Twitter, where users said that its contents were racist and culturally insensitive. Publisher Capstone Press announced in response that it would withdraw the book from sale.

== Synopsis ==
Take Your Pick of Disgusting Foods asks readers: "What if all you had to eat were disgusting foods? Which would you pick?" The book presents a series of choices between two foods or drinks, including a short description of both items and their geographical origin. At the end of the book, the foods are reorganized into different pairs, and readers are asked which they would prefer in a particular situation (such as "at breakfast", "lunch on summer vacation", or "on a cold winter's night").

The 22 foods and drinks included in the book are:

- Cow's blood
- Kopi luwak
- Foie gras
- Tripe
- Lutefisk
- Goat's head
- Tarantula
- Scorpion
- Witchetty grub
- Mopane worm
- Nattō
- Jibachi senbei (Japanese rice crackers that contain wasps)
- Casu martzu
- Hákarl
- Balut
- Cuy
- San-nakji
- Muktuk
- Bird's nest soup
- Svartsoppa
- Head cheese
- Khash

== Background ==
Take Your Pick of Disgusting Foods is part of Capstone Press' "Take Your (Equally Horrible) Pick" series, which invites readers to "investigate the scariest and grossest things you can imagine with this fun set of facts! If you had to choose, which would you pick?" Other books in the series include Take Your Pick of Haunted Places, Take Your Pick of Monster Encounters, and Take Your Pick of Survival Situations.

== Publication history ==
Take Your Pick of Disgusting Foods was published in 2017.

In February 2020, University of Alaska Anchorage psychology professor E.J. Ramos David criticized Take Your Pick of Disgusting Foods on Twitter for the book's inclusion of muktuk (whale blubber, usually eaten raw by Arctic peoples) and balut (fertilized bird eggs with partially developed embryos, eaten whole as a popular street food in Southeast Asia). David said that the book was teaching his children, who had mixed Filipino and Athabaskan ancestry, that "their cultures are disgusting." David's tweet quickly gained traction, with other Twitter users calling out the book's contents for being racist.

In response, publisher Capstone Press agreed with David's criticism of Take Your Pick of Disgusting Foods, writing on Twitter that "we are taking steps to remove it from active sale." Capstone explained that the book's focus on "topics that are gross and disgusting" was part of an effort to "reach reluctant readers", but that "cultures and traditions never fit this description and the myopic view that produced this book is inexcusable." David praised the publisher's decision and said that the book could have contributed to teasing, bullying, and cultural insensitivity.

== Reception ==
The American Library Association included Take Your Pick of Disgusting Foods on its 2020 list of banned and challenged books in U.S. libraries, schools, and universities.

Take Your Pick of Disgusting Foods was listed as a "Popular Digital Nonfiction Read" for sixth graders in the 2020 version of Renaissance Learning's report "What Kids Are Reading". In an analysis of Renaissance's report, Jay Mathews wrote in The Washington Post that the book's title was a sign that "publishers sometimes seemed desperate to attract young readers".

== See also ==
- Filipino cuisine
- Filipinos in Alaska
- Indigenous cuisine of the Americas
