= Marasigan =

Marasigan is a Filipino surname. Notable people with the name include:

- Juan Marasigan Feleo (1948–2009), aka Johnny Delgado, Filipino actor, comedian and writer
- Angelo Marasigan (born 1992), Filipino footballer
- Bullet Marasigan (1939–2000), Filipino-American social worker and activist
- Jessica Marasigan, Filipino model and beauty queen
- Ramón Diokno y Marasigan or Ramón Diokno (1886–1954), Filipino statesman, jurist, Associate Justice
- Raymund Marasigan (born 1971), Filipino musician and record producer
- Tina Marasigan (born 1988), Filipina model, beauty queen and journalist
- Ysay Marasigan (born 1994), Filipino indoor and beach volleyball player

== See also ==
- Jerry Marasigan, WPD, 1992 Filipino action film directed by Augusto Salvador
