= Bruce Occena =

Asian American activist

Bruce Occena is a Filipino American activist and scholar involved with the Asian American movement in the San Francisco Bay Area. He played a major part in the International Hotel as a resident, a student who renovated the hotel, and a member of the hotel's United Filipino Association (UFA). His activism was largely built upon a Marxist–Leninist framework, addressing issues such as Anti-Marcos sentiment and those raised by the Third World Liberation Front. He is a co-founder of the Union of Democratic Filipinos, also known as Katipunan ng mga Demokratikong Pilipino (KDP).

== Early life and education ==
Occena grew up in New York City. His father had emigrated from the Philippines in pursuit of education in the United States, but ended up staying and marrying a white woman. Both parents worked various factory jobs as well as in canneries. The three of them lived together in tenement housing throughout Occena's childhood.

Occena was first introduced to higher education after transferring to a Catholic school in New York. He attended the University of California, Berkeley, where he and many of his fellow Filipino students benefited from the Equal Opportunity Program.

== Activism ==
While a student at the Berkeley, Occena was involved in the 1968 Third World Liberation Front strikes, helped lead to the establishment of Ethnic Studies in higher education. He was a key member of the Asian American Political Alliance (AAPA) and, alongside Emil de Guzman, Trinity Ordona, and Lillian Fabros, was one of its few Filipino members. He later became an educator at Berkeley, teaching a Philippine studies class. AAPA's work centered on national and international solidarity against imperialism, basing their political views on Maoism.

He was part of the KDP's National Executive Board.

Occena was a founding member of the Katipunan ng mga Demokratikong Pilipino (KDP) and participated in the Alaska Cannery Workers Association (ACWA). He was also part of the original team for the International Hotel struggle, a member of the Line of March (LOM), and was one of the first Americans to participate in the Venceremos Brigade to Cuba, where he began to develop Marxist–Leninist politics.

=== International Hotel struggle ===
The International Hotel (I-Hotel) in San Francisco, California, was a residential building in Manilatown that housed primarily low-income Filipino and Chinese residents. Plans to demolish the building were set in June 1968; however, the tenants did not receive an eviction notice until October of that year. Its elderly residents, especially, had very few options, leaving many of them at risk of homelessness, along with losing their place in the community. Occena was one of the AAPA Berkeley students who moved into the I-Hotel and worked to renovate the hotel while resisting the eviction of its tenants. In its early days of renovation, he worked at the I-Hotel as a student supporter; he then helped found KDP and led all aspects of its work from its National Executive Board. He was a member of the United Filipino Association (UFA), which advocated for welfare, housing, and medical care for older people living in the I-Hotel.

== Radicalization ==
Occena's radical ideals were based on the relations between the United States and the Philippines and the communities his parents grew up in. His political standing originated in student activism and became transnational, then locally focused, keeping the influence of Filipino liberation at the core of his work. Occena studied Marxism and joined the Venceremos Brigade. In 1969, he went to Cuba, traveling among the first groups of Americans to break the blockade of travel and goods from the United States. His participation in breaking the blockade contributed to Occena becoming interested in Marxism and Communism. At the University of California, Berkeley, Occena joined a study circle he and other Marxists read works by Marx and Lenin in-depth. In addition, Occena also had connections with the Black Panthers on campus who would sell newspapers and essays to those interested in both the Black Panther Party as a whole but also Marxism–Leninism. Being involved in both the Venceremos Brigade and Marxism helped lead to his radicalization that would later set the foundation for the Third World Liberation Front and the KDP.

=== Founding the KDP ===
As they were able to connect with the Philippines, the Katipunan ng mga Demokratikong Pilipino (KDP) had a international influence, especially during the 1972 declaration of martial law under Ferdinand Marcos. The KDP was modeled after Kabataang Makabayan (Nationalist Youth) in the Philippines, supporting the political work Occena referred to as the "dual line program", which simultaneously called for the struggle against racism and socialism in the United Statesand imperialism in the Philippines. The KDP had chapters across the country and were the main opposition to Marcos' dictatorship.

=== Cannery Union activism ===
The Alaska Cannery Workers Association (ACWA) was established to address racial discrimination and labor exploitation in the Alaskan salmon canning industry, particularly as it affected Filipino and other Asian American workers.

One of Occena's main areas of focus within the ACWA was supporting the organization's legal efforts, including class action lawsuits against major seafood processing companies alleging violations of Title VII of the Civil Rights Act of 1964. The lawsuits targeted discriminatory practices in hiring, promotions, and housing. Filipino workers were frequently assigned the lowest-paid and most physically demanding jobs and were often housed separately from white workers in inferior conditions. These cases aimed to eliminate racial segregation in employment and worker housing within the canneries.

As the lawsuits progressed, Occena supported a shift in the ACWA's strategy from relying solely on legal remedies to incorporating union reform. He advocated for direct engagement with the International Longshore and Warehouse Union (ILWU) Local 37, which represented many of the cannery workers. At the time, leadership within Local 37 had been criticized for a lack of responsiveness to the needs of rank-and-file members, particularly younger and more progressive workers. Occena was involved in organizing efforts to elect new local leadership and increase worker participation in union governance.

Occena worked with other ACWA members to develop internal educational initiatives that encouraged political involvement and leadership among Filipino-American cannery workers. These efforts included holding meetings, workshops, and election campaigns.

=== Sexuality in the KDP ===
Despite the KDP's support for the Gay Liberation Movement, many of its organizations were dominated by white men at the time, which further isolated and deterred Filipino activists from joining them due to their differing cultural and political priorities. Queer feminist scholar Karen Hanna emphasizes the importance of KDP's reputation in the Asian American Movement, which she describes led to the pressing, selfless determination for leaders to prioritize centering their work on collective human rights struggles. As a result of these efforts, discussions regarding personal identity, including relationships and sexuality, were often seen as private matters secondary to KDP's collective work. For members like Occena, who later considered himself bisexual, this environment in KDP created a tenuous but significant pressure to avoid discussing sexual identity as a means to center the movement on broader human rights issues. This led to subtle hesitation around coming out during his time in the organization.

=== After the KDP ===
Occena was part of the Ang Kalayaan Collective, the precursor to the Katipunan ng mga Demokratikong Pilipino (KDP) that was officially formed in July 1973. In Kalayaan, he worked with Cynthia Maglaya.

Max Elbaum, the leader of the Northern California Alliance and close collaborator of Occena, recalls how he worked with KDP leaders Occena and Melinda Paras as well as the leader of the Third World Women's Alliance (TWWA), Linda Burnham, to found the Rectification Network. The Rectification Network was the precursor to Line of March and a longer line of groups and publications associated with Marxist–Leninist movement, The Trend. He was a co-editor of Line of March: A Marxist-Leninist Journal of Rectification with Irwin Silber, and on the publication's editorial board along with Silber, Elbaum, Dale Borgeson, Linda Burnham, Melinda Paras, and Bob Wing.

Occena was the chair of the Line of March's executive committee until the publication disbanded officially in the Fall of 1989.

=== Governmental pushback ===
On March 16, 1970, the Senate Congressional Record listed a report presenting the Passenger Manifest for the Venceremos Brigade in Cuba as a list of threats to potentially "return to the United States to implement the Communist purpose of causing chaos, confusion, and outright revolution in our institutions of higher learning, in the streets of our cities, and all across our Nation". Because of his involvement in the Venceremos Brigade, Occena's name was on the list, thus marking him as a potential enemy of the state.

The coincidence of Marcos agents' assassination of close activists to Occena, Silme Domingo and Gene Viernes, and the increased vigilance by the United States Government due to the 1981 drafted–but not ratified–Extradition Treaty with the Philippines increased FBI and CIA surveillance to blacklist prominent anti-Marcos activists and members of Filipino communities such as Occena.

== Later career ==
Occena is a Director of the Tele-health and Interpreter Services at the San Francisco Department of Public Health. In 2018, he co-authored a study on the importance of certified medical interpreters in relationship-centered care.

In 2018, Occena was interviewed for the UC Berkeley AAPA Oral History Project.

Occena was a co-editor of A Time to Rise: Collective Memoirs of the Union of Democratic Filipinos (KDP). The book consists of a collection of documents and personal accounts discussing the workings of the KDP during the politically turbulent 1970s and 1980s. It scopes into the revolutionary history of Filipinos in America, as well as the collective struggles for justice and democracy in the Philippines.
