= People's Institute (disambiguation) =

The People's Institute was founded in New York by Charles Sprague Smith in 1897 to focus on the Cooper Union.

People's Institute may also refer to:

- People's Institute for Applied Religion, founded by Claude C. Williams
- People's Institute for Survival and Beyond, of the Tyree Scott Freedom School
