= Garry Owens =

American activist (1945–2022)

- Born: 1945; Seattle, Washington
- Died: September 30, 2022; Seattle, Washington
- Education: Franklin High School, University of Washington
- Organization: Seattle Black Panther Party
- Spouse: Cindy Domingo
- Relatives: Silme Domingo (brother-in-law)

Garry Owens (1945 – September 30, 2022) was an American activist and community leader from Seattle, Washington, best known for being an early member of the Seattle Black Panther Party.

== Early life ==
Garry Owens was born in Seattle's Chinatown-International District in 1945 and grew up in various neighborhoods around South Seattle. His family frequently moved between different housing projects due to poverty. Owens later stated that the diversity of the neighborhoods he grew up in influenced him from an early age. He attended Franklin High School and became involved in the Congress of Racial Equality his senior year. After graduating from high school, Owens was drafted into the Vietnam War. Though he was never sent overseas, he later stated that his time in the army had a major influence on his political development. The time he spent in the South while in the Army caused him to think more critically about racism in Seattle.

== Activism ==
Owens returned to Seattle in 1967 and attended the University of Washington. In 1968, Owens helped found the UW's Black Student Union and participated in a sit-in that led to the creation of the university's Office of Minority Affairs and Diversity. In the same year, Owens joined the newly formed Seattle Black Panther Party. Owens was particularly drawn to the party because of its work to address poverty. When reflecting on his experiences in the Party, Owens stated that he was most proud of the free breakfast program, stating, "We didn’t just feed Black kids. We fed hungry kids." During his time in the party, Owens lived off of his VA income and financial aid at UW. In the early 1970's, however, Owens began to experience burnout due to the high amount of activity, losses in party membership, and chaos due to COINTELPRO. He left the party and moved to western Massachusetts and later New Orleans in 1972.

Owens moved back to Seattle in 1984. He was hired by the City of Seattle Office of Neighborhoods (later renamed Department of Neighborhoods) in 1989 to represent and advise policy towards underrepresented and lower income neighborhoods. Owens later became a manager for the city's Neighborhood Matching Fund, which provided support to community organizations for specific projects. During his career at the City, Owens was a member of IFPTE, local 17, and served as a shop steward for the union.

In addition to his activities in his union, Owens served on the board of Legacy of Equality, Leadership, and Organizing (LELO), a multiracial organization that advocates for racial and economic justice, for many years.

== Later life ==
Owens married Cindy Domingo, a community organizer in Seattle and sister of Silme Domingo. The couple had three children and were married for over 30 years, until Owens' death.

In his later life, Owens shifted his activism to focus on empowering and mentoring young people, who he saw as the leaders of the future. He also focused on building relationships with other community organizers and overcoming divisions. In 2018, Owens helped Franklin High School students create a mural celebrating the 50th anniversary of the founding of the Seattle Black Panther Party.

Owens died in 2022 from multiple health issues and complications due to COVID-19. In 2023, the Center for Ethical Leadership presented Domingo and posthumously honored Owens with its Leadership Legacy Award.
