= Alaskeros =

Filipino migrant workers in the United States

The Alaskeros are Filipino seasonal migrant workers in the United States and their descendants. They worked in salmon canneries in Alaska during the summer, and on farms in Washington, Oregon, and California during the rest of the year. The Alaskeros were instrumental in the formation of the first Filipino-led union in the U.S., the Cannery Workers and Farm Laborers Union, Local 7 (Seattle, WA).

== History ==
After Spain relinquished the Philippine Islands to the U.S. under the Treaty of Paris in 1898, Filipinos became American nationals and had the ability to migrate to the U.S. to find a better life, while providing cheap labor for the agriculture and fish cannery industries. A significant number first started being recruited for work by contractors for the salmon canneries and mines in Alaska. In the canneries, Filipinos worked with other groups of Asians loading and unloading trucks; and line jobs consisting of sorting, gutting, cleaning, and packing fish. The tasks of maintenance and operations were assigned to the whites. After negotiations of the Gentlemen's Agreement with Japan in 1908, along the Chinese Exclusion Act in effect, Filipinos arrived to the U.S. in significant numbers, taking the place of a large amount of the Chinese and Japanese labor workers in the canneries.

== Life In the U.S. ==
Seattle's International District became the homequarters for Alaskeros during the cold months of the year. They would share hotel and boardinghouse rooms to save money before sailing back up north to work in the canneries from late spring to late summer. The population of Alaskeros in Washington grew between 1910 and 1930 from 1,700 to 3,500. Nearly 1,000 Filipinos were recruited by Japanese and Chinese nationals in 1921 to work in the Alaskan fisheries, and by the mid-1930s, they had become the dominant population in the canneries. Despite this fact, very few Filipinos became contractors, as they were halted from advancing past the position of foreman. This was mainly due to the fact of contractor positions were being held by mainly Japanese and Chinese employees. They entered into the canning industry before the Filipinos, and they held onto these jobs, while Filipinos worked as unskilled laborers in mechanized plants. Filipinos were dependent on whatever the Chinese and Japanese contractors made available to them, and their lack of proficiency in the English language as well as the difference in wages between the U.S. and the Philippines left them to be taken advantage of. The contractors would sell them items that were supposed to be compensated to the workers, such as food, work supplies, bedding and lodging. Sometimes, the contractors would take off without paying Filipino laborers their wages at the end of the season, leaving them without any money, and with no way to leave. Some Filipino foremen would charge the workers half a month's wages as a finder's fee for the cannery job. Unfortunately, mistreatment of fellow ethnics by more competent workers is a common occurrence in the migrant society.

Alaskeros faced less discrimination in Alaska than in the Lower 48, mostly due to the Alaska Native and the large Asian community that was already present in the area. Some cannery workers lived in Alaska permanently, marrying Alaska Native women and establishing their own communities there. In 1935, they formed the Filipino Community of Juneau. Because of the images portrayed by American educators in the Philippines, some Filipinos were under the impression that a way into American society was easily obtained through marriage, often taking up with "women of color," and avoiding white women because of the social problems that might stir up. In California and Washington, white resentment against the Filipinos grew. Filipinos were often portrayed as sexual threats that wanted to mix with white and Mexican women, and concerns over "hybridization" caused several race riots to come to a head. Whites tried to drive out Filipinos from their communities. The incident near Watsonville, California, in 1930 was the most publicized- involving 400 white vigilantes targeted a Filipino dance club, beating many and killing one. The California state legislature responded by amending anti-miscegenation laws, prohibiting white-Filipino marriages, similar to the laws in 12 other U.S. states.

In 1953, the Supreme Court ruled in favor of union member Ernesto Mangaoang, who was jailed along with 30 other Alaskeros over communist implications, and established residency rights for thousands of Filipino Americans who entered the U.S. before the Philippines gained their independence in 1946.

== The Great Depression ==
Wages for low-skilled jobs like those in the Alaskan cannery deteriorated after the stock market crash in 1929, in the onset of the Great Depression. Filipino students made up a large part of the cannery workers and were among those in the group that were hit the hardest, having to take up seasonal jobs elsewhere that left little time for classes or even no time at all for school. Luckily, because of the strong sense of community in the Filipino culture, many Alaskeros were able to rely on their traditional system of mutual aid to help pull them through these hard times. Explained by a Filipino scholar, " a Filipino can expect help and protection from his family and kin group, [but] he also has obligations to them." Americans were constantly worried about losing their jobs, and many people who would otherwise works together in groups competed with each other over jobs and security. In 1935, the Welch Bill was funded with $300,000 to repatriate Filipinos- offering to send them back to the Philippines free of charge should they volunteer to go back. Only 5% of Filipinos took up the offer. The ones that remained had their legal status changed by the U.S. government, through the Tydings-McDuffie Act, from nationals to aliens, rendering them exempt from any sort of government aid. This action also limited immigration of Filipinos to 50 per year. This did not restrict them from being able to serve in the U.S. military, or even being called up under the draft in 1942. These restrictions on immigration were dissolved in 1952 with the introduction of the McCarran-Walter Act, which also provided for the nonquota of immigration for the Filipino-Americans' relatives. Filipinos made up the second largest group of immigrants after Mexicans by 1975.

== Unionization ==
Economic decline and a volatile work environment led Alaskeros to unionize and stand up for their rights. The Cannery Workers and Farm Laborer Union was created on June 19, 1933, in Seattle, representing Filipino laborers in Alaska's canneries. Shortly after, CWFLU was chartered as Local 18527 by the American Federation of Labor (AFL). By 1937, CWFLU had integrated with the United Cannery, Agricultural, Packinghouse, and Allied Workers of America (UCAPAW) under the Congress of Industrial Organizations (CIO), becoming UCAPAWA-CIO Local 7, turning into Local 37 of the International Longshoremen and Warehousemen Union (ILWU) by the summer of 1950.

In the beginning, the CWFLU was very slow to unite the Filipino community of laborers in the canneries. It wasn't until two union leaders were murdered in 1936 did Filipinos rally behind the union for higher wages, better hours, and sanitary working conditions for its members. By 1938, the contract system was eliminated, and from that point on, hiring for the canneries was done through the union hall. When WWII started, union activity was limited to Filipino workers, while the internment of Japanese workers was brought about. Many of the cannery workers were enlisting in the military or finding jobs in defense industries, while governmental emergency controls banned strikes and initiated a wage freeze. Another wave of immigrants arrived at the canneries in the 1970s, and a separate organization was established called the Alaska Cannery Workers Association (ACWA). Local 37 was reformed, and by 1980, reformers had gained control of the union, which was changed to IBU/ILWU, Region 37 in 1987, which was actually a merging of the Longshoremen's Union and the Inland Boatmen's Union of the Pacific.

== See also ==
- Filipinos in Alaska
