= Los Angeles Port Police Association =

Police union

- Founded: 1993
- Location: United States
- Key people: Nathaniel Blair
- Affiliations: International Longshore and Warehouse Union

The Los Angeles Port Police Association, Inc (LAPPA) is the official employees organization of Port police officers. The Association was incorporated on January 5, 1993.

The purpose of the police association is to represent its active members in employment relations and matters of working conditions with the City of Los Angeles. Additionally, LAPPA is actively involved in supporting and promoting the surrounding communities of San Pedro and Wilmington.

In furtherance of its goals, the Association is an affiliate member of the International Longshore and Warehouse Union as local 65. The ILWU represents 42,000 members in over 60 local unions in the states of California, Washington, Oregon, Alaska and Hawaii.

As of December 2005, and together with the Los Angeles Police Command Officers Association, the Los Angeles Port Police Association was one of the few unions to be up-to-date with its financial reports to the State of California.

The Los Angeles Port Police Association did not file returns with the Internal Revenue Service for three years in a row, and the Internal Revenue Service revoked its 501(c)(5) tax-exempt status on October 15, 2010.

On October 1, 2023, the ILWU filed for Chapter 11 bankruptcy, stating it can no longer afford to keep fighting claims by ICTSI.
