= Archie Brown (union leader) =

American Communist union leader (1911–1990)

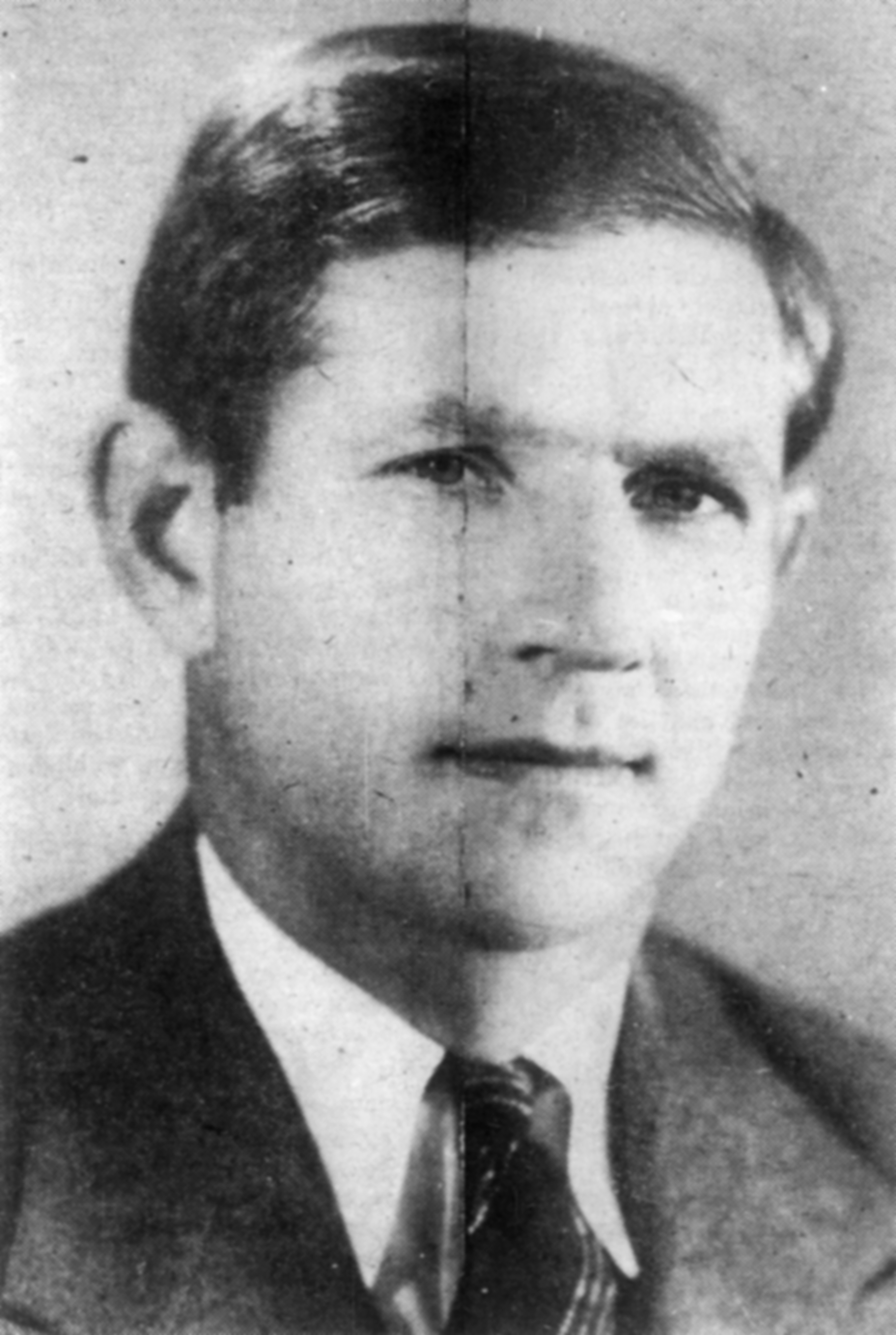
- Brown c. 1959
- Born: March 5, 1911; Sioux City, Iowa, U.S.
- Died: November 23, 1990 (aged 79); San Francisco, California, U.S.
- Military career
- Allegiance: Spanish Republic; United States
- Branch: International Brigades; United States Army
- Service years: 1938; 1945–1946
- Rank: Battalion Commissar; Private First Class
- Units: The "Abraham Lincoln" XV International Brigade; 76th Infantry Division
- Conflicts: Spanish Civil War; Battle of the Ebro; World War II; Western Front; Battle of the Bulge; American occupation of Germany
- Known for: United States v. Brown
- Political party: Communist Party USA

Archie Brown (March 5, 1911 – November 23, 1990) was an American longshore worker and union organizer for the International Longshore and Warehouse Union, active in San Francisco. An open communist, Brown was the defendant in the landmark US Supreme Court case United States v. Brown, which overturned a provision of the Landrum-Griffin Act barring communists from holding leadership positions in labor unions. The Supreme Court ruled in his favor, overturning his previous conviction.

== Early life ==
Archie Brown was born in Sioux City, Iowa, in 1911. His parents, Nathan and Sarah Brown, were Russian Jewish immigrants, and his father was a Teamster. At age 13, Brown followed his father to Oakland, California, via train hopping and found a job selling newspapers. After organizing a strike with his fellow newspaper sellers, Brown became acquainted with the Trade Union Education League (TUEL) and joined the Young Communist League (YCL) in 1929.

== Organizing activities ==
=== Great Depression ===
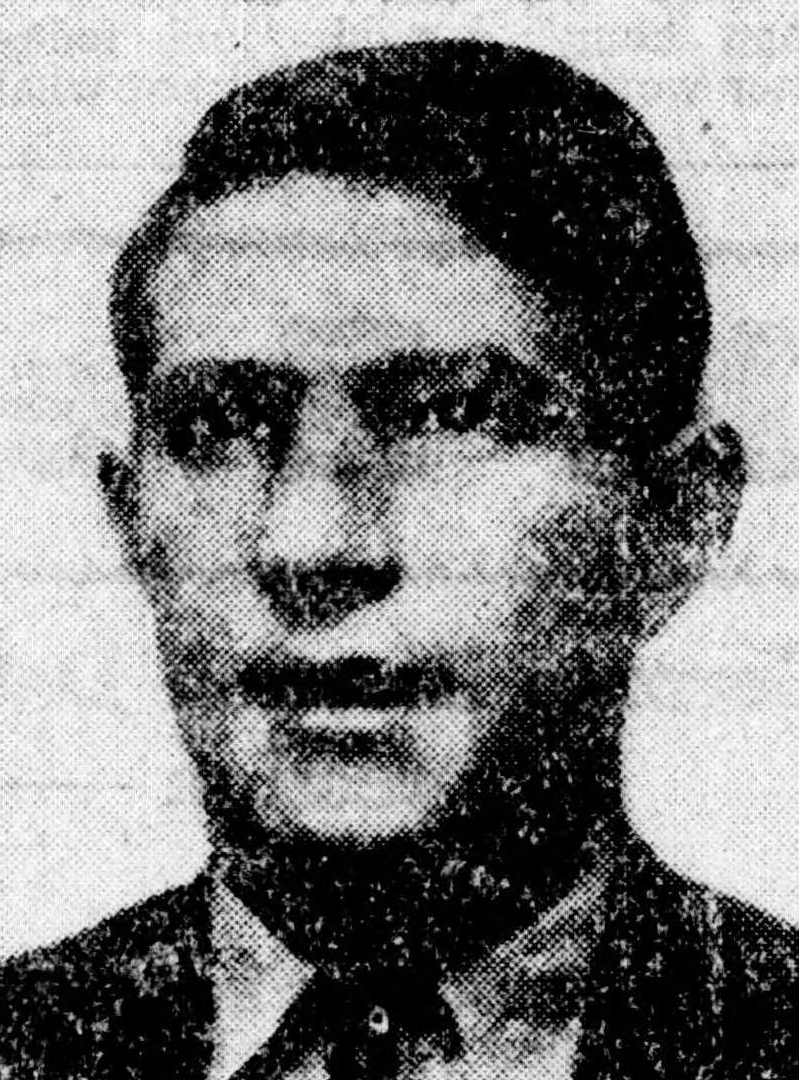
Brown c. 1934

Brown became an organizer in the YCL, TUEL, and the Communist Party (CPUSA). In 1934, Brown was arrested at a YCL event and charged with "disturbing the peace." He served a three month sentence, most of which overlapped with the 1934 West Coast Waterfront Strike. After his release from prison, Brown became a longshore worker and joined the International Longshoremen's Association, which was the predecessor of the ILWU on the west coast of the United States, as part of CPUSA's shift away from its strategy of dual unionism.

Brown first ran for public office as the Communist Party candidate for California State Treasurer in 1934. He then ran for State Assembly in 1936, polling over 9% of the vote against incumbent Republican Kennett B. Dawson. Brown later ran for Congress in California's 4th district in 1940 and 1942, for San Francisco Board of Supervisors in 1939, 1941, 1959, and 1961, and as the Communist Party's write-in candidate for Governor of California in 1946, receiving 22,606 votes (0.88% of the vote) in the last race.

=== Spanish Civil War and World War II ===
In 1938, after being denied a passport by the US government, Brown stowed away on a ship to France and traveled to Spain to join the Abraham Lincoln Brigade. He participated in the Ebro Offensive and took part in the final Republican retreats. In December 1938, Brown sailed back to New York from France.

During World War II, Brown enlisted in the US Army and was sent to Europe in early 1945. He fought in the Battle of the Bulge with the 76th Infantry Division. He returned home in 1946.

=== Red Scare ===
After returning home from the war, Brown became CPUSA's trade union director in the state of California. Advised by CPUSA leadership, Brown spent the first half of the 1950's in hiding due to repression against communists in the United States. In 1955, he resigned his position as trade union director and resumed his longshore work.

=== United States v. Brown ===
In the late 1950's, Brown was elected to the executive board of the International Longshore and Warehouse Union, Local 10 (San Francisco). In 1961, he was arrested and charged with violating section 504 of the Landrum-Griffin Act, which barred communists from holding leadership positions in labor unions. He was convicted in 1963. After the US 9th Circuit Court of Appeals ruled in his favor, his case was brought before the Supreme Court. In 1965, the Court ruled in Brown's favor and found that section 504 constituted a bill of attainder and was therefore unconstitutional.

== Later life ==
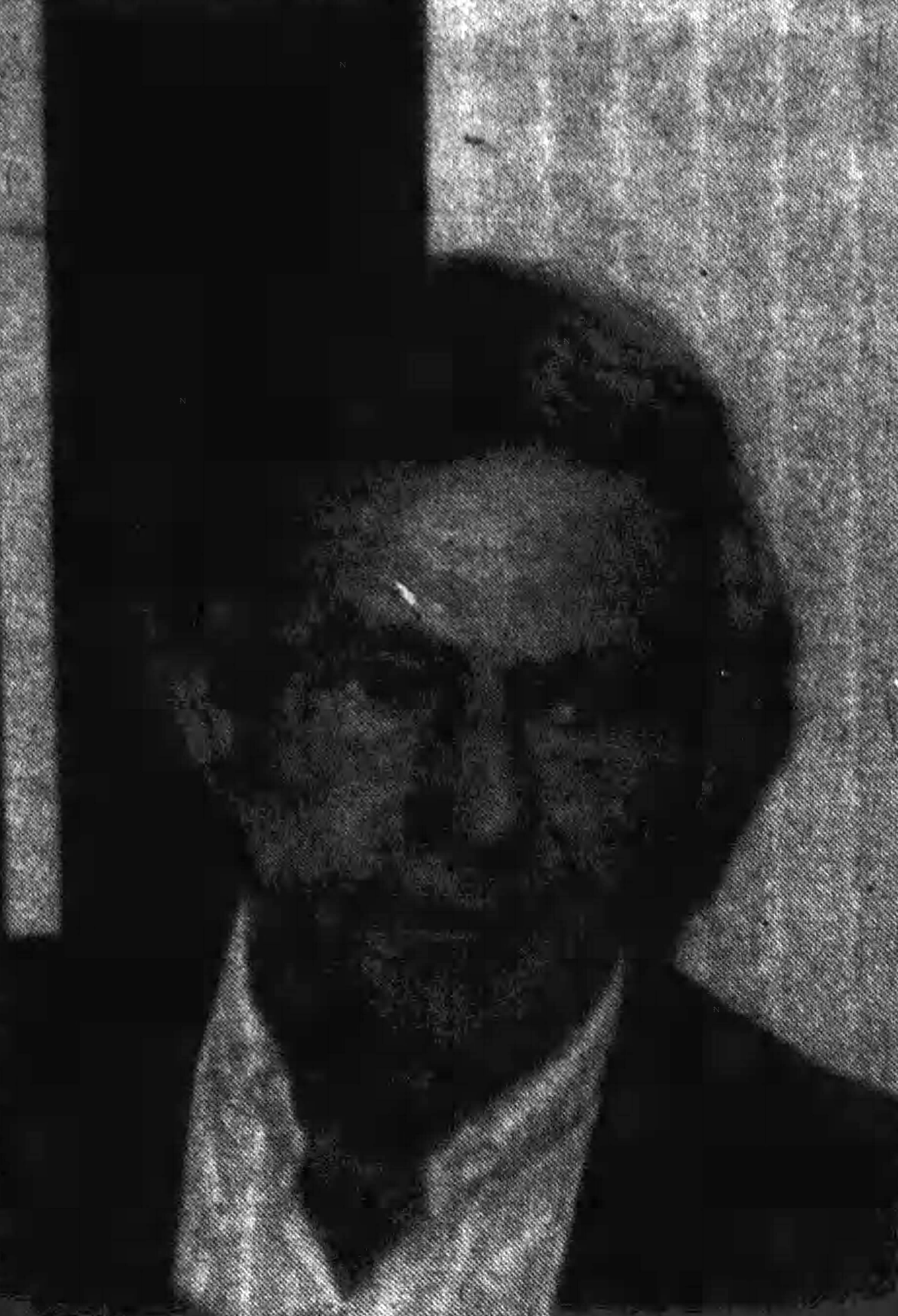
Brown in 1974

Brown continued working as a longshore worker until his retirement in 1976. He remained involved in left-wing causes, including supporting the Sandinistas in Nicaragua and opposing the dictatorship of Augusto Pinochet in Chile. Brown died on November 23, 1990 at age 79 from cancer.
