= United States v. Brown =

1965 US Supreme Court Case on politics of Unions

- Supreme Court of the United States

Argued March 29, 1965 Decided June 7, 1965
- Full case name: United States v. Brown
- Citations: 381 U.S. 437 (more)

Holding
- The Landrum-Griffin Act barred communists from being elected trade union leaders, which constituted a bill of attainder and was therefore unconstitutional

Court membership
- Chief Justice Earl Warren Associate Justices Hugo Black · William O. Douglas; Tom C. Clark · John M. Harlan II; William J. Brennan Jr. · Potter Stewart; Byron White · Arthur Goldberg

Case opinions
- Majority: Warren
- Dissent: White, joined by Clark, Harlan, Stewart

Laws applied
- Landrum-Griffin Act, Bill of Attainder Clause

United States v. Brown 381 U.S. 437 (1965) was a decision of the US Supreme Court that upheld the rights of communists to hold leadership positions in labor unions.

== Background ==
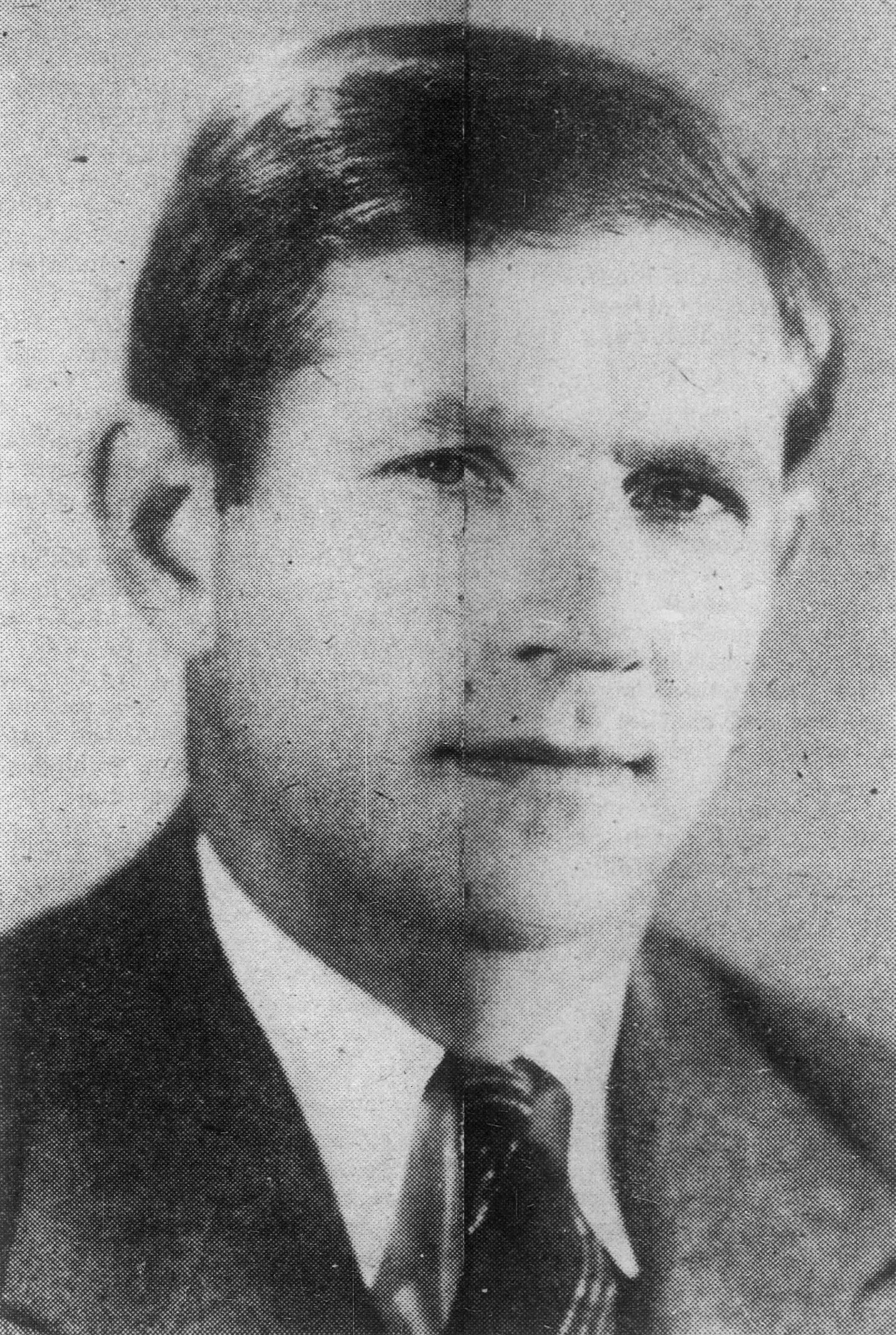
Archie Brown

The Landrum-Griffin Act (LMRDA) was a piece of McCarthy-era legislation meant to regulate the internal affairs of labor unions, passed in 1959. Under section 504, members of the Communist Party and convicted felons were barred from holding union office.

Archie Brown was elected to the executive board of the International Longshore and Warehouse Union, Local 10 (San Francisco) in the late 1950s. Brown was an open member of the Communist Party and had been the Party's candidate for various government offices in California. In 1961, Brown was arrested and charged with violating section 504 of the LMRDA. He was convicted in 1963, and appealed his decision to the US Court of Appeals for the Ninth Circuit, which held section 504 violated the First Amendment and Fifth Amendment to the United States Constitution. After the appeals court ruled in his favor, the decision was appealed to the Supreme Court.

== Ruling ==
In 1965, the Supreme Court ruled 5-4 in favor of Brown. In a decision authored by Chief Justice Earl Warren, section 504 of the LMRDA was found to constitute a bill of attainder that was unconstitutional under Article I, Section 9, Clause 3 of the Constitution. The Court did not address whether it was in violation of the First or Fifth Amendment.
