= Bullet Marasigan =

Filipino-American social worker and activist

Violeta Marasigan
- Born: January 4, 1939; Philippines
- Died: April 18, 2000 (aged 61); San Francisco, CA
- Other names: Bullet X
- Occupation: Social worker
- Spouse: Pete Marasigan
- Children: 5

Violeta Marasigan (1939-21 April 2000), better known by her nickname "Bullet X", or more plainly "Bullet", was a Filipino-American social worker and activist best known for her key role in the International Hotel eviction protests which became an important incident in Filipino American history; as well as her resistance against and eventual imprisonment under the dictatorship of Ferdinand Marcos; and for helping establish the Filipino feminist organization GABRIELA and the released-political-detainees group SELDA. She also did advocacy work focused on education for Filipino immigrant children, equal military benefits for Filipino American World War II veterans, and ending racial slurs against Filipino women on American television.

In recognition of her years of service to the Bay Area community, she was given the Unsung Heroes Award by KQED Public Broadcasting Co. in 1995. In November 2019 hers was one of eleven names which were added to the Wall of Remembrance of the Philippines' Bantayog ng mga Bayani, which recognizes the heroes and martyrs that fought the Marcos dictatorship.

== Early life and education ==
Violeta Marasigan was born in the Philippines, but migrated to the United States where she studied at San Francisco State College.

== Early Activism and the I-Hotel demolition ==
Soon after graduation, she was hired as a social worker for the Multi-Service Center of the United Filipino Association (UFA), where her job specifically involved serving a number of retirees whom she fondly called manongs (an ilocano term of endearment for elder men) at the I-Hotel in the old Manilatown community of San Francisco, California.

Marasigan was soon surprised to discover that these manongs were receiving only about half of their social security benefits every month. In response, she lobbied their caseworkers to make sure that the retirees receive their full benefits every month.

Soon, plans to demolish the International Hotel were revealed, and Marasigan played a key role in the protests. Although the demolition eventually pushed through, the incident became an important moment in Filipino American history, contributing to the growth of Filipino American consciousness.

== Activism in the Philippines (1971-1988) ==
When Marasigan and her and husband Pete came back to the Philippines in 1971, the country was in turmoil after Ferdinand Marcos' unprecedented spending to assure his win in the 1969 presidential elections triggered an economic collapse and massive social unrest. A year later, Marcos would declare Martial Law. Pete and Bullet Marasigan quickly got involved in activism against the Marcos regime.

Bullet took up work with the family ministry National Council of Churches of the Philippines, and in that capacity, became well known for being present every time the council participated in a protest. The Marasigan home was raided by the regime's military forces in 1981, and Bullet was jailed for almost a year in Camp Crame under charges of subversion.

Journalist Ma Ceres P. Doyo of the Philippine Daily Inquirer later recounted an anecdote which humorously claimed

"the reason Bullet was released was that the barrage of words and laughter (that was subversive) she relentlessly unleashed became too much for her jailers."

=== Organizations ===
Between returning to the Philippines in 1971 and returning to the US in 1988, Bullet became one of the founders of the feminist coalition GABRIELA, and also helped organize SELDA, an association of released political detainees. Other organizations she co-founded include Asian Women in Theology (AWIT), and Kaiba, a women's political party.

== Return to the US and continued activism ==
In 1988, the Marasigans returned to California, and Bullet continued to in her activist activities. She took up a post as district-wide social worker of the Veterans’ Equity Center, as counselor and social worker for the West Bay Filipino Multi-Services and Asian American Recovery Services. She also participated in the campaign to re-open the Filipino Education Center.

== Death ==
Bullet Marasigan died as a result of a car accident on the morning of Tuesday, April 18, 2000.

== Legacy ==
In recognition of her years of service to the Bay Area community, she was given the Unsung Heroes Award by KQED Public Broadcasting Co. in 1995. In November 2019 hers will be among the eleven names which will be added to the Wall of Remembrance of the Philippines' Bantayog ng Mga Bayani, which recognizes the heroes and martyrs that fought the Marcos dictatorship.

A few months after her death, a resolution was filed to have Phelan Avenue in San Francisco renamed as Violeta "Bullet" Marasigan Avenue. The avenue was eventually renamed "Frida Kahlo Way" in 2018.

== See also ==
- Bantayog ng mga Bayani
- Silme Domingo
- Gene Viernes
