= Gene Viernes =

Murdered Filipino American labor activist

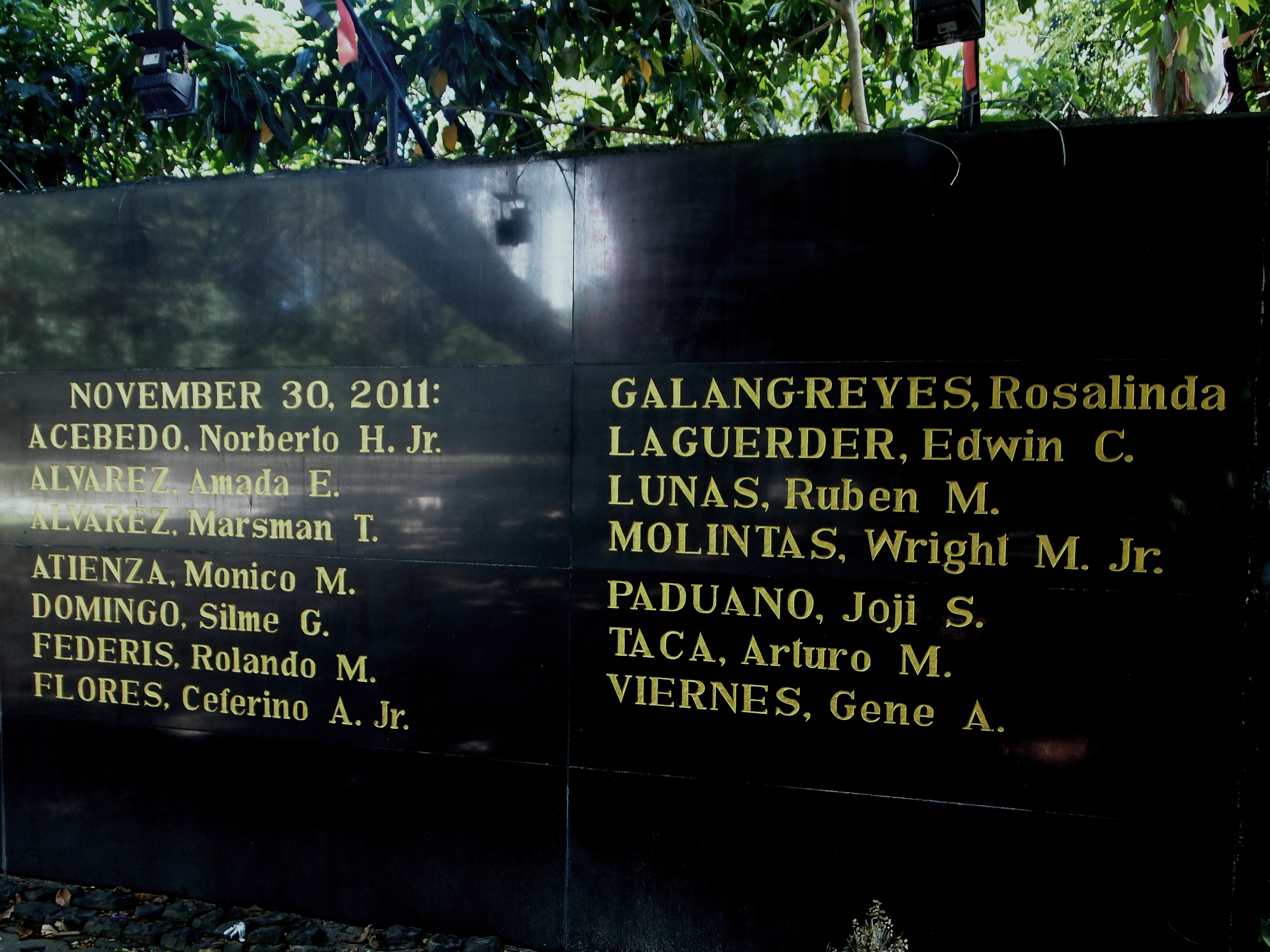
- Detail of the Wall of Remembrance at the Bantayog ng mga Bayani, showing names from the 2011 batch of Bantayog Honorees, including that of Gene Viernes.
- Born: August 16, 1951; Wapato, Washington, U.S.
- Died: June 1, 1981 (aged 29); Seattle, Washington, U.S.
- Occupation: Labor activist

Gene Allen Viernes (August 16, 1951 – June 1, 1981) was a Filipino American labor activist based in Seattle, known for his efforts to reform Local 37 of the International Longshore and Warehouse Union (ILWU).

Viernes was active in promoting union democracy and labor rights for Filipino and Asian American cannery workers in Alaska and the U.S. Pacific Northwest. Alongside fellow activist Silme Domingo, he advocated against corruption within the union and campaigned for better working conditions and racial equality within the canning industry.

On June 1, 1981, Viernes and Domingo were murdered in Seattle. Subsequent investigations and legal proceedings established that the killings were carried out in retaliation for their activism and opposition to the regime of Philippine president Ferdinand Marcos and his wife, Imelda Marcos.

In 1989, a U.S. federal court found the Marcoses legally responsible for the murders, ruling in favor of the victims’ families and awarding damages.

Viernes was born in Wapato, Washington, in 1952 to a family of ten children. His father was a Filipino immigrant, and his mother was white. Viernes grew up on a farm and did seasonal labor in agriculture and in canneries in Alaska. Viernes met Silme Domingo through his cannery work and became involved in reform efforts in the Cannery and Farm Laborers Union (ILWU Local 37) and the Democratic Union of Filipinos (KDP). On June 1, 1981, Viernes and Domingo were shot by two gunmen in their office at the Local 37 hall in Pioneer Square. Viernes died instantly, but Domingo was able to chase the attackers out of the hall and named them to a firefighter. Domingo died from his wounds the next day. Family and friends established the Committee for Justice for Domingo and Viernes and fought a ten-year legal battle, in which they successfully proved that the murders had been arranged by Local 37 president Tony Baruso on behalf of the Marcos regime.

Viernes and Domingo were among the 14 Marcos Martial Law era martyrs to be honored at the Bantayog ng mga Bayani memorial wall on November 30, 2011.

On September 29, 2004 the Seattle Housing Authority dedicated a new apartment building in the Chinatown-International District and named it the Domingo Viernes Apartments in honor of Domingo and Viernes.

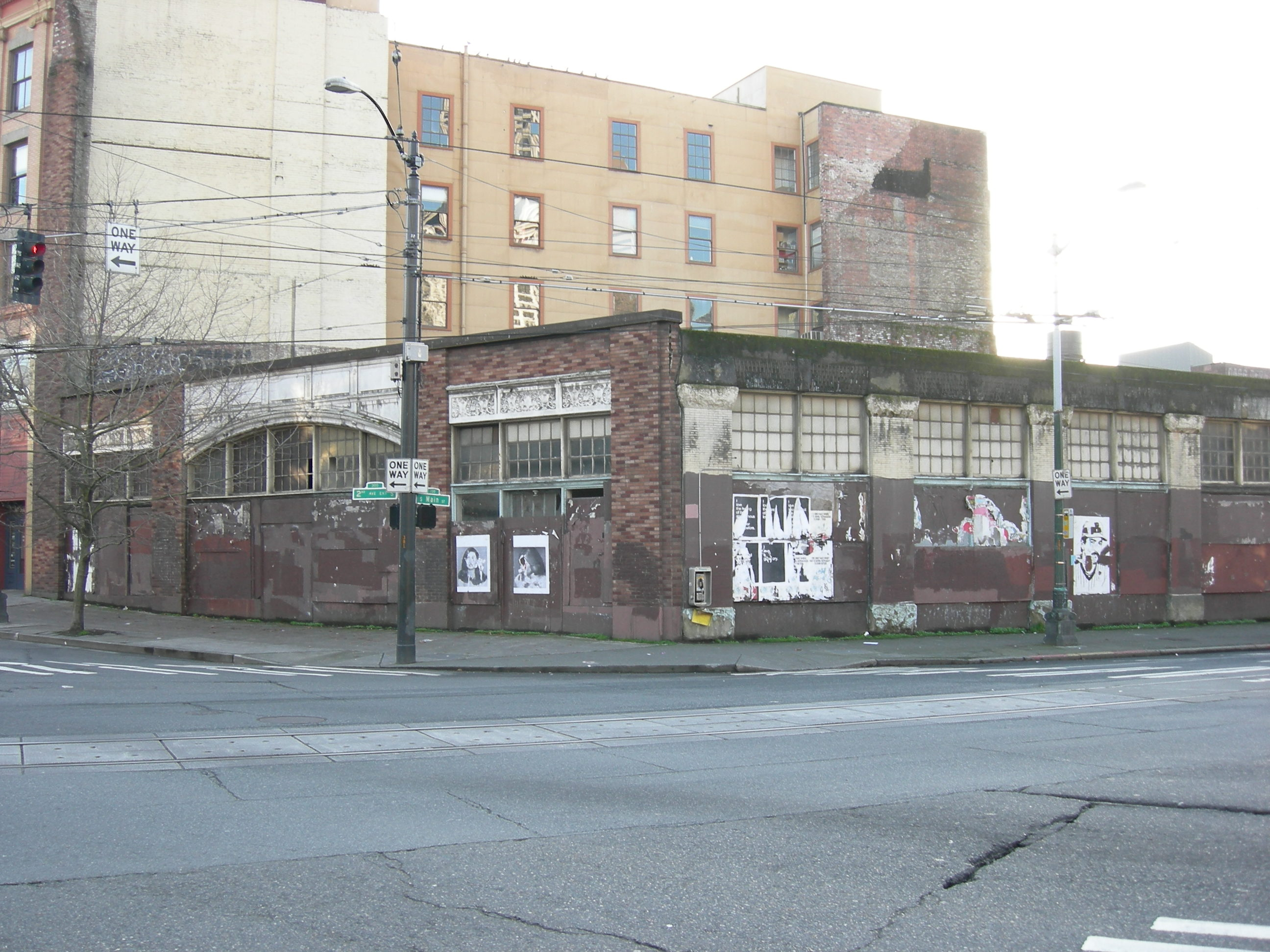
The Local 37 office in Pioneer Square where Silme Domingo and Gene Viernes were shot in 1981

== See also ==
- Martial Law in the Philippines under Ferdinand Marcos
- Silme Domingo
- Violeta Marasigan
- Cindy Domingo
