= Tyree Scott Freedom School =

Program in Seattle, Washington, USA

The Tyree Scott Freedom School (Freedom School) is an educational program in Seattle, Washington, with a curriculum on social justice issues and anti-racist community organizing in Seattle. The project also holds a monthly gathering of anti-racist educators, whose goal is to end institutional racism in the education system.

== Purpose ==
The South Seattle Emerald said the school "focuses on community organizing, learning a deeper analysis about racism and systems of oppression, and undoing racism in our society." The school's training method, "power analysis," demonstrates how institutions affect people of color. Its purpose is raising students' consciousness of social justice issues, to create young anti-racist community organizers, according to Dustin Washington, Community Justice Program Director (AFSC).

The International Examiner reported the school "validates student experiences with racism and ties it with the structural context that students can see reflected widely in enduring racial gaps in food security and income, and racial dis-proportionality in school discipline and juvenile detention."

Most Tyree Scott Freedom School students are enrolled in the Seattle Public School District, which is the largest public school system in Washington State, having 45,572 students enrolled for the 2008–2009 school year. Of those students 43.0% are White and 57.0% are non-white. 35.8% of students do not live with both parents, 39.2% are eligible for free or reduced-lunch, 23.7% of students are Limited English and Equal English, and 14% of all students received special education services. These numbers are based on enrollment in 12 regular high schools, 10 middle schools, 9 K-8 schools, 58 elementary schools and 15 self-contained alternative schools including special education programs.

== History ==
=== American Friends Service Committee ===
Freedom Schools were started in multiple states in the Civil Rights era, based on Charles Cobb's proposal for a nation-wide network of Freedom Schools in 1963. In 1964, activists had started 30 freedom schools in Mississippi highlighting racial inequalities in the state's educational system. Seattle also established temporary freedom schools during the 1966 Seattle school boycott, which protested segregation in Seattle public schools. Organizers arranged eight freedom schools for students to learn about civil rights and African American history, topics not covered well in the public school curriculum.

In the late 1990s, due to the efforts of the People's Institute in Seattle, the City of Seattle Undoing Institutional Racism Group, and their allies, there was renewed interest in challenging racial disparities within the education system. In 2001, the staff the American Friends Service Committee (AFSC) along with The People's Institute of Survival and Beyond, established the Seattle Freedom School.

Two local groups which emerged were Youth Undoing Institutional Racism (YUIR), workshop's activist arm, and Taking Care of Kids is Power. The American Friends Service Committee (AFSC) was among the community organizations that mentored YUIR, which conducted regular sessions with youth on a variety of issues relevant to their lives. YUIR and Taking Care of Kids is Power tackled the lack of multicultural curriculum, and racial disparities in discipline and achievement in the Seattle Public Schools. Youth trained themselves and testified to City Councilmembers and at School Board Meetings.

=== Seattle Freedom School, 2001–2003 ===
These early efforts built momentum, and AFSC launched the first Seattle Freedom School in 2001.

Dustin Washington and Katie Wepplo, Program Assistant (AFSC), served as the primary organizers.

The 2001 Seattle Freedom School was a five-day organizing workshop which taught about 20 youth and young adults about racism, sexism, homophobia, and social justice.

=== Tyree Scott Freedom School, 2003–present ===
In 2003, Freedom School was named in honor of the community organizer Tyree Scott, who died that year. For five decades Scott worked as a community organizer in Seattle, fighting discriminatory hiring practices, breaking through racial barriers in the trade unions, starting worker-to-worker programs which linked the struggle of American workers to workers overseas, and co-founding the Northwest Labor and Employment Law Office (LELO). In 1970 the American Friends Service Committee gave Tyree Scott financial support to start a new community-based organization that organized workers of color to fight discrimination in the unions and in the construction trades, called the United Construction Workers Association.

The school's lead organizer Senait Brown said, "We’re not here to teach kids what to think, but how to think... Most education doesn't provide kids with a racial or structural analysis of the world they’re living in, so they just accept what they’re told."

According to The Seattle Times, funding agencies include AFSC, Youth Undoing Institutional Racism, and The People's Institute for Survival and Beyond Northwest.

== Curriculum ==
The Tyree Scott Freedom School workshops are offered during winter and summer breaks and on several weekends. Curriculum follows in the footsteps of the Freedom Schools of the 1960s and learns from current Freedom School programs in other cities around the country. Whereas civil rights era Freedom Schools dealt primarily with legalized segregation, Tyree Scott Freedom School focuses on addressing the culture of institutional racism. Seattle Post-Intelligencer reported, "At the core of the institute training is a method called 'power analysis,' an examination of how institutional structures such as schools, housing and the prison system affect people of color."

Curriculum also incorporates understandings of internalized racial oppression developed by the People's Institute, based on Joy Leary's research on post-traumatic slavery, and Edwin Nichols' model for understanding cultural racism. Curriculum is based around the Undoing Racism principles of the People's Institute including learning from history, sharing culture, developing leadership, maintaining accountability, networking, understanding power and gate keeping, and undoing internalized racial oppression. Participants analyze why people are poor; develop power analyses; define racism; learn principles of organizing; learn African American, Native American, Latino and Asian history; and discuss intersections of racism with sexism and heterosexism (homophobia).

Freedom School students participate in various field trips, such as a historical tour of Seattle's Central District, the Wing Luke Museum, El Centro de la Raza, and the Tulalip reservation.t.
