= Silme Domingo =

Labor activist

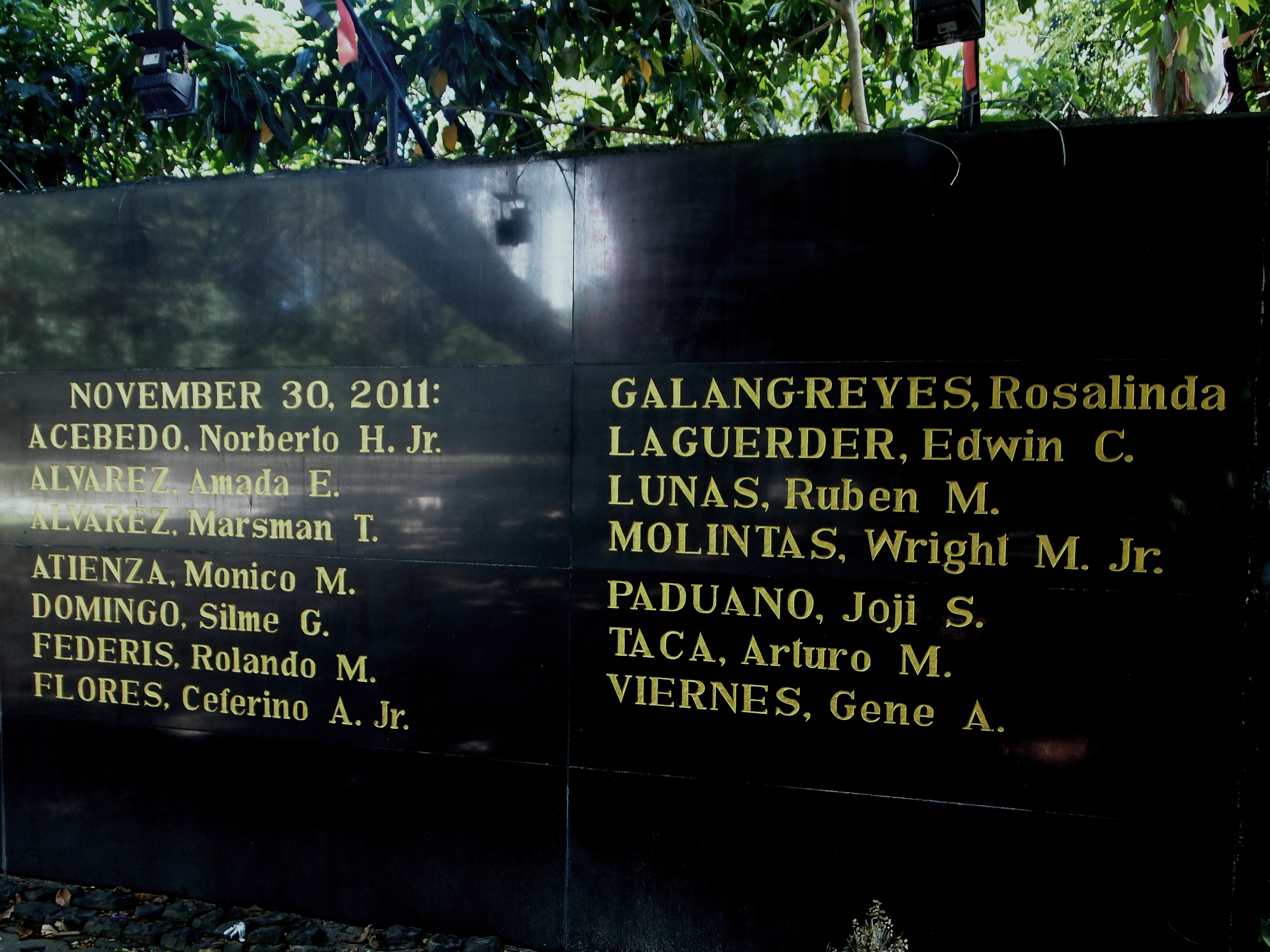
- Detail of the Wall of Remembrance at the Bantayog ng mga Bayani, showing names from the 2011 batch of Bantayog Honorees, including that of Silme Domingo.
- Born: January 25, 1952; Killeen, Texas, U.S.
- Died: June 2, 1981 (aged 29); Seattle, Washington, U.S.
- Occupation: Labor activist
- Spouse: Terri Mast
- Children: 2

Silme Domingo (January 25, 1952 – June 2, 1981) was a Filipino American labor activist. With Gene Viernes, he was murdered in Seattle on June 1, 1981, while attempting to reform the Local 37 of the International Longshore and Warehouse Union (ILWU).

== Biography ==
Silme Domingo was born in Killeen, Texas, on January 25, 1952, one of five children of Nemesio and Adelina Domingo. His family relocated to Seattle in 1960, where he grew up. Domingo attended Ballard High School and later graduated with honors from the University of Washington, where he became active in student activism.

During the 1970s, he participated in efforts to preserve Seattle's International District. In 1974, he joined the Union of Democratic Filipinos and helped establish its Seattle chapter, which organized the first local protest against the Marcos dictatorship in the Philippines.

Domingo co-founded the Alaska Cannery Workers Association, a civil rights organization that pursued legal action against discriminatory practices in Alaska canneries, where Filipino American, Anglo American, and Indigenous workers were often segregated and treated unequally. Together with fellow organizer and close friend Gene Viernes, Domingo was later elected as an officer in Seattle's Cannery Workers and Farm Laborers Union, Local 37, running on a platform promoting union democracy and anti-corruption.

He was survived by his two children, Ligaya and Kalayaan.

== Assassination ==
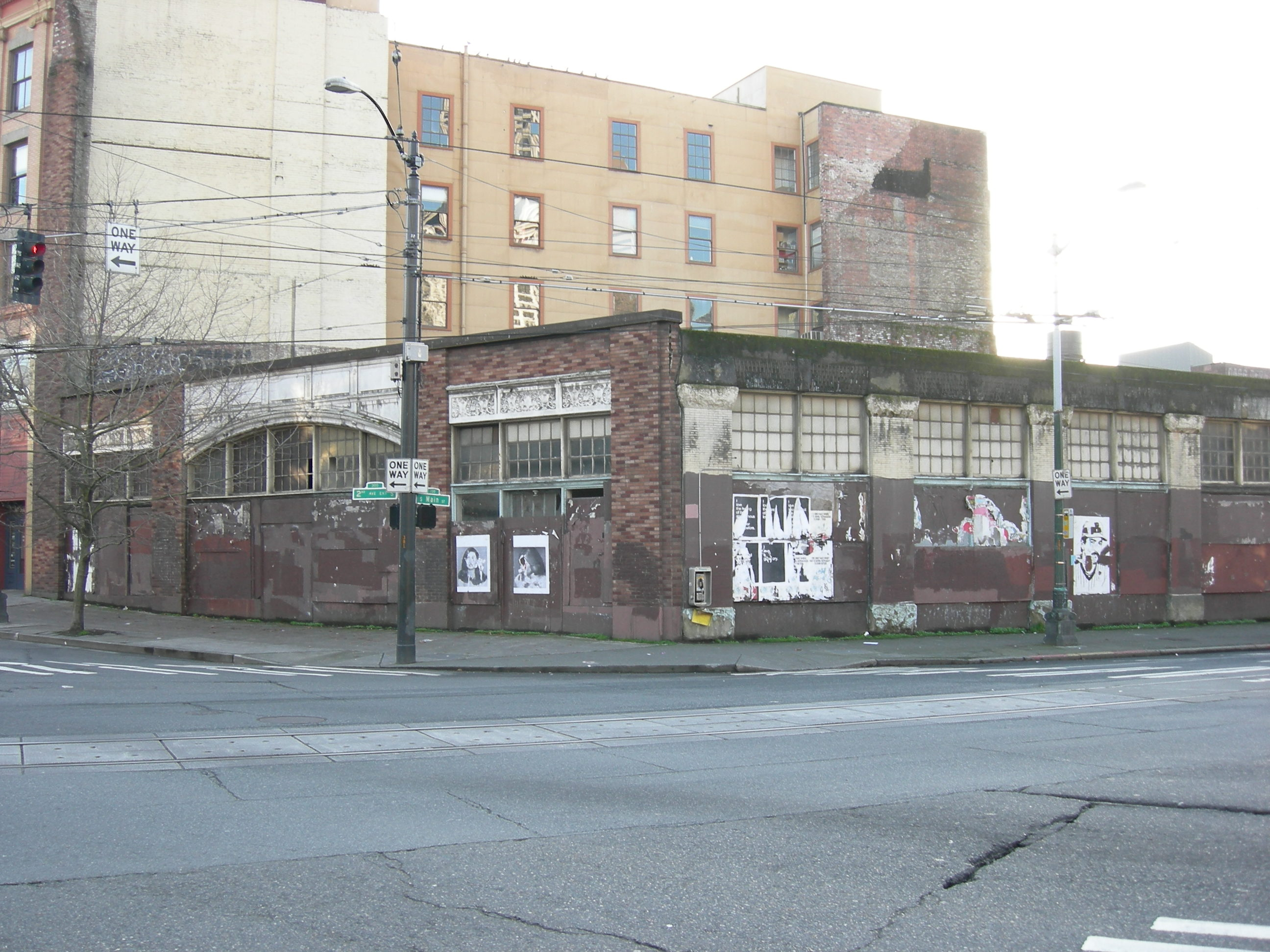
The Local 37 office in Pioneer Square where Silme Domingo and Gene Viernes were shot in 1981

Silme Domingo and Gene Viernes were officers and reformers in Local 37 of the International Longshore and Warehouse Union (ILWU). They were elected on a reform platform as officers of ILWU Local 37 — to end corruption and bribery in the union. Domingo and Viernes were both shot on the afternoon of June 1, 1981, inside the Local 37 offices in Pioneer Square in downtown Seattle. Viernes died on the spot. Domingo, shot four times in the abdomen, managed to struggle to the street. The union hall was only a block from a fire station; two firefighters arrived within minutes, and Domingo managed to tell them the names of the killers, "Guloy and Ramil".

Taken to Harborview Medical Center, Domingo underwent multiple operations, but died the next day. Pompeyo Benito Guloy and Jimmy Bulosan Ramil, both members of Local 37 and of the Tulisan gang, were found guilty of first degree murder and sentenced to life in prison. During the investigation, the murders were further linked to Fortunato “Tony” Dictado, leader of the Tulisans.

The murders were originally thought to be an isolated act of violence, but friends and family organized a Committee for Justice for Domingo and Viernes (CJDV) eventually found links between the murders to Philippine President Ferdinand Marcos and his wife Imelda, who had ordered the murders in retaliation for the victims’ anti-Marcos organizing. In 1989, and a federal jury agreed with the CJDV, finding Marcos guilty of the murders.

In 1991, former Local 37 president Constantine “Tony” Baruso (1928-2008) — a supporter of the Marcos regime — was also found guilty of aggravated first-degree murder in the death of Viernes but not Domingo.

== Legacy ==
In 2011, the Inlandboatmen's Union, Region 37, created an annual scholarship to honor the memory of Domingo and Viernes. The scholarship is available via the Harry Bridges Center for Labor Studies, University of Washington.

Silme Domingo and his fellow Local 37 labor activist Gene Viernes were among the 14 Marcos Martial Law era martyrs to be honored at the Bantayog ng mga Bayani memorial wall on November 30, 2011.

Since 1982, an annual event associated with the organization LELO - Legacy of Leadership, Equality and Organizing is held in Seattle to honor Silme Domingo and Gene Viernes and an award is presented to an organization or individual who exemplifies the values and principles of the two.

On September 29, 2004 the Seattle Housing Authority dedicated a new apartment building in the Chinatown-International District and named it the Domingo Viernes Apartments in honor of Domingo and Viernes.

== See also ==
- History of Filipino Americans
- Wards Cove Packing Co. v. Atonio
- Gene Viernes
- Violeta Marasigan
- Cindy Domingo

== Bibliography ==
- Chew, Ron (2012). Remembering Silme Domingo and Gene Viernes: the legacy of Filipino American labor activism. Seattle, WA: Alaskero Foundation / University of Washington Press. ISBN 9780295991900. OCLC 768041919.
- Domingo, Ligaya Rene (2010). Building a Movement: Filipino American Union and Community Organizing in Seattle in the 1970s. Berkeley, CA, US: University of California, Berkeley. OCLC 769458380.
- Withey, Michael (2018). Summary Execution: The Seattle Assassinations of Silme Domingo and Gene Viernes. WildBlue Press. ISBN 9781947290372. OCLC 1021223589.
