= Tyree Scott =

American labor leader and activist

Tyree Scott (1940–2003) was a US labor leader and civil rights activist deeply involved in many minority workers’ and equal opportunity organizations.

Scott was born in Hearne (Wharton County). He grew up as an electrician in Texas and moved to Seattle in 1966 and became a leader in the Central Contractors Association. This organization of minority workers led many peaceful demonstrations against discriminatory hiring practices in Seattle’s construction industry in the summer and fall of 1969. Through the protests, the issue of discriminatory employment was noted by the American Friends Service Committee. After investigating the situation, the American Friends Service Committee approached Scott and the leadership of the Central Contractors Association and proposed a new community-based organization that would organize minority workers to fight discrimination in the unions and in the construction trades. The United Construction Workers Association was founded in 1970 with financial support from the American Friends Service Committee. Tyree Scott was a founding member and worked intensively within the Association, first as a paid staff member and then later as a director.

United Construction Workers Association combined community organization, peaceful demonstrations, and legal action to fight workplace discrimination. The Association saw an early victory in the class action suit United States vs. Ironworkers Local 86 et al., in which the United States Department of Justice sued five local unions and apprenticeship and training committees under Title VII of the 1964 Civil Rights Act. In 1970 Judge William J. Lindberg found that there had indeed been racial discrimination in the practices of all institutions named in this case. He ordered wide-ranging relief programs, including quotas for union membership, hiring, and apprenticeship classes and changes in hiring and dispatching procedures.

Scott became less involved in the activities of the United Construction Workers Association in the late seventies, and the organization faded out of existence around 1981. Tyree Scott retired from the electrician’s trade and remained active as a board member for the Labor and Employment Law Office until his death in 2003.

== Legacy ==
In Seattle, a 21-unit apartment building at 4000 MLK Way S was named after Scott. It shares a lot with the Refugee Women's Alliance Center.

A summer program for youth was named after Scott and the civil rights-era freedom schools model: the Tyree Scott Freedom School. It taught social justice awareness and community organizing, and was organized by the American Friends Service Committee.
