= Cannery Workers and Farm Laborers Union, Local 7 =

First Filipino-led union in the United States

The Cannery Workers and Farm Laborers Union, Local 7 was the first Filipino-led union in the United States. Founded in 1933 as the Cannery Workers and Farm Laborers Union, Local 18257 of the American Federation of Labor (AFL), it represented Alaska salmon cannery workers and farm workers.

In 1937, the union became Cannery Workers and Farm Laborers Union, Local 7 of the United Cannery, Agricultural, Packing, and Allied Workers of America. In 1945, Local 7 became affiliated with the Food, Tobacco, Agricultural, and Allied Workers. In 1951 the union became Local 37 of International Longshore and Warehouse Union, and around 1987 it became Region 37 of IBU/ILWU. The cannery worker membership was majority Filipino American historically, but it also included a number of other nonwhite workers.

== History ==
=== Founding ===
The Seattle-based Cannery Workers' and Farm Laborers' Union was chartered as Local 19257 by the American Federation of Labor on June 19, 1933. Their aim was to represent the primarily Filipino-American laborers who worked in the Alaska salmon canneries.

Filipino Alaskeros had first appeared in the canneries around 1911. As exclusionary immigration laws went into effect in the 1920s, they began replacing Japanese cannery workers, who had in turn been steadily replacing the Chinese cannery workers in the wake of the Chinese Exclusion Act. The Alaska cannery industry had, from its inception in 1878, always been racially segregated. There were two groups, with skilled jobs (machinists, bookkeepers, fishermen, clerks, etc.) performed by white laborers and deskilled jobs performed by nonwhite laborers. Within these deskilled jobs were titles like tinsmith, butcher, slimer, can-tester, and filler.

Asian workers were traditionally recruited through labor contractors who were paid to provide a work crew for the summer canning season. While the contractors were expected to pay the workers' wages and for other expenses, they also had free rein to manage them as they saw fit. This system led to many abuses, including racketeering, wage garnishing, fabricated expenses, institutionalized gambling, unsanitary quarters, and more. It was these harsh working and living conditions, coupled with the Great Depression, from which the movement toward unionization grew. Attempts to unionize in the salmon canneries was neither new, nor unique to the Filipinos. In 1867 and again in 1877, the Chinese employees in the canneries that preceded them had also attempted to organize and strike for better job stability and wages, but with little to no improvement to their working conditions to show for it.

While mostly founded to serve cannery workers, the Local 18257 was also a farm laborers' union, because many Filipinos worked in seasonal agriculture also. Summers were spent in the canneries, winters on the farms, and the rest of the year was usually spent working as domestic house boys. Farm Division organizers attempted to organize workers in Yakima, Kent, Everett, Bainbridge Island, and the White River area, but were often met with harsh opposition from local officials and vigilantes.

The fledgling CWFLU Local 18257 also had to compete with other unions, such as various company unions or contractor-led unions. For example, Japanese American lawyer Clarence Arai led the rival Japanese Cannery Workers Association, and prominent Filipino American contractor Pio De Cano led the Filipino Cannery Workers Association. There was also competition from the left, chiefly from the Fishermen and Cannery Workers' Industrial Union (FCWIU), a rival union sponsored by the Trade Union Unity League in response to the CWFLU's slow approach to combating the issue of contracting. However, the FCWIU was dissolved in 1935 and its supporters eventually joined the CWFLU.

=== Virgil Duyungan ===
As the CWFLU's first president and one of its founding members, Virgil Duyungan was a key leader in the union.

Duyungan, prior to his presidency worked in a number of jobs such as smelting, cooking and as a contractor for agricultural workers in crops such as hops, apples, and peaches. He was also married in Washington state during 1924 and had seven children with Margaret Duyungan Mislang, a white woman born in Seattle to Scottish immigrants who would, after Virgil's death, later marry one of his union colleagues, Cornelio "Joe" Mislang.

As the Union President, Duyungan went to San Francisco in 1934 to attend the National Recovery Act hearing for the Alaskan fish cannery industry. There, he attempted to expose practices of exploitation and corruption in Alaskan canneries. Besides the standard abuses all working Filipinos faced — "no minimum wages, no uniform pay increases, no compensation, no insurance, no medical coverage, no pension plan, and, above all, no collective bargaining" — he also testified to more lurid details of corruption. Along with foremen running gambling rings and selling drugs and alcohol, there was the issue of sex trafficking: "white homosexual boys as young as 14 were recruited and smuggled on board ships bound for Bristol Bay, and typically older homosexual transvestites were hired as prostitutes to service cannery workers". There were, of course, also the more mundane but likewise deeply exploitative issues of long working hours, unpaid overtime, poverty wages, and substandard living quarters.

Virgil made himself a target of those who wanted to maintain the system. On the evening of December 1, 1936, Dunyungan and union secretary Aurelio Simon went to the Gyokku Ken Café, a restaurant partially owned by prominent Japanese contractor George Nishimura that served as their usual location for contractor negotiation meetings. However, they were shot and killed by the nephew of a labor contractor, Placidio Patron, who also died during the shoot-out that night.

After Duyungan's death, the union was more determined than ever to end the contract labor system, and accomplished this after signing an agreement in April 1937 with the salmon cannery owners, outlawing labor agents and labor contractors in the industry. Also, despite this setback the union was able to win a hiring hall.

In November 1937, the union voted Ireneo R. Cabatit in as the new President. He worked closely alongside the union's business agent Conrad Espe, a Norwegian American labor organizer who also had a leading role in steering the union. Under Cabatit and Espe, the usually Fiilipino-centric CWFLU focused on promoting interracial cooperation and ending discrimination in the community.

=== AFL conflict ===
Local 18257 came into conflict with the AFL in 1937 when their parent body, the AFL, attempted to separate the union along racial lines. It recognized an all-Japanese Local organized by Clarence Arai, sowing confusion over who was the industry representative. Local 18257 successfully retained negotiation rights and dispatched its workers in 1937 despite pickets set up by the rival group.

Bitterness toward the AFL resulted from the incident and led to a November 4 vote by the Seattle, Portland, and San Francisco CWFLU Locals to instead affiliate with the United Cannery, Agricultural, Packing, and Allied Workers of America division of the newly formed Congress of Industrial Organizations (UCAPAWA-CIO). All three branches joined, and in Seattle the Local 18257 became the UCAPAWA, Local 7.

Opponents of re-affiliation, led by John Ayamo and called the "defeated candidates party," received the old 18257 charter and challenged Local 7 for the right to represent cannery workers. On May 4, 1938, the issue was settled in Local 7's favor in a National Labor Relations Board (NLRB) supervised election. The industry's representative, Canned Salmon Industry Inc., subsequently recognized the victorious union. Ayamo later formed another AFL union, the Alaska Fish Cannery Workers, under the jurisdiction of the Seafarers International Union.

In 1937 also, the CWFLU merged with a rival, the Filipino Protective Association. I.R. Cabatit was president of the union during the period of rivalry with the AFL. When he was succeeded by Trinidad Rojo in 1939, the CWFLU, Local 7 was on the verge of bankruptcy. It was discovered that officers had been selling membership cards, misappropriating funds and neglecting their duties. Rojo cut expenses and returned the union to a sound financial footing.
