= Wards Cove Packing Co. v. Atonio =

Ward's Cove Packing Co. v. Atonio
- Supreme Court of the United States

Argued January 18, 1989 Decided June 5, 1989
- Full case name: Wards Cove Packing Company, Incorporated, et al. v. Atonio, et al.
- Citations: 490 U.S. 642 (more) 109 S. Ct. 2115; 104 L. Ed. 2d 733; 1989 U.S. LEXIS 2794; 57 U.S.L.W. 4583; 49 Fair Empl. Prac. Cas. (BNA) 1519; 50 Empl. Prac. Dec. (CCH) ¶ 39,021

Case history
- Prior: Reversed and remanded, 827 F.2d 439. Certiorari to the United States Court of Appeal for the Ninth Circuit, granted
- Subsequent: 827 F.2d 439, reversed and remanded.

Holding
- To determine whether a disparate-impact case exists, compare racial composition of the at-issue jobs and the racial composition of the qualified population in the relevant labor market.

Court membership
- Chief Justice William Rehnquist Associate Justices William J. Brennan Jr. · Byron White; Thurgood Marshall · Harry Blackmun; John P. Stevens · Sandra Day O'Connor; Antonin Scalia · Anthony Kennedy

Case opinions
- Majority: White, joined by Rehnquist, O'Connor, Scalia, Kennedy
- Dissent: Blackmun, joined by Brennan, Marshall
- Dissent: Stevens, joined by Brennan, Marshall, Blackmun

Laws applied
- Title VII of the Civil Rights Act of 1964
- Superseded by
- Civil Rights Act of 1991

Wards Cove Packing Co. v. Atonio, 490 U.S. 642 (1989), was a court case concerning employment discrimination, argued before the United States Supreme Court on January 18, 1989, and decided on June 5, 1989.

== Wards Cove Packing Company ==
Wards Cove Packing Company was a cannery located in the community of Ward Cove, on the northern outskirts of the larger city of Ketchikan in the U.S. state of Alaska. The original Wards Cove Cannery was established in 1928, on Ward Cove and operated several Alaskan salmon canneries, employing about 200 people during the peak season. The company closed in 2004, and was sold to non-fishing interests.

== Facts ==
A group of nonwhite cannery workers (most of them native Alaskans and Filipino Alaskeros) including Frank Atonio filed suit in District Court citing Title VII of the Civil Rights Act of 1964. They alleged that the Wards Cove Packing Company, a company that operated several Alaskan salmon canneries, was using discriminatory hiring practices, resulting in most of the unskilled seasonal cannery jobs being filled by nonwhite workers, while the skilled permanent "non-cannery" jobs, which paid significantly more, were largely filled by white workers.

== Judgments ==
The District Court found in favor of the company.

The workers appealed to the United States Court of Appeals for the Ninth Circuit, which reversed the District Court decision, stating the workers had made a prima facie case of disparate impact. The decision was based on statistics provided by the workers that showed a high percentage of nonwhite workers in the cannery jobs and a low percentage of the skilled noncannery jobs filled by nonwhite workers. The court also ruled that if a substantial difference in the racial composition of the available population and the composition of the positions was found, it was then incumbent upon the employers to prove that this was not due to discriminatory hiring practices.

The company then appealed the Court of Appeals' ruling to the United States Supreme Court. The Supreme Court determined that the Court of Appeals had erred by using inappropriate statistics and comparison. The majority determined that the proper comparison was to compare the percentage of nonwhite workers in noncannery jobs with the percentage of the available labor pool that were nonwhite and who had the appropriate skills to perform the noncannery jobs.

The Supreme Court remanded the case back to the Court of Appeals with instructions to use the more appropriate comparison. Further if, on remand, the Respondents did establish a prima facie disparate-impact case, the Petitioners would then need to "produce evidence of a legitimate business justification" for the hiring practices that created the disparity.

== Significance ==
Soon after the decision, Congress amended Title VII with the Civil Rights Act of 1991 to counter the Supreme Court's holding in Ward's Cove, thereby nullifying the case's precedent. Section 3 of the Act reads:

The purposes of this Act are-

1. to provide appropriate remedies for intentional discrimination and unlawful harassment in the workplace;
2. to codify the concepts of "business necessity" and "job related" enunciated by the Supreme Court in Griggs v. Duke Power Co., 401 U.S. 424 (1971), and in the other Supreme Court decisions prior to Wards Cove Packing Co. v. Atonio, 490 U.S. 642 (1989);
3. to confirm statutory authority and provide statutory guidelines for the adjudication of disparate impact suits under title VII of the Civil Rights Act of 1964 (42 U.S.C. § 2000e et seq.); and
4. to respond to recent decisions of the Supreme Court by expanding the scope of relevant civil rights statutes in order to provide adequate protection to victims of discrimination.

== See also ==
- List of United States Supreme Court cases, volume 490
- List of United States Supreme Court cases
- Lists of United States Supreme Court cases by volume
- List of United States Supreme Court cases by the Rehnquist Court
- Hazelwood School Dist. v. United States
- Texas Dept. of Community Affairs v. Burdine
- List of canneries

== Archives ==
- Cannery Workers and Farm Laborers Union Local 7 records. 1915-1985. 46.31 cubic feet.
- Cindy Domingo Papers. 1978-2010. 27.9 cubic feet (28 boxes).
- Silme Domingo Papers. 1952-1992. 1 cubic foot (1 box).
- New England Fish Company Records circa 243.81 cubic feet (252 boxes).
- Tyree Scott Papers . circa 1970-1995. 73.00 cubic feet. (73 boxes).
