= International Longshore and Warehouse Union =

North American labor union

- Founded: August 11, 1937; 89 years ago
- Legal status: 501(c)(5) labor organization
- Headquarters: San Francisco, California, US
- Members: 29,056 (2020)
- President: Willie Adams
- Subsidiaries: International Longshore & Warehouse, Pacific Longshoremen's Memorial Association
- Affiliations: Canadian Labour Congress; International Transport Workers' Federation
- Revenue: $7,380,493 (2014)
- Expenses: $5,980,052 (2014)
- Employees: 33 (2014)
- Website: ilwu.org

The International Longshore and Warehouse Union (ILWU) is a labor union which primarily represents dock workers on the West Coast of the United States, Hawaii, and in British Columbia, Canada; on the East Coast, the dominant union is the International Longshoremen's Association. The union was established in 1937 after the 1934 West Coast Waterfront Strike, a three-month-long strike that culminated in a four-day general strike in San Francisco, California, and the Bay Area. It disaffiliated from the AFL–CIO on August 30, 2013.

The union, which still uses hiring halls, has a single labor contract with the Pacific Maritime Association which covers all 29 seaports on the west coast of the US, from Bellingham, Washington, to San Diego; its 15,000 dockworkers were paid an average of $171,000 in 2019. The union has been described as "the aristocrat of the working class" and their members "lords of the docks" for their high pay and power over a choke point of the global economy.

== 20th-century history ==
=== 1934 West Coast Waterfront strike ===
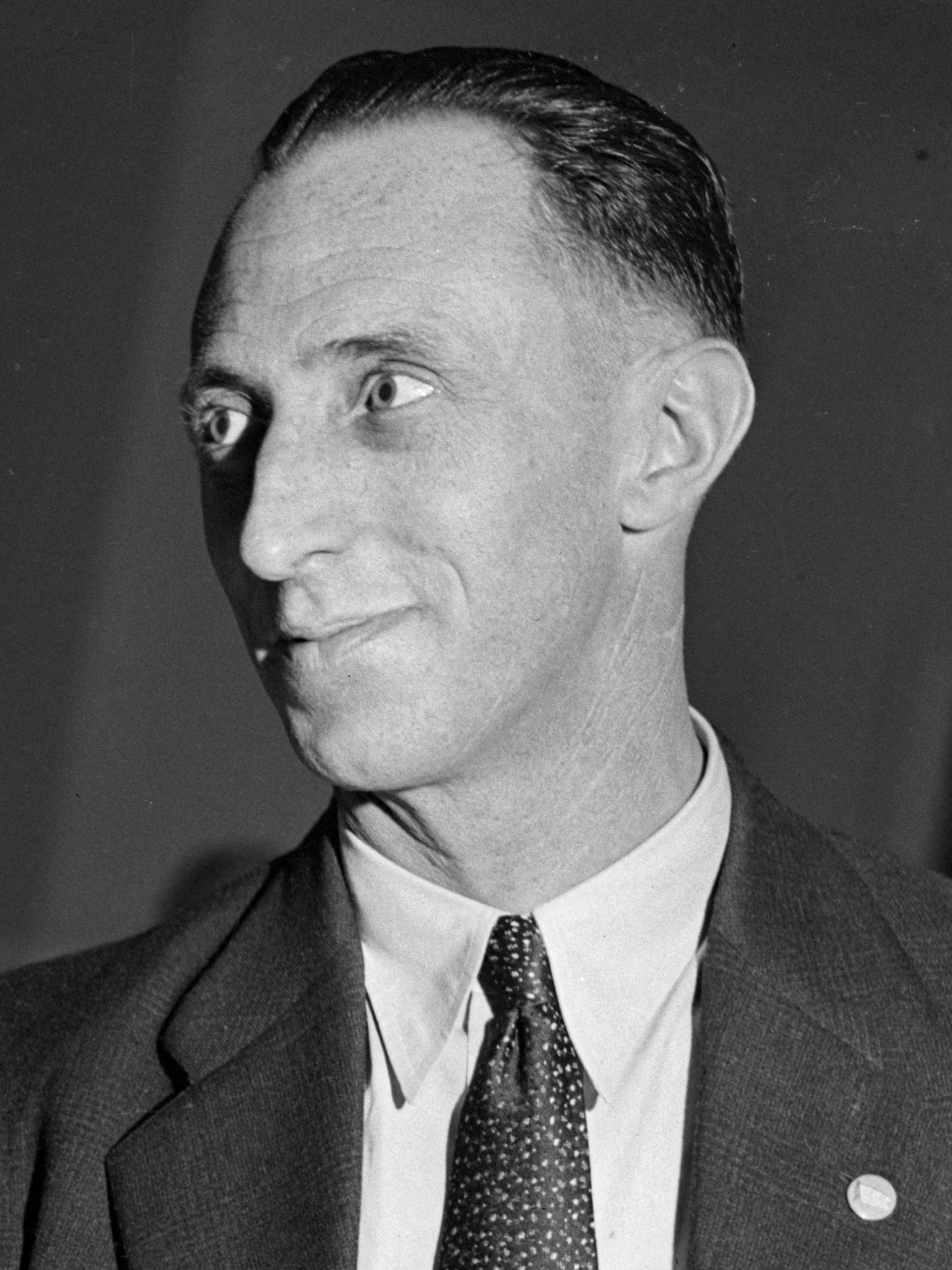
Harry Bridges led the ILWU from 1934 to 1977

Longshoremen on the West Coast ports had either been unorganized or represented by company unions since the years immediately after World War I, when the shipping companies and stevedoring firms had imposed the open shop after a series of failed strikes. Longshoremen in San Francisco, then the major port on the coast, were required to go through a hiring hall operated by a company union, known as the "blue book" system for the color of the union's membership book.

The Industrial Workers of the World had attempted to organize longshoremen, sailors and fishermen in the 1920s. A number of former IWW members and other militants, such as Harry Bridges, an Australian-born sailor who became a longshoreman after coming to the United States, soon joined the International Longshoremen's Association, when passage of the National Industrial Recovery Act in 1933 led to an explosion in union membership in the ILA among West Coast longshoremen.

Those activists, known as the "Albion Hall group" after their usual meeting place in San Francisco, made contacts with like-minded activists at other ports. They pressed demands for a coastwide contract, a union-run hiring hall and an industrywide waterfront federation and led the membership in rejecting the weak "gentlemen's agreement" that the conservative ILA leadership had negotiated with the employers. When the employers offered to arbitrate, but only on the condition that the union agree to the open shop, the union struck every West Coast port on May 9, 1934.

The strike was a violent one: When strikers attacked the stockade in which the employers were housing strikebreakers in San Pedro, California, on May 15, the employers' private guards shot and killed two strikers. Similar battles broke out in San Francisco and Oakland, California, Portland, Oregon, and Seattle, Washington. When the employers made a show of force in order to reopen the port in San Francisco, a pitched battle broke out on the Embarcadero in San Francisco between police and strikers. Two strikers were killed on July 5 by a policeman's shotgun blast into a crowd of picketers and onlookers. This incident is known as Bloody Thursday and is commemorated every year by ILWU members.

When the National Guard moved in to patrol the waterfront, the picketers pulled back. The San Francisco and Alameda County Central Labor Councils voted to call a general strike in support of the longshoremen, shutting down much of San Francisco and the Bay Area for four days, ending with the union's agreement to arbitrate the remaining issues in dispute.

The union won most of its demands in that arbitration proceeding. Those it did not win outright it gained through hundreds of job actions after the strikers returned to work, as the union gradually wrested control over the pace of work and the employer's power to hire and fire from the shipping and stevedoring companies through the mechanism of hiring halls. Union members also engaged in a number of sympathy strikes in support of other maritime unions' demands.

=== World War II, integration of African Americans ===
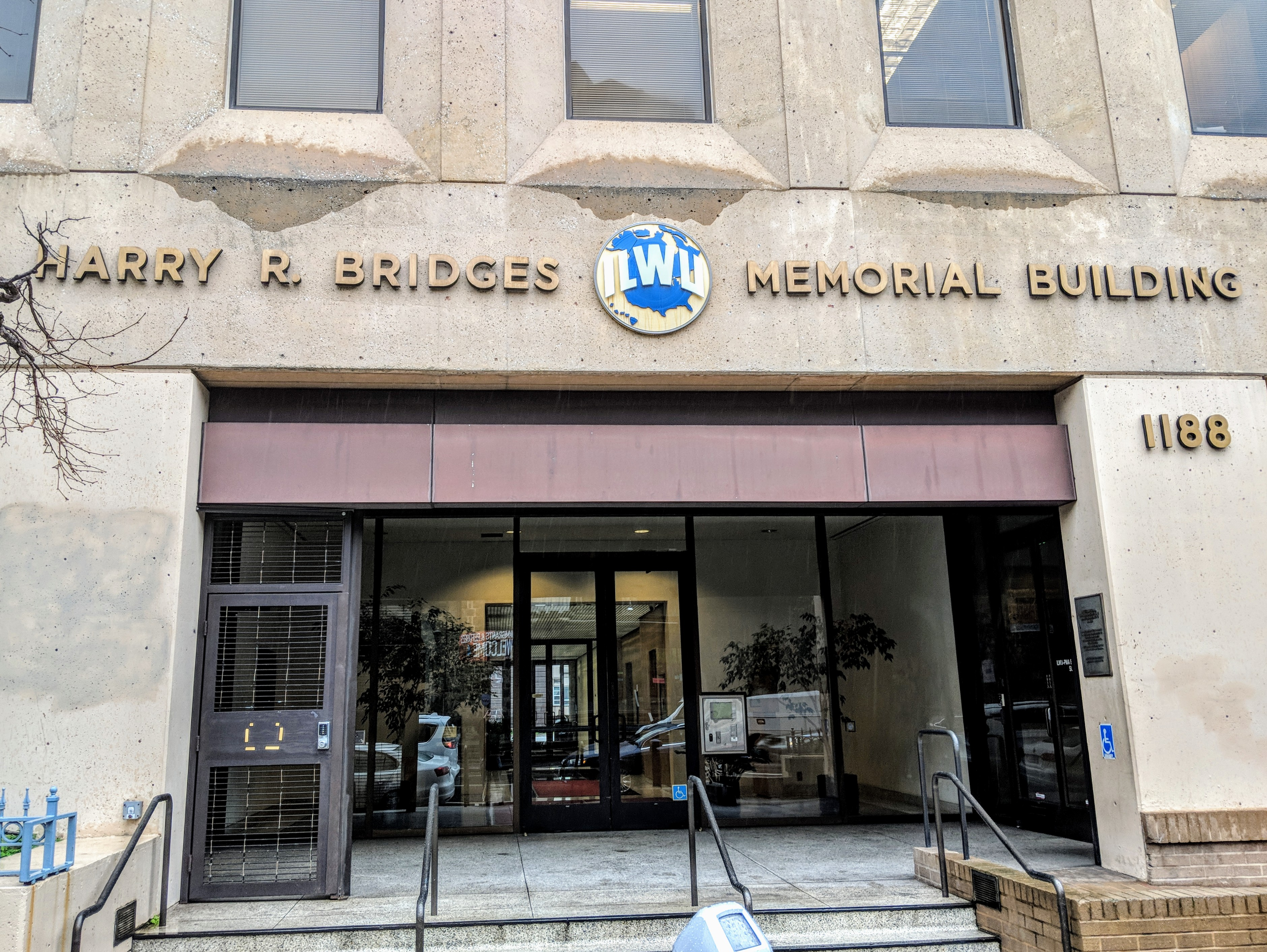
ILWU headquarters in San Francisco

The ILWU admitted African Americans in the 1930s, and during World War II its San Francisco section alone had an estimated 800 black members, at a time when most San Francisco unions excluded black workers and resisted implementation of President Roosevelt's Executive Order 8802 (1941) against racial discrimination in the US defense industry. However, "black union members were a minuscule group within the ILWU [leadership] hierarchy", with the few exceptions concentrated in the Oakland locale, which had an even larger black membership than San Francisco. Also, by the own admission of Richard Lynden, the San Francisco locale's president, the ILWU failed to work on the upgrading (promotion) of its black members. Still, in the judgement of historian Albert S. Broussard, "as far as blacks were concerned, the ILWU stood head and shoulders above other Bay Area locals in virtually every respect" during World War II. As the union extended membership to more and more workers during the war, it would experience incredible growth. Counting roughly 25,000 dues paying members at its inception, the union's rolls expanded to over 65,000 at the end of World War II due to a boost in wartime production and a successful campaign to organize warehouse workers away from the ports.

=== Survival outside CIO and return to AFL–CIO ===
Expulsion had no real effect, however, on either the ILWU or Bridges' power within it. The organization continued to negotiate agreements, with less strife than in the 1930s and 1940s, and Bridges continued to be reelected without serious opposition. The International Fishermen and Allied Workers of America joined with the union in the 1950s. The union negotiated a groundbreaking agreement in 1960 that permitted the extensive mechanization of the docks, significantly reducing the number of longshore workers in return for generous job guarantees and benefits for those displaced by the changes.

The agreement, however, highlighted the lesser status that less senior members, known as "B-men", enjoyed. Bridges reacted uncharacteristically defensively to these workers' complaints, which were given additional sting by the fact that many of the "B-men" were black. The additional longshore work produced by the Vietnam War allowed Bridges to meet the challenge by opening up more jobs and making determined efforts to recruit black applicants. The ILWU later faced similar challenges from women, who found it even harder to enter the industry and the union.

Bridges had difficulty giving up his position in the ILWU, even though he explored the possibility of merging it with the ILA or the Teamsters in the early 1970s. He finally retired in 1977, but only after ensuring that Louis Goldblatt, the long-time Secretary-Treasurer of the union and his logical successor, was denied the opportunity to replace him.

The Inlandboatmen's Union, whose members operate tugs, barges, passenger ferries and other vessels on the West Coast, and who had formerly been part of the Seafarers International Union of North America, merged with the ILWU in 1980. The ILWU rejoined the AFL–CIO in 1988, and disaffiliated with it in 2013.

=== Disaffiliation from the AFL–CIO ===
The ILWU disaffiliated from the AFL–CIO on August 30, 2013, accusing the AFL–CIO of unwillingness to punish other unions when their members crossed ILWU picket lines and over federal legislative policy issues.

=== Dockworker division ===
The ILWU Coast Longshore Division (CLD) is the division of the union that represents (as of 2024) more than 20,000 dockworkers along the West Coast, formed in 1952 as the ILWU was expanding from longshoring to other industries.

== 21st-century history ==
=== 2002 slowdown and lockout ===
The ILWU was accused of engaging in a slowdown of work on docks in 2002, as an alternative to a strike, to support its contract demands in negotiations with the Pacific Maritime Association. The union has documented that productivity was in fact stable at that time, while the employer claims to have contradictory data. The employers responded to the slowdown with a lockout, disallowing the workers to do their jobs. The Bush administration sought a national emergency injunction under the Taft–Hartley Act against both the employers and the union, and threatened to move longshore workers from coverage under the National Labor Relations Act to coverage under the Railway Labor Act, which would effectively prevent longshore workers from striking. (This is a long-time goal of the PMA and other companies whose workers the ILWU represents.)

The Longshore Contract that resulted from 2002 negotiations expired on July 1, 2008. The ILWU and the PMA reached a tentative agreement for a new six-year Longshore Contract in July 2008. In the following weeks, the ILWU membership voted to approve the new contract.

=== 2008 May Day work stoppage ===
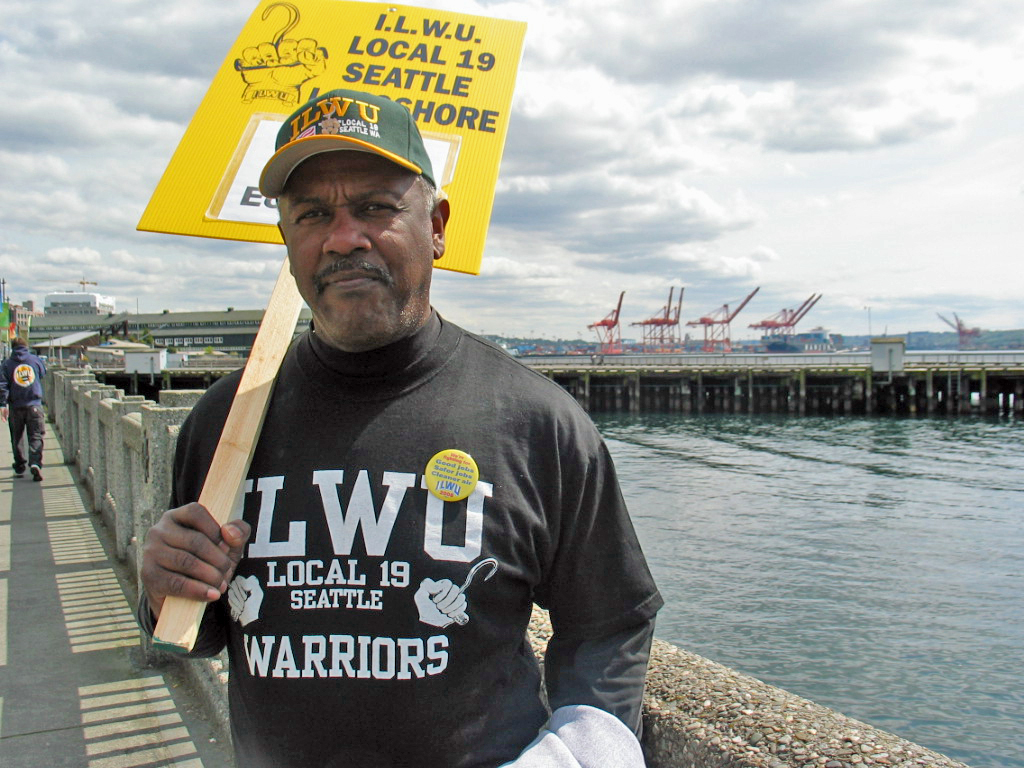
Longshore worker and crane operator Al Webster joined the Seattle march on May 1, 2007 to call for an end to the Iraq war.

In protest of the Iraq War, the ILWU encouraged longshore workers to "shut down all West Coast ports" by walking off the job on May 1, 2008, to "make May Day a 'No Peace, No Work' holiday." On May 1, more than 10,000 ILWU members from all 29 West Coast ports voluntarily stopped work, with some attending rallies held by the ILWU where the union called for working-class people to withhold their labor to protest the war. The employer, the Pacific Maritime Association, filed a complaint against the Union for conducting what it saw as an illegal work stoppage. The court agreed with the PMA and determined that the ILWU had conducted a "secondary boycott" against the PMA, which is illegal under the National Labor Relations Act of 1935.

=== 2013 disaffiliation from AFL-CIO ===
In August 2013, the ILWU disaffiliated from the American Federation of Labor - Congress of Industrial Organizations (AFL-CIO). The ILWU said that members of other AFL–CIO unions were crossing its picket lines, and the AFL–CIO had done nothing to stop it. The ILWU also cited the AFL–CIO's willingness to compromise on key policies such as labor law reform, immigration reform, and health care reform. The longshoremen's union said it would become an independent union.

=== 2014 Israeli ship standoff ===
In August 2014, the Israeli-owned ZIM Piraeus was the subject of a major demonstration at the Port of Oakland instigated by the Arab Resource and Organizing Center (AROC). Approximately 500 protesters opposed to Israeli military actions in the Gaza Strip participated. The AROC claimed to have been supported by ILWU dockworkers who refused to unload the ship's cargo, stating that "Workers honored our picket and stood on the side of justice." However, the union denied this saying it had taken no position on the conflict in Gaza "but in cases when unsafe circumstances arise ... the union must protect the safety of its members in the workplace." An ILWU spokesman said workers were not prepared to become involved because of safety issues related to the size of the demonstration and the heavy police presence. However, several news reports and blogs claimed that some members from ILWU Locals 34 and 10 openly supported the protesters. On August 21, the Piraeus docked at a different terminal, where two dozen longshoremen unloaded the cargo overnight.

=== 2014–2015 negotiations ===
After expiration of its contract with the Pacific Maritime Association July 1, 2014, months-long contract negotiations with the Pacific Maritime Association were characterized by backups in West Coast ports and mutual accusations of a slowdown. Base pay was about $35 an hour. In Southern California, the lockout slowdown caused more than twenty-five cargo ships to idle off the coast, affecting over 700 mariners, primarily Overseas Filipinos.

In 2014, when the Pacific Maritime Association reported that the nationwide average ILWU union member earned $147,000, the Seattle Times found that in 2013 "longshore employees" earned an average of $85,000 in Seattle and $114,000 in Tacoma, while "clerks" earned an average of $153,000 in Seattle and $159,000 in Tacoma, and "foremen" in Seattle and Tacoma averaged $204,000. The union stated that this average pay does not include "casual" (part-time) workers, who are not union members and earn a minimum of $26 per hour.

=== 2019 unlawful labor practices lawsuit ===
In November 2019, a terminal operations company, International Container Terminal Services Oregon, won a $94 million jury trial verdict against ILWU for unlawful labor practices including "work stoppages, slowdowns, 'safety gimmicks' and other coercive actions" which occurred between August 2013 and March 2017 at the Port of Portland (Oregon) terminal, and resulted in all shippers ceasing to use the terminal. In March 2020, the judge reduced the amount to $19 million. ICTS declined the reduced award, and opted to continue litigating its claims of $42 - $142 million in a trial scheduled for February 2024.

=== 2020 George Floyd & Juneteenth shutdowns ===
ILWU members stood by in memorial for 8 min 46 seconds on June 9 to protest the murder of George Floyd and for 8 hours on Juneteenth at all 29 of the U.S.'s Pacific Coast ports in solidarity with the protests sweeping the nation.

=== 2022 industrial action in response to the Russian invasion of Ukraine ===
In response to the 2022 Russian invasion of Ukraine, ILWU said that their members will not load or unload any Russian cargo in 29 ports across the United States. The president said that "With this action in solidarity with the people of Ukraine, we send a message that we unequivocally condemn the Russian invasion." The ILWU was part of the global industrial boycott of port and maritime workers against Russian-flagged ships and cargo.

=== 2023 BC Port Strike ===
From July 1 to July 13, workers went on strike freezing the movement of billions of dollars' worth of cargo at Canada's busiest ports. The union rejected a number of offers before voting to ratify the new deal in August. The union priorities were to address inflation and wages, job automation and port automation and contracting out work. Federal labour minister Seamus O'Regan stated all options were available, leaving the possibility for back-to-work legislation, but it was ultimately not needed to resolve the dispute.

=== 2023 bankruptcy filing ===
On October 1, 2023, the ILWU filed for Chapter 11 bankruptcy, stating it can no longer afford to keep fighting claims by ICTSI concerning the amount of its liability for its 2012 illegal work stoppages at the Port of Portland.

== Presidents ==
- Harry Bridges (1937–1977)
- Jimmy Herman (1977–1991)
- David Arian (1991–1994)
- Brian McWilliams (1994–2000)
- Jim Spinoza (2000–2006)
- Bob McElrath (2006–2018)
- Willie Adams (2018–present)

== Other members ==
=== California ===
- Brace Belden, podcaster and union activist
- Archie Brown, defendant in United States v. Brown
- Germain Bulcke, Vice President (1947–1960), President of Local 10 (San Francisco Bay Area) (1938–1947)
- Karl Yoneda, Japanese American activist and union organizer

=== Canada ===
- Don Garcia, Canadian Area President (1970–1978, 1980–1984, 1986–1991)
- Rob Ashton, Canadian Area President (2016–present), First Vice President (2012–2016)

=== Hawaii ===
- Jack Hall, Vice President (1969–1971), Hawaii Regional Director (1944–1969)
- Helen Lake Kanahele, President of the Women's Auxiliary
- Ah Quon McElrath, labor reform leader and social activist
- Yoshito Takamine, member of the Hawaii House of Representatives (1959–1984)

=== Oregon ===
- Francis J. Murnane, President of Local 8 (Portland, Oregon) (1956–1968)

=== Washington ===
- Silme Domingo, labor activist and murder victim (alongside Gene Viernes)
- Earl George, President of Local 9 (Seattle, Washington) (1949–1961)
- Phil Lelli, President of Local 23 (Tacoma, Washington) (1966–1969, 1971–1975, 1977–1986)
- Gene Viernes, labor activist and murder victim (alongside Silme Domingo)

== See also ==
- Los Angeles Port Police Association
- Waterfront Workers History Project

== Sources ==
- Bernstein, Irvin. The Turbulent Years: A History of the American Worker, 1933-1941. Paperback edition. Boston: Houghton-Mifflin Co., 1970. ISBN 0-395-11778-X. (Originally published 1969.)
- Holusha, John (May 2, 2008). "Dockworkers Protest Iraq War". The New York Times.
- Kimeldorf, Howard. Reds or Rackets?: The Making of Radical and Conservative Unions on the Waterfront. Berkeley, Calif.: University of California Press, 1992. ISBN 0-520-07886-1.
- Larrowe, Charles. Harry Bridges, The Rise and Fall of Radical Labor in the U.S. Rev. ed. Chicago: Chicago Review Press, 1977. ISBN 0-88208-032-6.
- Nelson, Bruce. Workers on the Waterfront: Seamen, Longshoremen and Unionism in the 1930s. Urbana, Ill.: University of Illinois Press, 1988. ISBN 0-252-06144-6.
- Quin, Mike. The Big Strike. New York: International Publishers Company, 1996. ISBN 0-7178-0504-2.
- Selvin, David F. A Terrible Anger: The 1934 Waterfront and General Strikes in San Francisco. Detroit, Mich.: Wayne State University Press, 1996. ISBN 0-8143-2610-2.
