= Filipinos in Hawaii =

Total population
- 342,095 (22.8%)

Languages
- English, Tagalog, Ilocano, Visayan, other Philippine languages, Hawaiian Pidgin

Religion
- Catholicism, Protestantism, Buddhism

Related ethnic groups
- Other Filipino Americans and Overseas Filipinos

People of Filipino descent make up a large and growing part of the State of Hawaii's population. In 2000 they were the third largest ethnic group and represented 22.8% of the population, but more recently, according to the 2010 United States census, they have become the second largest ethnicity in Hawaii (25.1% in 2010), after Whites.

According to the 2000 Census, the state of Hawaii had a Filipino population of over 275,000, with over 191,000 living on the island of Oahu; of those, 102,000 were immigrants. Furthermore, Filipinos made up the third largest ethnicity among Asian Pacific Americans, while making up the majority of the populations of Kauaʻi and Maui counties. In June 2002, representatives from the Arroyo Administration and local leaders presided over the grand opening and dedication of the Filipino Community Center in Waipahu. In the 2010 census, Filipino Americans became the largest Asian ethnicity in Hawaii, partially due to the declining population of the state's Japanese Americans. In 2011, four percent of all Filipino immigrants in the U.S. resided in the Honolulu metro area, and were 43% of all immigrants in the Honolulu metro area as well. Filipino immigrants in Hawaii made up six per cent of all Filipino immigrants in the United States.

== History ==
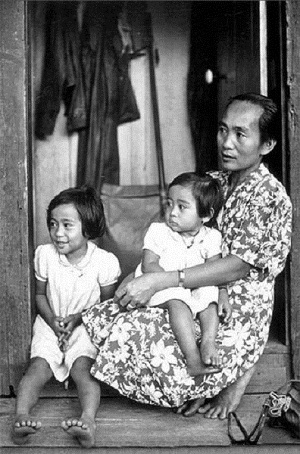
Filipino immigrants, c. 1906

A recent study showed that the Philippine Islands may have been a homeland or stopover for the ancient Austronesian-speaking Lapita culture, ancestors of the Polynesians, thousands of years ago, based on DNA findings tracing Polynesian-raised chickens to the Philippines.

=== 19th century ===
A few Filipinos, known as "Manila men" settled in the Kingdom of Hawaii during the 19th century. They mainly worked as cooks and musicians in the Royal Hawaiian Band. No deliberate migration existed during this period.

However, there was an exemplary "Manila man" that Hawaii's history has forgotten. His name was Jose Sabas Libornio. Born in Manila on December 5, 1858, Jose Sabas Libornio was an important figure and an unsung hero in Hawaiian history. Libornio, a Filipino composer, headed the Royal Hawaiian Band during the overthrow of the Hawaiian Kingdom in 1893. He was a close and loyal friend of Queen Liliʻuokalani, the last monarch of Hawaiʻi, whose compositions may have included the Hawaiian protest song “Kaulana Nā Pua” (“Famous are the Flowers/Children”). The song was a collaboration with Hawaiian songwriter Ellen Kehoʻohiwaokalani Wright Prendergast.

Libornio left Honolulu for Peru after the overthrow. While in Peru, Libornio received Peruvian President Nicolas de Pierola's apportionment as Director General de las Bandas de Music's del Ejercito. He wrote Peru's second national anthem, "March de Banderas."

==== Manila men ====
The Manila men were some of the first Filipino overseas workers. They were the first Filipinos to be documented having come to North America.

=== Early- to mid-20th century ===
The importation of Filipinos workers called “Sakadas,” which roughly translates to “Filipino migrant workers” and also referred to the actual importation of these workers, began in 1906 and continued until 1946. During that time an estimated 125,000 Filipinos were recruited from the Ilocos and Visayas regions of the Philippines to work in Hawaii. Initially, Filipino men were recruited by the Hawaiian Sugar Planters' Association (HSPA) from the Philippines to Hawaii to work in the sugarcane fields. Later sakadas were recruited for work in both sugarcane and pineapple fields. Filipino migrant workers were recruited to replace Japanese workers that had been going on strike because of low pay, long work hours and substandard living conditions. These ethnic groups were segregated so that Filipinos would not be influenced by the striking Japanese workers and so the Filipinos could be used as leverage against the striking Japanese. Filipino workers that lacked education and had previous experience in agricultural work were preferred by recruiters because they were perceived to be easier to exploit and control. Sakadas were 3-year contract workers and did not have the intention to stay in Hawaii. Most wanted to make their riches and go back home with enough money to buy land. This was common practice up until the 1940s. The contracts gave them passage to Hawaii and then back to the Philippines after their contract was over. In the 1940s the perception of working in Hawaii became glorya (glory) and so more Filipinos sought to stay in Hawaii. Workers were housed in plantation barracks that they paid rent for, worked long 10-hour days, 6 days a week and were paid 90 cents a day. They were the lowest paid workers of all the ethnicities working on the plantations. Most sakadas were single males; however, over time sakadas would send for relatives or bring families with them. The last sakadas in 1946 were notable and different compared to all the sakadas prior and are referred to as the Sakada ‘46. Several factors making the Sakada ‘46 different was that it included more women, children and relatives of previous sakadas. It was also different in that some had an American colonial education, and professionals were included.

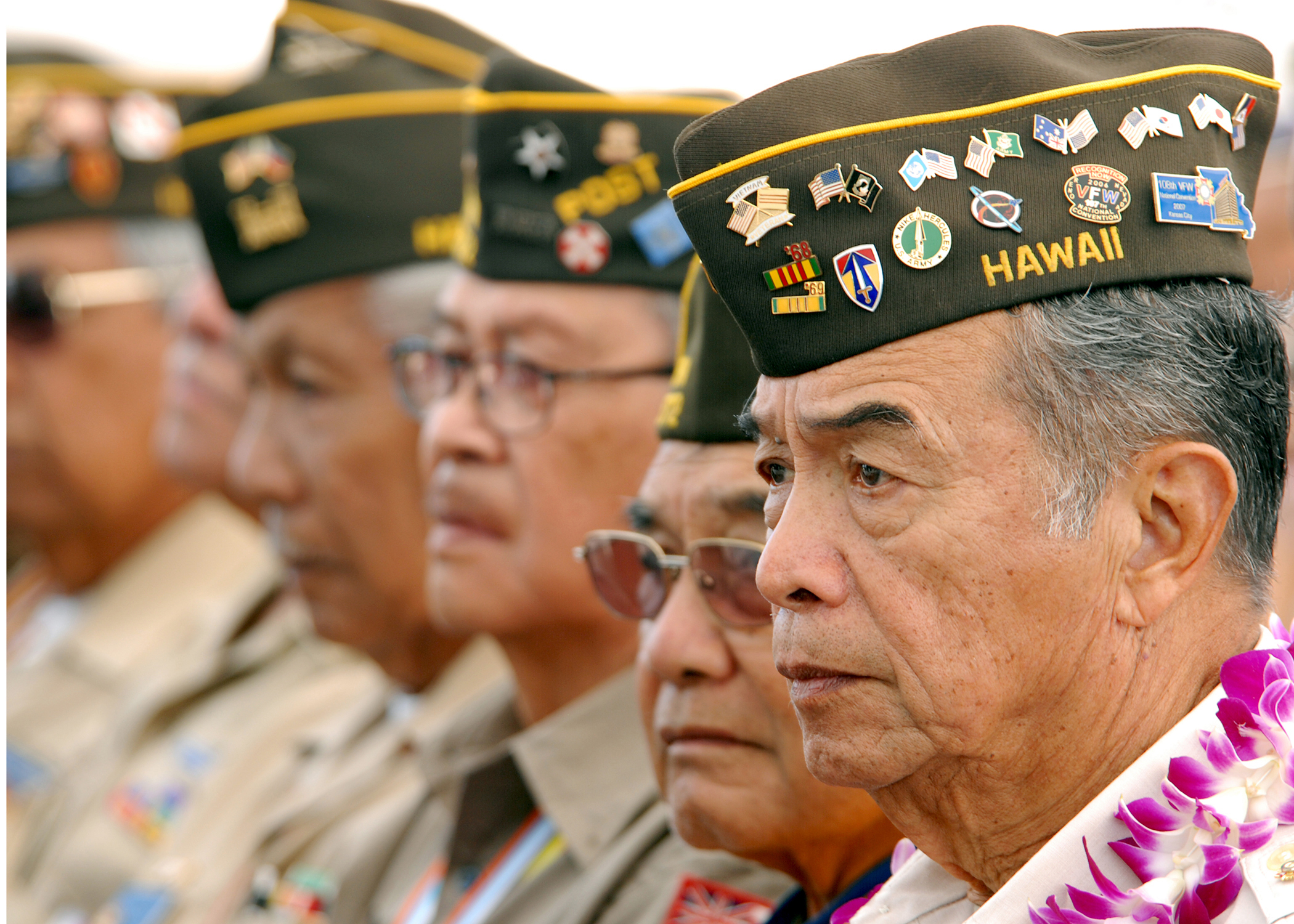
Filipino-American World War II veterans during Araw ng Kagitingan memorial ceremony, 2009

=== Hawaiian Sugar Planters' Association ===
Many Filipino farm laborers were recruited to go to Hawaii in 1906 by the Hawaiian Sugar Planters’ Association (HSPA) to work on the sugar plantations in Hawaii. Albert F. Judd, an HSPA recruiter tried to get three hundred Filipinos to work in Hawaii. Those Filipinos were sent to the Olaa Plantation on the Big Island of Hawaii. The sugar industry was booming at the time so the newly annexed countries of Hawai’i and the Philippines were used in concert to support the industry for the United States.

By the 1920s there was an average of 7,600 Filipinos arriving in Hawaii annually. Most Filipinos considered themselves temporary residents in Hawaii until around the 1940s. The HSPA preferred Filipinos to work on sugar plantations because they were known to be hard working and were given the lowest wage of all ethnicities working in the plantation.

=== Treatment ===
During the early to mid twentieth century (1906-1940s), hundreds, if not thousands of Filipino workers (Sakadas) migrated to Hawaii to find better work opportunities. As more Sakadas migrated to Hawaii a collective identity formed and they began to see themselves as Filipino-Americans. However, in response to this, non-Filipino groups collectively degraded their ethnicity and culture with racial stereotypes. As a result, Filipino-American identity is largely defined by non-Filipinos and has permeated itself within Hawai’i society.

Majority of Filipino workers were predominantly men and upon their arrival stereotypes like “poke-knives” and the use of their kinship terms (in the native Filipino language) in a derogatory manner emerged. Some stereotypes depicted Filipino men particularly as highly emotional, prone to violence and criminally inclined. For example, the book Temperament and Race published in 1926 focused on the temperamental qualities in people and used it to compare traits in various races, more specifically Filipinos. This study can be seen as further demonizing Filipino men workers in Hawai’i. Subsequently, these stereotypes happened frequently in which Filipino men were more likely to be charged for misdemeanors and murder, as well being the number one race in Hawai’i to receive the death penalty within the first half of the twentieth century. Moreover, Hawai’i media like the Honolulu Daily newspaper (Honolulu Star-Bulletin) and radio would specifically target Filipinos as the main perpetrator of violence by highlighting their convictions on front pages furthering the vilification of Filipinos. Historically, economically, and politically, Filipinos during the Plantation era could be seen as a subordinate minority, therefore Filipino-Americans have found it especially difficult to contest the stereotyping that emerged from the early twentieth century as many misrepresentations still exist today.

=== Impact on Hawaii's working class ===
Some Native Hawaiians worked alongside Filipinos in the sugar plantations. Since the sugar industry in Hawaii was the main source of income for the working class, there was high demand for these jobs. American sugar plantation owners weren't able to get Native Hawaiians to work for them so they relied heavily on the importation of other ethnicities.

=== Late 20th century ===
The United States Immigration and Nationality Act of 1965 allowed more Filipinos to bring family to Hawaii and this allowed more Filipino arrivals, particularly Filipino women, to enter the state. The increase in arrivals also caused some backlash and in the 1970s Filipinos felt discriminated against. They also tended to do more poorly at schools than average in that decade. The reasons why Filipino students underperformed in school in the 1970s is unknown, but discrimination may have contributed. In 1970, of the 93,915 Filipinos living in Hawaii, only 34.4% were high school graduates.

Former President Ferdinand Marcos spent his last years in Hawaii after his family's 21-year conjugal dictatorship in the Philippines was ousted in 1986 through the People Power Revolution. When he fled to Hawaii by way of Guam, he also brought with him 22 crates of cash valued at $717 million, 300 crates of assorted jewelry with undetermined value, $4 million worth of unset precious gems contained in Pampers diaper boxes, 65 Seiko and Cartier watches, a 12 by 4 ft box crammed full of real pearls, a 3 ft solid gold statue covered in diamonds and other precious stones, $200,000 in gold bullion and nearly $1 million in Philippine pesos, and deposit slips to banks in the US, Switzerland, and the Cayman Islands worth $124 million, which he all amassed during his dictatorship. Throughout his stay in Hawaii, he and his family enjoyed a high life, living in a luxurious house while shopping and eating in one of the state's most expensive sections, as his wife Imelda entertained guests through various costly parties, while Filipinos back in the Philippines suffered from the debt the Marcos family incurred during their rule, which experts say may be fully paid only by 2025, three decades after the downfall of the Marcos authoritarian regime.

== Demographics and socioeconomics ==
The 2010 census showed that Filipinos surpassed Japanese as Hawaii's largest racial group. The total population of Filipinos was 342,095 of which 197,497 were full Filipinos, the total population of Japanese was 312,292 of which 185,502 were full Japanese. According to surveys conducted by the American Community Survey showed that Filipinos overtook Japanese between 2007 and 2008.

In 2020, there were 383,200 Filipino Americans in Hawaii. A quarter of the population of Hawaii are Filipino Americans. In 2019 Filipino Americans were the second largest ethnicity in Hawaii, after European Americans. Despite Filipino Americans in Hawaii having a slightly higher Median Family Income, the Filipino Per Capita Income ($27,738) in Hawaii is significantly lower than the total population ($36,989). In addition to this Filipino Americans in Hawaii were significantly less likely to attain a bachelor's degree. There is no indication of socioeconomic mobility among the subordinate groups like Filipinos, Samoans, Hawaiians. Filipino Americans, and other immigrant minorities have been restricted access to opportunities. This thereby maintains them in their subjugated position in low-paying service and other blue-collar jobs that preclude their socioeconomic mobility The majority of Filipino Americans in Hawaii live in multigenerational households; and nearly a third work in the service industry. During the first year of the COVID-19 pandemic, Filipino Americans were about a fifth of all COVID-19 cases in Hawaii. 2023 Hawaii wildfires on Maui significantly impacted the Filipino American community in Lahaina, where 40% of the community's population before the wildfires were Filipino Americans.

== See also ==
- Japanese in Hawaii
- Puerto Rican immigration to Hawaii
- Portuguese immigration to Hawaii
- Spanish immigration to Hawaii
- Chinese immigration to Hawaii
- Korean immigration to Hawaii
