= Emil de Guzman =

Filipino-American activist

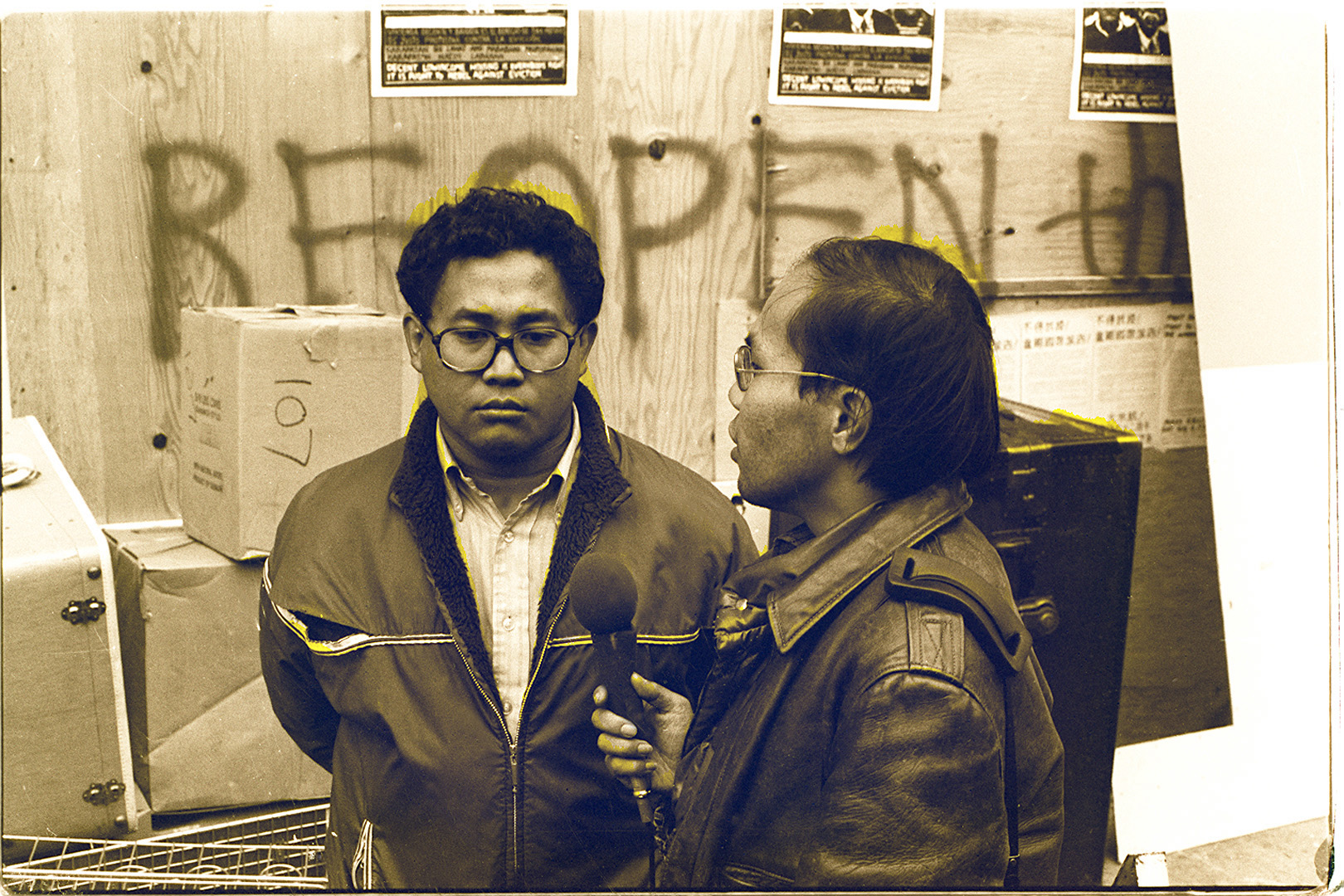
- De Guzman interviewed the day after the I-Hotel eviction (1977)
- Born: San Francisco, California, U.S.
- Education: University of California, Berkeley; Harvard University (MPA, 1992)
- Occupations: Activist, Educator
- Years active: 1969–present
- Known for: President of the International Hotel Tenants Association; I-Hotel eviction resistance movement
- Notable work: Red Sky: Recollections of the International Hotel

Emil de Guzman is a Filipino-American activist known for his involvement in the International Hotel (I-Hotel) eviction protests that took place from 1968 to 1977, as well as for his involvement in the Union of Democratic Filipinos (KDP).

== Early life and education ==
Emil de Guzman was born and raised in San Francisco, California, and would often visit Manilatown with his father. His family resided in the Fillmore District, but later moved to the Richmond District, where he attended Catholic school. De Guzman recalls that there were not many Filipino people going to school with him growing up, and he often faced racism from peers. However, he felt like he could not talk to his parents about it and instead channeled his efforts into school. His visits to Manilatown with his father fostered a close connection to the International Hotel and his efforts to resist threats made to evict the elderly Filipino residents. De Guzman attended George Washington High School in the Richmond District. He later attended the University of California, Berkeley.

== Activism and the International Hotel ==
=== Early activism ===
According to an interview he gave, de Guzman realized that racism permeates society in college as he learned about Filipino-Americans such as Carlos Bulosan. When he attended UC Berkeley, the university did not yet have an Ethnic Studies department. De Guzman was an advocate for the Third World Liberation Front and a student leader of the 1969 Third World Strike on the Berkeley campus. The strike helped precipitate the establishment of the Department of Ethnic Studies at Berkeley. The Departments of Asian American Studies, Black Studies, and Chicano Studies were established later, by the end of his college career in 1969.

In the late 1960s and 70s, de Guzman became involved in housing rights of low-income residents. While at Berkeley he participated in community fieldwork for non-profits and youth programs, gaining a deep understanding of issues people were experiencing in his own neighborhood. De Guzman credits that community fieldwork at UC Berkeley with developing his activism skills, which he later deployed at the I-Hotel.

=== The Union of Democratic Filipinos (KDP) ===
De Guzman played a key role in the Union of Democratic Filipinos (KDP) alongside Bruce Occeña. The organization focused on political issues in the Philippines—particularly under the dictatorship of Ferdinand Marcos—as well as challenges faced by Filipinos in the United States. Its goal was to mobilize Filipinos to advocate for their rights as a minority group in the U.S. and to bring attention to injustices happening abroad.

=== Asian American Political Alliance (AAPA) ===
De Guzman was also a member of the Asian American Political Alliance (AAPA) in Berkeley, California.

=== The International Hotel ===
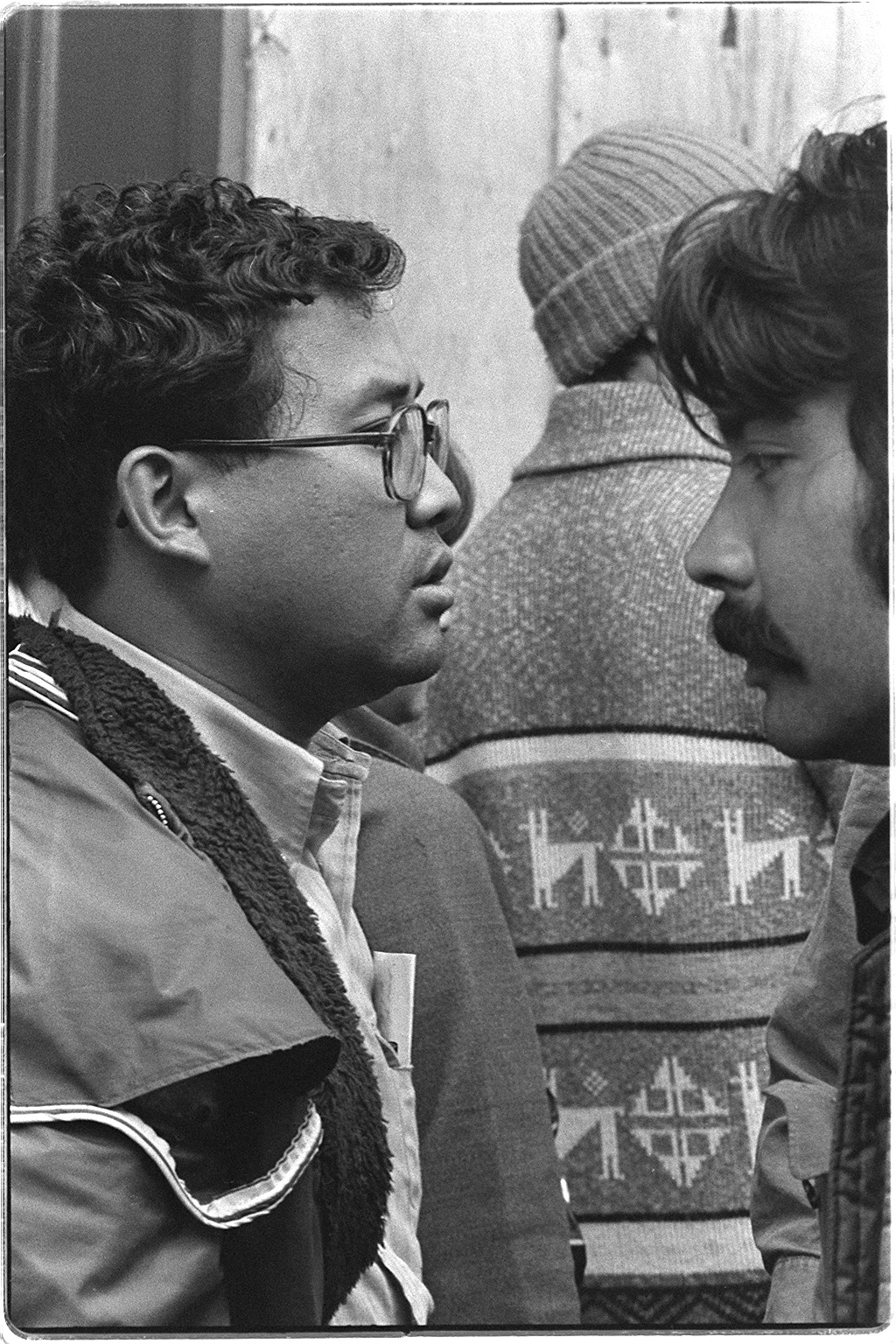
De Guzman (left) at the I-Hotel in August 1977

De Guzman emerged as a key figure in the struggle to preserve the International Hotel (I-Hotel) in San Francisco, a low-income residential building in Manilatown that primarily housed elderly Filipino and Chinese residents.

In 1968, Milton Meyer & Co., a real-estate company, issued eviction notices to I-Hotel tenants, planning to demolish and replace the I-Hotel with a parking garage. The demolition would have resulted in the destruction of 10 blocks of low-cost housing and a variety of local Filipino businesses such as barber shops and markets.

Later, in the mid-1970s, de Guzman served as president of the International Hotel Tenants' Association (IHTA) during critical years leading up to the hotel's eviction in 1977. His leadership role grew out of his volunteer efforts after a hotel fire in 1969, when an arson resulted in the death of 3 tenants. De Guzman had resided in the hotel as an on-and-off resident for over five years. In 1975, he was the first to alert the KDP regional leadership that the hotel was in the process of being sold to the Thailand-based firm Four Seas Corporation. Along with other KDP members and activists, de Guzman responded by working through the I-Hotel Tenants' Association. Every day, a small number of tenants led by the president of the Tenants' Association, Wahat Tampao, and de Guzman protested at City Hall by blocking the corridors and demanding an audience with the mayor or members of the Board of Supervisors. Afterwards, they would go across the street and demand a meeting with the executive director of the Redevelopment Agency or the Housing Authority. De Guzman—along with 3,000 people, including tenants, religious leaders, and other activists—also formed a barrier around the hotel to prevent 300 riot-geared police officers from evicting the residents.

== Personal life ==
De Guzman grew up visiting Manilatown with his father. He would not rediscover the significance of that event until his years as a student at UC Berkeley, where he and his peers sought to reclaim their cultural history. What began as a personal journey soon became a public crusade. In the 1970s, de Guzman—then a biology and physical education major—moved into the I-Hotel and immersed himself in the lives of the aging Filipino tenants, or manongs, who had built Manilatown from scratch. He became their advocate, their ally, and, eventually, their voice.

At first, de Guzman's parents could not understand his activism. After seeing what was happening in the Philippines under martial law, his parents feared the repercussions of his being involved in activism and revolutionary movements. Manilatown had a reputation for being rough, and they had immigrated from the Philippines to give their son a future far removed from such struggles. De Guzman claimed that inter-generational involvement played an immense part in the battle for the I-Hotel. But over time, as de Guzman stood firm in his commitment—even challenging lawmakers on behalf of the tenants—his mother became one of his biggest supporters. His father's death in 1976 preceded the eviction by just a year, but the emotional resonance of that period would stay with de Guzman for life.

== Legacy ==
=== Keeper of the I-Hotel legacy ===
The I-Hotel was demolished in 1979, but the movement it sparked never disappeared. For nearly three decades, de Guzman helped lead efforts to preserve the landmark's memory. He became the president of the Manilatown Heritage Foundation, organized commemorative events, and fought to ensure that any redevelopment of the I-Hotel site would serve the Filipino community. Thanks in part to his leadership, the new I-Hotel building, which opened in 2004, includes 104 units of affordable senior housing and a proposed Manilatown Heritage Center, a space that will preserve artifacts, stories, and artistic works from the original struggle. His activism has inspired younger generations. His daughter, Sarah Maya, participates in annual commemorations through poetry and music. Other youth, many born after the eviction, have come to see the I-Hotel story as foundational to their own political awakenings. De Guzman characterized the long-term preservation of the International Hotel site, even in its vacant state, as a "political victory." Even now de Guzman continues to inspire others, using his book, "Red Sky: Recollection of the International Hotel," which recounts his experience resisting the I-Hotel eviction and describes the gentrification of impoverished neighborhoods and the displacement of minority groups in San Francisco. Today, that ground is rising again due to the effort of many activists—especially Emil de Guzman, who is the keeper of the I-Hotel flame.

=== Continuing efforts in response to Filipino-American human rights ===
Emil de Guzman played a key role in advocating for the reopening of the Filipino Education Center in San Francisco. As the treasurer of the Filipino American Human Rights Advocates and a member of the San Francisco School Board's bilingual advisory committee, de Guzman was instrumental in lobbying the school board to reverse its prior decision to relocate the center. He emphasized the importance of preserving culturally and linguistically appropriate education for Filipino-American students, particularly at the elementary level, and continued to advocate for expanded bilingual programs at the middle and high school levels. De Guzman identified systemic barriers within school leadership as contributing to ongoing educational disparities and called for increased mentorship and support to address high dropout and teenage pregnancy rates among Filipino youth.

== Later career ==
In the later stages of his career, Emil de Guzman joined the faculty of California State University, Sacramento, where he was appointed a professor. Drawing on his extensive experience in activism and community leadership, he delivered lectures that reflected his deep commitment to social justice. Through his academic work, de Guzman continued to mentor and inspire students, bridging his lifelong advocacy with scholarship and education.
