= Al Robles =

American writer

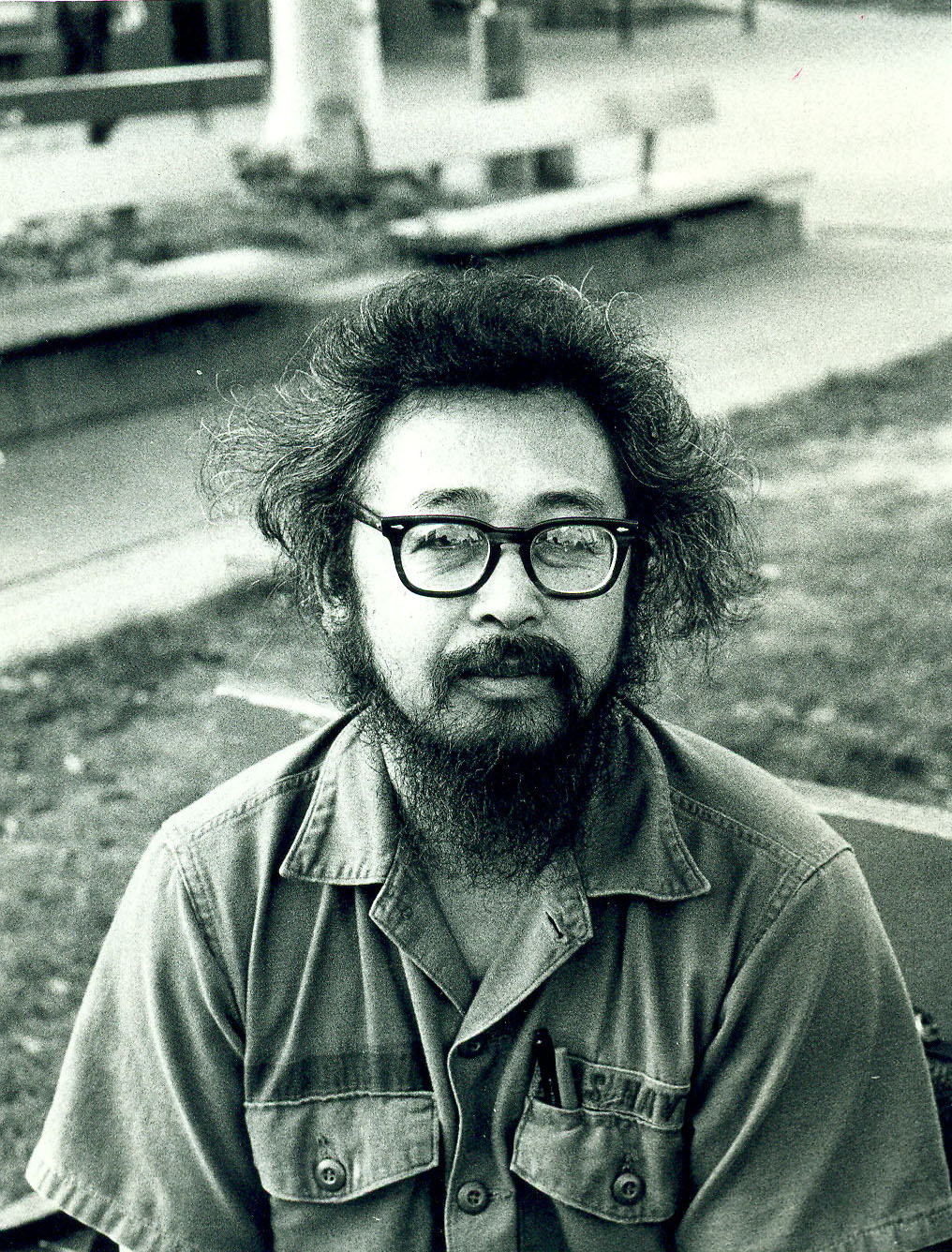
- Filipino poet Al Robles in Washington Square Park, San Francisco, California, 1975
- Born: Alfred A. Robles; February 16, 1930; San Francisco
- Died: May 2, 2009 (aged 79); San Francisco
- Occupation: Poet
- Children: Okashi Robles
- Writing career
- Genres: poetry, short story, children's author, Historian
- Notable work: Rappin' with Ten Thousand Carabaos in the Dark (1992)
- Website: www.manongalrobles.org

Alfred A. Robles (February 16, 1930 – May 2, 2009) was a Filipino American poet and community activist in San Francisco. Born in 1930, he was the second eldest in a family of ten brothers and sisters and grew up in the Fillmore district of San Francisco. A community character, he was instrumental in the political fight against the city to stop the demolition of the International Hotel on Kearny Street. He was also a prominent member of the San Francisco-based Asian American writers' collective Kearny Street Workshop.

Al Robles combined heritage with experience. His poetry and community work honored Filipino elders (Manongs) and also inspired and encouraged the young students, activists, writers and artists to connect to their Filipino heritage. Verses about traditional Filipino foods, his experiences in Hawaii, New Mexico, and community personalities in San Francisco resulted in countless poems, and two published works: "Looking for Ifugao Mountain: Paghahanap Sa Bundok Ng Ifugao and Rappin' with Ten Thousand Carabaos in the Dark.

In 2008, filmmaker Curtis Choy released a documentary about Al Robles called Manilatown is in the Heart: Time Travel with Al Robles, focusing on Robles' many personalities and community roles. It has been shown at countless film festivals, including the 2009 DisOrient Film Festival, in Eugene, OR, Asian Pacific Heritage Month 2009 in Los Altos Hills, and the 2009 Los Angeles Asian Pacific Film Festival, where it was a Finalist for the Grand Jury Award for Best Documentary.

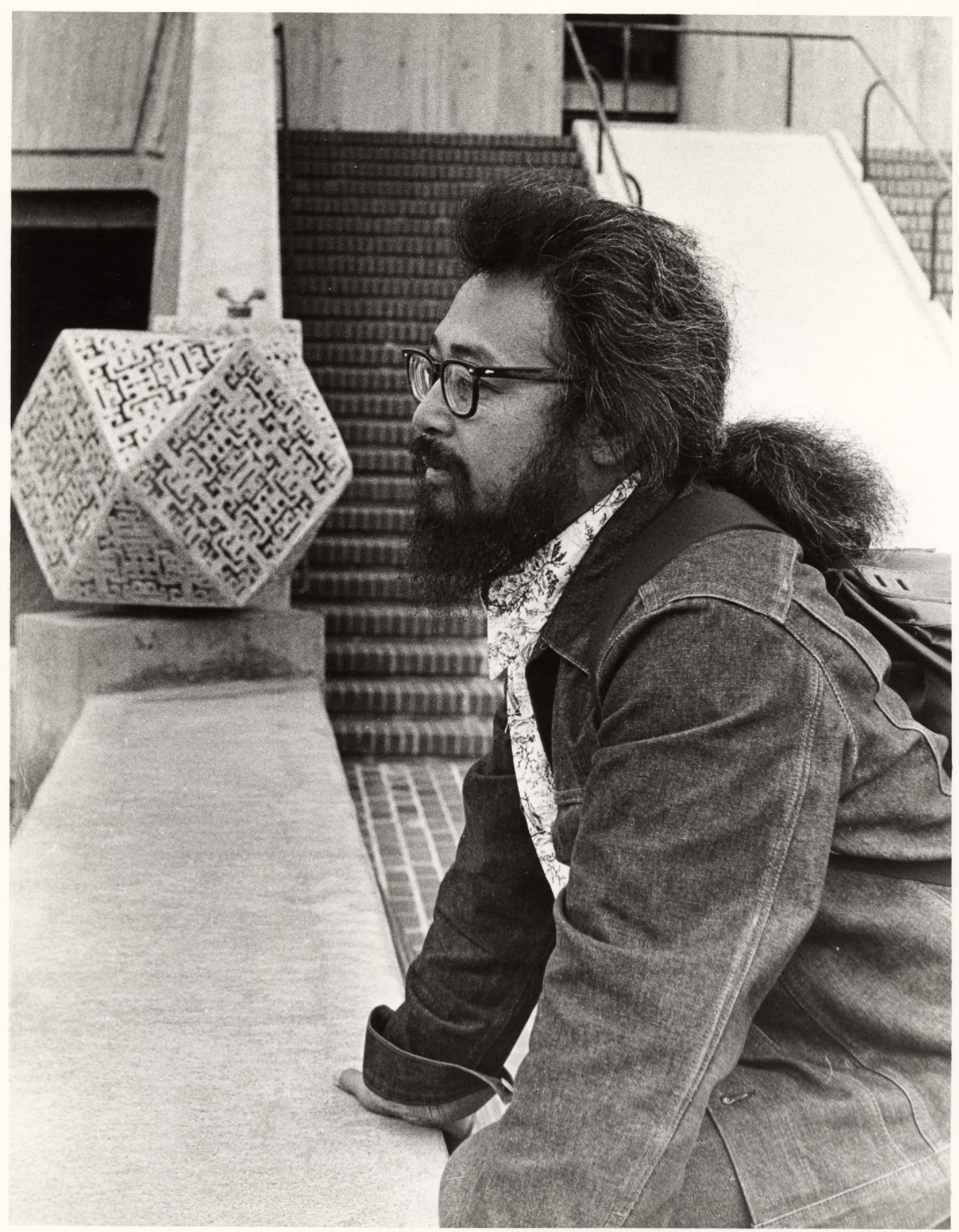
Poet Al Robles in front of the Chinese Culture Center, San Francisco,1975.

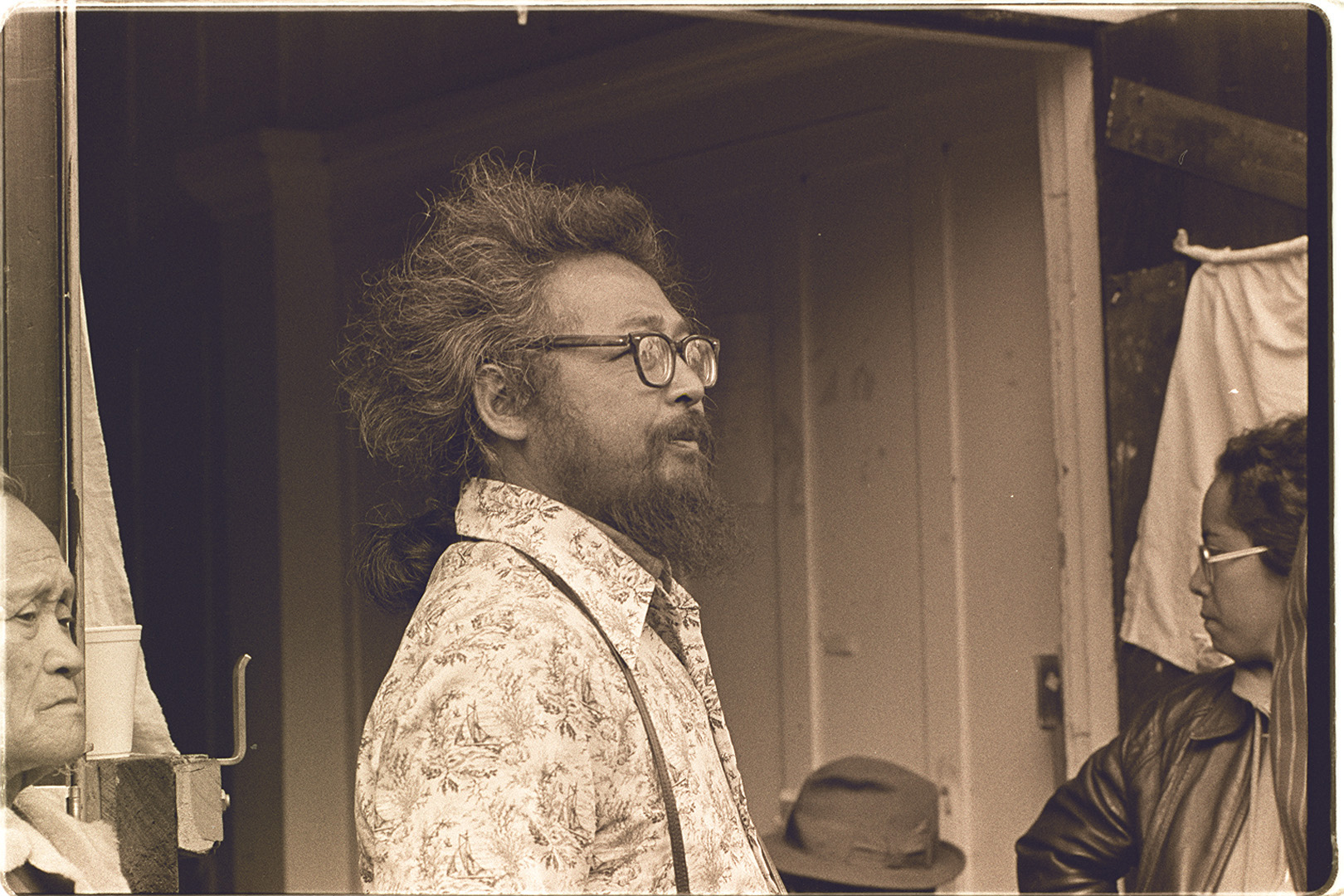
Poet Al Robles the day after eviction of the I-Hotel.

== Works ==
=== Poetry ===
- Ifugao Mountain: Paghahanap Sa Bundok Ng Ifugao (1977)
- Rappin' with Ten Thousand Carabaos in the Dark (1992)

=== Film ===
- Manilatown is in the Heart: Time Travel with Al Robles (2008)
