= Little Manila =

Community with a large Filipino immigrant and descendant population

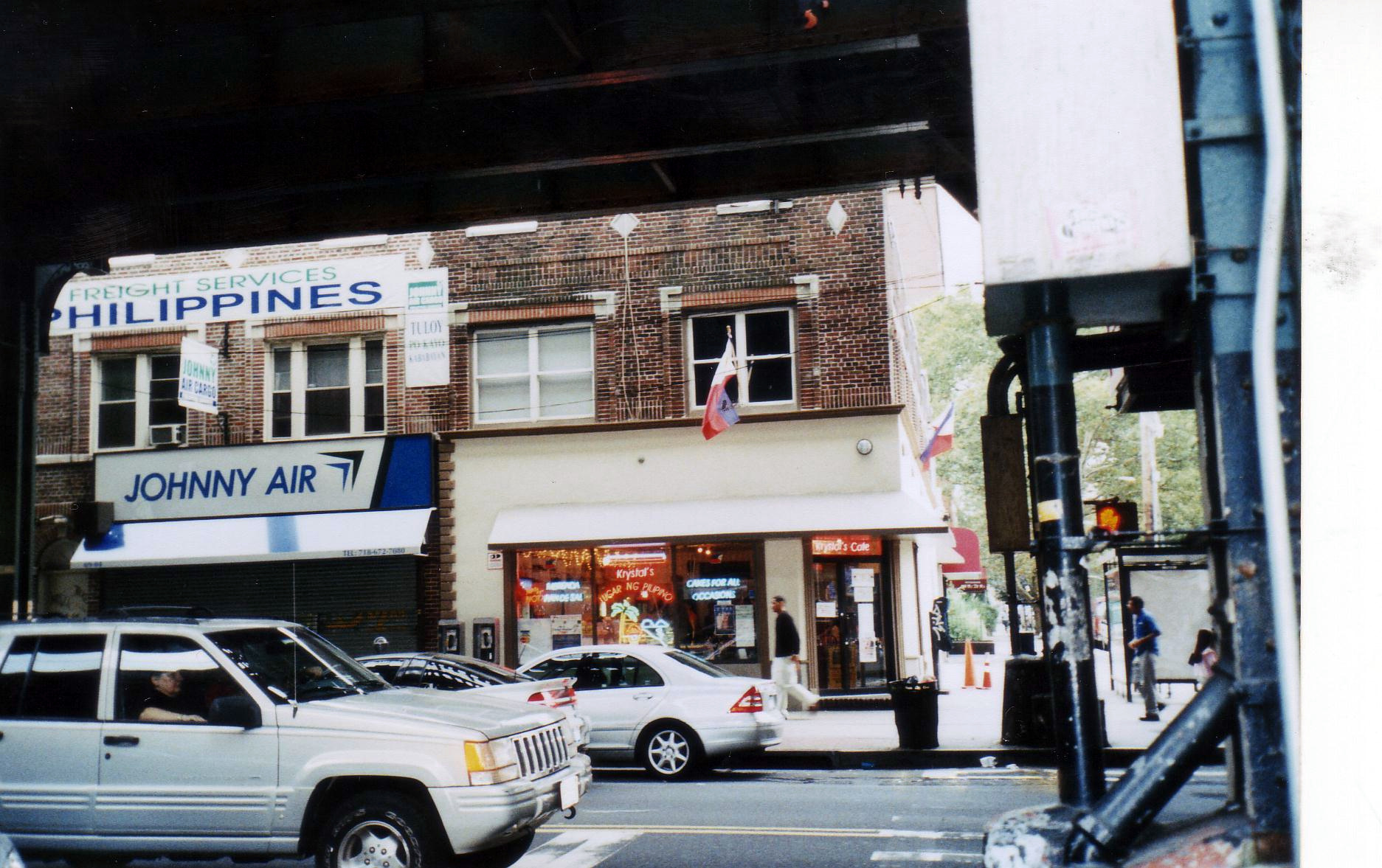
- Little Manila in Woodside, Queens, New York City

Filipino name
- Tagalog: Munting Maynila; Maliit na Maynila

A Little Manila (Filipino: Munting Maynila or Maliit na Maynila), also known as a Manilatown (Filipino: Bayang Maynila) or Filipinotown (Filipino: Bayang Pilipino), is a community with a large Filipino immigrant and descendant population. Little Manilas are enclaves of overseas Filipinos, a term for Filipinos living outside of the Philippines indefinitely or for a limited period. It can also include seamen and others who work outside the Philippines, but are neither permanent nor temporary residents of another country.

== Characteristics ==
=== Filipino markets and Businesses ===
According to Rick Bonus, author of Locating Filipino Americans: Ethnicity and the Cultural Politics of Space, "...Filipinos only deal with Filipinos." The author meant that Filipino society is very "tightly bound" and tends to only purchase Filipino products only from known Filipino grocery stores, even though the same products may be available at more mainstream retailers.

=== Filipino restaurants ===
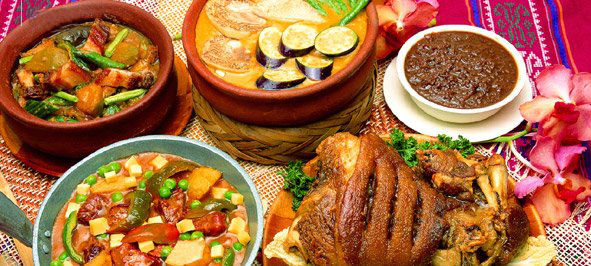
A selection of Filipino dishes

Many Filipinos who grow up in a Filipino enclave experience a yearning for Filipino food. For example, one author stated that "... my stomach was trained at an early age to love Filipino food. I ate tocino (sweet pork) and longanisa (sweet sausage) for breakfast, and had adobo, pancit, and beef caldereta for dinner... White kids... would make faces at my food and ask what I was eating."

== Locations ==
=== Australia ===
==== Sydney ====
There are about 85,000 Filipino-Australians in the area controlled by Blacktown City Council. Philippine-born residents comprise 5.9% of the population in the City of Blacktown and are the largest directly born ethnic group in Blacktown. More than fifty percent of Filipino-Australians are based in New South Wales.

Filipino food shops exist around Blacktown railway station.

==== Melbourne ====
"... in different areas of Metropolitan Melbourne, with the greatest number settling down in the western suburbs." Filipinos in Victoria, a website from Vicnet, a division of the State Library of Victoria.

=== Canada ===
==== Manitoba ====
===== Winnipeg =====
Winnipeg is home to 56,400 Filipinos, making them the third largest Filipino community in Canada by total population, however the largest by percentage (8.7%). The Filipino community in Winnipeg is the largest visible minority group in Winnipeg ahead of the Chinese-Canadians and Indo-Canadians (but excluding aboriginal Canadians, who are not counted as a "visible minority" by Statistics Canada). Winnipeg is home to the more established Filipino community in Canada with mass migration beginning in the 1950s.

About 1 out of 10 Filipinos in Canada call Winnipeg home. There is also a Filipino community centre called The Philippine Canadian Centre of Manitoba (PCCM) providing social and service to the Filipino community and also holds events such as Folklorama. There are also Filipino newspapers such as The Pilipino Express News Magazine, The Filipino Journal, and Ang Peryodiko. There is also a radio station, CKJS, which broadcasts Filipino related news, music, lifestyle and much more.

Winnipeg's Filipino population is largely concentrated in the West End and North End areas of the city. The neighborhood around Sargent Avenue and Arlington Street is 45% Filipino, and the neighborhood around Sargent Avenue and Wall Street is 47% Filipino.

There were reports of a proposal to establish a Filipino cultural district that is seeking community consultations.

==== Ontario ====
===== Greater Toronto Area =====
Toronto, in the province of Ontario, is home to the largest Filipino contingency in Canada with over 250,000 living in Toronto and its suburbs. Toronto's population is 5% Filipino and they are the fourth-largest visible minority group. Toronto is the premier destination for Filipino immigrants and tourists with about 9,000 coming every year.

====== Downtown Toronto ======
Downtown Toronto is home to over 670,000 people of which 3% or over 20,000 are of Filipino origin. Most Filipinos living in Downtown Toronto live in the neighbourhoods of St. James Town, where Filipinos make the largest visible minority group accounting for 22% of the population, and Parkdale, particularly around Jameson Avenue.

Compared to other parts of Toronto, Downtown Toronto has a small number of Filipino businesses. In St. James Town and the surrounding neighbourhoods, there are a few businesses and offices scattered around the area. Some of these include a store (Philippine Variety Store), a take-out restaurant (Wow Philippines! Eat Bulaga!), and a dental office (Dr. Victoria Santiago and Associates). The community centre (The Filipino Centre, Toronto) has moved to the suburb of Scarborough.

====== North York ======
North York, the northern inner suburb of Toronto, is home to over 620,000 people of which about 4% or over 25,000 are of Filipino origin. North York's Filipino community is concentrated primarily around Clanton Park and Flemingdon Park.

The main thoroughfare of Bathurst street is generally populated by Filipino residents. In Clanton Park, the intersection of Bathurst Street and Wilson Avenue is the site of a high concentration of Filipino businesses. Due to their active presence, the area is unofficially called "Little Manila." Street festivals occur during the summer season. The biggest Filipino street festival called Taste of Manila is held at this location.

Across the Overlea Bridge from Thorncliffe Park, Flemingdon Park is home to many Filipinos. Of the almost 25,000 residents of Flemingdon Park, about 2,500 are of Filipino descent. Like most high-rise communities in Toronto, Flemingdon Park witnessed the growth of their Filipino community during the 1970s and 80s.

Filipinos make up the majority, or about 60%, of the congregation at St. John XXIII Parish. For many years, the Filipino Chaplaincy of the Archdiocese of Toronto was housed at the church. Mass was held every Sunday in Tagalog, Simbang Gabi masses were held every year and devotions to Sto. Nino and the Black Nazarene were held while the Filipino Chaplaincy was active at St. John XXIII Parish. The Filipino Chaplaincy left the parish in the August 2008 for Our Lady of Assumption Parish in the Bathurst Street area. The school adjacent to the parish, St. John XXIII Catholic School, is also attended by predominantly Filipino students.

====== Scarborough ======
Scarborough, the eastern part of Toronto is home to about 600,000 people with about 7% or over 40,000 people are of Filipino origin. Filipino Canadians are the third largest Asian Canadian subgroup and fourth largest visible minority group in Scarborough.

Filipino establishments and offices dot the Scarborough landscape with almost every mall and plaza having at least one Filipino establishment. Some of the popular restaurants are Marcy Fine Foods, Remely's, Kapitbahay, Tagpuan(4 branches in Scarborough and 1 downtown), JJ Kapuso, Jesse Jr., Laguna, Palma’s, Coffee In, Edge barbecue and FV Foods. Home of Empanada, Nette’s, Manila Bakery and Baker's Best all specialize in Filipino sweets and breads. US-based, Filipino-owned grocery chain Seafood City has a branch here. Most of these establishments double as a store with imported Filipino products. Many remittance and door to door services have offices in Scarborough such as Mabini Express, PNB, Forex, UMAC Express Cargo, Gemini Express, and RemitX. The community centre (The Filipino Centre, Toronto) is now located at the southeast corner of Brimley and Sheppard Avenue. It was formerly located downtown.

====== Mississauga ======
Mississauga, a city immediately west of Toronto and Canada's sixth-largest city, is home to over 700,000 people of which 4.6% or just over 30,000 are of Filipino origin. Filipino Canadians constitute the third largest Asian Canadian subgroup and fourth largest visible minority group. Tagalog is the 7th most spoken language in the city. The growth of Mississauga's Filipino community is mostly due to its proximity to Toronto.

Mississauga has many Filipino establishments and professional offices scattered throughout the city. Some of the popular establishments are Something Sweet 4 U (2 branches), Maharlika's, Halo Halo World Cafe. There are several stores that specialize in Filipino goods and many Asian supermarkets carry Filipino products. US-based, Filipino-owned grocery chain Seafood City has a branch here. There are many professional offices, mainly dental and law offices.

Mississauga plays host to many Filipino cultural events. Mississauga has two Filipino community centres, Kalayaan Community Centre and The Fiesta Filipina Centre for the Arts. Mississauga Valley Park hosts many community events including the Kalayaan Independence Day Picnic and the Philippine Colleges and Universities Alumni Associations Summerfest. At the city centre, Mississauga Celebration Square hosts the annual Philippine Festival.

==== Quebec ====
===== Montreal =====
Montreal, the largest city in Quebec, also hosts the largest Filipino community in the province of Quebec. The sixth largest Filipino community in Canada, Montreal is home to nearly 44,000 Filipinos. Filipinos in Montreal are concentrated in the Snowdon neighbourhood and around Decarie Expressway, both areas have many Filipino establishments and professional offices. The Filipino Association of Montreal and Suburbs is an advocacy group for Filipino Canadians active in and around the city of Montreal. It is the oldest such association in Quebec.

=== Italy ===
In Palermo, Italy, the predominantly Filipino quarter is called Little Tondo. Italy is home to 250,000 Filipinos.

=== Japan ===
In Takenotsuka, Adachi Ward, Tokyo, there is an unrecognised Little Manila that mainly comprises a selection of Filipino pubs.

=== Kuwait ===
There are roughly 241,000 (as of December 2020) Filipinos in Kuwait. Most are migrant workers, and approximately 60% of Filipinos in Kuwait are employed as domestic workers.

In 2011, Kuwait was the sixth-largest destination of Overseas Filipino Workers, with 65,000 hired or rehired in the nation in 2011, and accordingly Kuwait has been an important source of remittances back to the Philippines, with over $105 million USD being remitted in 2009. Nine Filipino banks have correspondent accounts with banks in Kuwait to allow for remittance transfers.

There is a Filipino Worker's Resource Center (FWRC) located in Jabriya, and it provides refuge for Filipino workers in Kuwait who have "[experienced] various forms of maltreatment from their employers such as fatigue, non-payment of salaries," as well as "lack of food [and] physical, verbal and sexual abuse". Through assistance from the FWRC, the Philippine Embassy in Kuwait, the Philippine Overseas Employment Administration, and Overseas Workers' Welfare Administration, hundreds of Filipinos in Kuwait have been repatriated to the Philippines due to these issues.

Kuwait had the largest number of voters registered under the Overseas Absentee Voting Act eligible to vote in the 2013 Philippine general election.

=== Malaysia ===
Due to the close geographical location, Malaysia is home to one of the largest Filipino communities in the world which estimate to be around 245,000 and 637,000 individuals. The presence of the Filipinos in Malaysia has been continuous since antiquity. The Filipinos are mainly concentrated in the eastern shores in Sabah where the influence is evident, spurning ghettos in the state such as in Pulau Gaya. Another sizable community also resides in the Kuala Lumpur metropolitan region. The Filipinos in Malaysia are represented in all walks of life, beginning from the refugees from the south to professionals.

=== Saudi Arabia ===
There are many cities in Saudi Arabia where Filipinos have made businesses. For example, in Al Khobar‚ in the eastern province, Filipinos are the majority of the visitors in the Al Ramaniyah Mall‚ where one will find the only Jollibee Restaurant in Eastern Province. There are several Philippine eateries or restaurants in the city. There are also Filipino stores named "Kadiwa" where they sell Philippine products and vegetables such as kangkong and malunggay.

In the city of Jeddah, there is a place called Balad along Jeddah City Center and Jeddah International Market along Madinah Road where Filipinos gather the most during weekends. Surrounded with shopping malls which caters to mainly Filipino customers, there are Filipino restaurants and groceries, and goods from the Philippines. There are three Jollibee Restaurants in Jeddah.

=== Singapore ===
An unrecognised Little Manila exists at the Lucky Plaza, where there are numerous Filipino restaurants, remittance agencies, Filipino beauty salons, Filipino medical offices, and Filipino stores.

=== South Korea ===
A Little Manila exists in the city of Seoul where many Filipinos work and live. The main area where Filipinos congregate and mingle is in the Hyehwa (혜화동) area of Seoul near the Hyehwa Catholic Church. On Sundays‚ Outside the church on the Hyehwa rotary before and after mass, there are many stalls selling various balikbayan goods from the Philippines as well as the United States and some stalls selling snacks and food.

=== Spain ===
The district of Tetuán in Madrid is home to the city's largest concentration of Filipinos, with Filipinos forming the largest immigrant group in four of the district's six neighborhoods. In Barcelona, the majority of Filipinos living in the city is concentrated in the northern half of El Raval, which is reportedly home to fifteen percent of all Filipino citizens in Spain and is also home to most of the local community's cultural and social institutions.

=== Taiwan ===
There are about 77,933 Filipino workers in Taiwan, with 53,868 of them working in the manufacturing sector and 22,994 people working as caregivers. In Taipei, Little Manila is located in Zhongshan North Road, Zhongshan District. Shops and stalls that cater the needs of the Filipino expatriates were established near the Saint Christopher's Roman Catholic Church as most of the church goers are Filipinos or locals with Filipino lineage. Balut is also sold in this location in Taipei.

=== United Arab Emirates ===
The district of Karama and Satwa in Dubai is home to thousands of Filipinos working in Dubai. St. Mary's Church is the focal meeting centre of the Filipino community.

=== United Kingdom ===
The largest Filipino community in the United Kingdom is in and around London, based around Earl's Court. Other towns and cities with significant Filipino communities include Liverpool, Manchester, Birmingham, Leeds and Barrow-in-Furness. Fiestas are held during June, July and August in various cities throughout the UK. The biggest and longest-running Filipino festival in the UK is 'The Barrio Fiesta sa London', held every year in Lampton Park, Hounslow, West London, usually in the month of July.

This event, organised by The Philippine Centre (a voluntary, non-governmental organisation and registered charity in the UK), has been going strong since 1985. It used to be a one-day event on a Sunday, but since 2003, it was extended to two days covering the weekend of both Saturday and Sunday, in order to accommodate all those attending due to a huge boost in visitors and the ever-increasing number of Filipinos in the UK. The Barrio Fiesta sa London is now in its 42nd year as of 2026.

=== United States ===
==== California ====
The 2010 U.S. census, counted approximately 1.2 million Filipino Americans (not including multiracial persons) in California, by far the largest number in the United States. Greater Los Angeles is the metropolitan area home to the most Filipino Americans, with the population numbering over 600,000. Los Angeles County alone accounts for 374,285 Filipinos, the most of any single county in the United States. The San Francisco Bay Area is the metropolitan area with the second largest number of Filipino Americans in the U.S., with a population of over 460,000 as of the 2010 Census.

Elsewhere in California, San Diego County has the second largest Filipino American population of any county in the nation, with a population of about 180,000, and Stockton in the Central Valley has a significant and historic Filipino population. Although there's no "Little Manila", there's a large Filipino community in Delano north of Bakersfield in the San Joaquin Valley, it has a Filipino cultural community center and an annual Filipino festival.

===== Greater Los Angeles =====
Greater Los Angeles is the metropolitan area home to the most Filipinos outside of the Philippines, with the population numbering around 606,657; Los Angeles County alone accounts for over 374,285 Filipinos, the most of any single county in the United States. Greater Los Angeles is also home to the largest number of Filipino immigrants (16 percent of the total Filipino immigrant population of the United States), as of 2011.

Filipinos are the largest group of Asian Americans in the region. The City of Los Angeles designated a section of Westlake as Historic Filipinotown in 2002. Historic Filipinotown is now largely populated by Hispanic and Latino Americans with most Filipinos who once resided in the area and the city in general having moved to the suburbs. In 2014, about a quarter of Historic Filipinotown's population is Filipino, however the population does not have a significant "visible cultural impact";.

The San Gabriel Valley is home to a large population of Filipino Americans, particularly in the cities of West Covina, Walnut, Diamond Bar, Rowland Heights, and Chino Hills. Other large concentrations of Filipino Americans in Los Angeles County can be found in the South Bay area in the cities of Long Beach, and Carson, where "Larry Itliong Day" was dedicated, Panorama City in the San Fernando Valley, and the Cerritos-Norwalk-La Palma area.

The city of Glendale and Eagle Rock neighborhood of Los Angeles is home to a large Filipino community. The Westfield Eagle Rock Plaza Mall has a section with a number of Filipino businesses such as Seafood City, Jollibee, Leelin Bakery, Chow King, and Cebuana Lhullier alongside a Macy's and Target store. Orange County also has a sizable and growing Filipino population, whose population grew by 178 percent in the 1980s. Large populations in the county can be found in the cities of Buena Park, Anaheim, and Irvine. And also in the Inland Empire region including Riverside, Moreno Valley, the Coachella Valley and Mojave Desert.

Historic Filipinotown is a district of Los Angeles, located between the neighborhoods of Westlake and Echo Park. The district's boundaries are defined by the 101 Freeway to the north, Beverly Boulevard to the south, Hoover Street to the west, and Glendale Boulevard to the east, northwest of Downtown Los Angeles. It was created by a resolution proposed by city council member Eric Garcetti on August 2, 2002. The crosswalks in Filipinotown are decorated with traditional Filipino basket weaving patterns.

Historic Filipinotown is one of the few areas where Filipinos first settled in Los Angeles during the early part of the 20th century. Many Filipino American families began purchasing homes and establishing businesses in the area beginning from the 1940s, shifting away from the Little Tokyo area in the 1920s and the Bunker Hill area later. In modern times, Historic Filipinotown reflects the polyglot nature of Los Angeles.

While the district still has a sizable Filipino population, they are in the minority, overshadowed by a sizable Mexican and Central American population. Nevertheless, the area still has one of the highest concentrations of Filipino Americans in Southern California and still remains the cultural heart of Filipinos throughout Los Angeles. Of the 100,000 Filipinos that reside in the City of Los Angeles, an estimated 6,900 are within Historic Filipinotown.

The Historic Filipinotown Chamber of Commerce leads the effort for commercial expansion in the area. Many Filipino service organizations and institutions, such as the Remy's on Temple Art Gallery, Tribal Cafe, Pilipino Workers Center (PWC), Filipino American Community of Los Angeles (FACLA), People's CORE, Filipino American Service Group, Inc. (FASGI), Search to Involve Pilipino Americans (SIPA), and the Filipino American Library (FAL) are located in Historic Filipinotown. The area is also host to many Filipino restaurants, medical clinics and churches, including St. Columban Filipino Church, the first Filipino Catholic church in the United States (founded in 1946).

===== San Francisco Bay Area =====
Until the 1970s, there existed a Manilatown in San Francisco; one of its last remnants was the International Hotel. In 2004, part of Kearny Street in San Francisco was designated Manilatown. In April 2016, the San Francisco Board of Supervisors adopted a resolution that established the SOMA Pilipinas Filipino Cultural Heritage District located in San Francisco's South of Market neighborhood.

Daly City, on the Peninsula region of the Bay Area, has the highest concentration of Filipino Americans of any municipality in the mainland United States; Filipino Americans comprise 33% of the city's population (plus another 10% of Filipino descent), as of 2010. It also has a place in the vernacular as the "Pinoy capital", as well as a sister city of Quezon City, Philippines.

Directly surrounding Daly City and spanning southeast into the Peninsula subregion are other cities that have significant Filipino American populations, such as Colma, Broadmoor, South San Francisco, and San Bruno where Filipino Americans form 24%, 23%, 20.2% and 15% of the total population, respectively. The Peninsula city of Redwood City is home to the Filipino television networks of ABS-CBN and The Filipino Channel (TFC).

Another cluster with a high concentration of Filipino Americans is centered on Vallejo - the largest city in Solano County and just north (across the Carquinez Bridge) of the East Bay in the eastern part of the North Bay. Vallejo has a population of 116,000, 21% of which are Filipino Americans. Many towns around Vallejo also have high populations. American Canyon, just to the north, is almost 30% Filipino American. To the south, on the northernmost tip of the East Bay, are several towns that many Filipino Americans call home, such as Hercules, with 25.1%, and (with at least 10% Filipino American) Rodeo, Pinole, and Pittsburg.

The suburbanization of the Filipino American population has also resulted in many living within a large swath of land that includes the southern portion of the East Bay and much of Santa Clara County, which is the county with the largest Filipino American population in the Bay Area - although this is in some part due to San Jose having nearly one million residents, with 5.6% being Filipino Americans. Just north of Santa Clara County, in the southern ~ third of the East Bay, are several cities with high populations: Union City in particular, with 20.1% Filipino Americans, but also (with over 9% of the total population) Alameda, Hayward, Newark, and San Leandro.

===== San Diego =====
In the early 20th century, Filipinos were concentrated in downtown San Diego, particularly around Market Street; the area was known as "skid row". In the 21st century, Filipino Americans form the largest Asian American subgroup in San Diego County, at almost 6% of the entire county population. San Diego has historically been a popular destination for Filipino immigrants, and has contributed to the growth of its population.

National City, a city bordering the south boundary of San Diego, has a large concentration of Filipino residents, forming almost 17% of the population as of the 2010 Census. Other concentrations include the neighborhoods of Mira Mesa, often referred to as "Manila Mesa", Rancho Penasquitos, Paradise Hills and along Plaza Boulevard in National City. A portion of California State Route 54 in San Diego is officially named the "Filipino-American Highway", in honor of the Filipino American Community.

===== Stockton =====
Stockton in the northern San Joaquin Valley is home to a historic Filipino population that dates back to the 1930s. As of 2010, Filipinos made up 7.2% of Stockton's population.

==== New York ====
New York State's cumulative Filipino population is at around 250,000, mostly within the New York City area. Within New York City, Queens contains the most number of Filipinos in the Empire State. To a lesser extent, Filipino communities are also present in Nassau, Suffolk, and Rockland counties.

===== Woodside, Queens =====
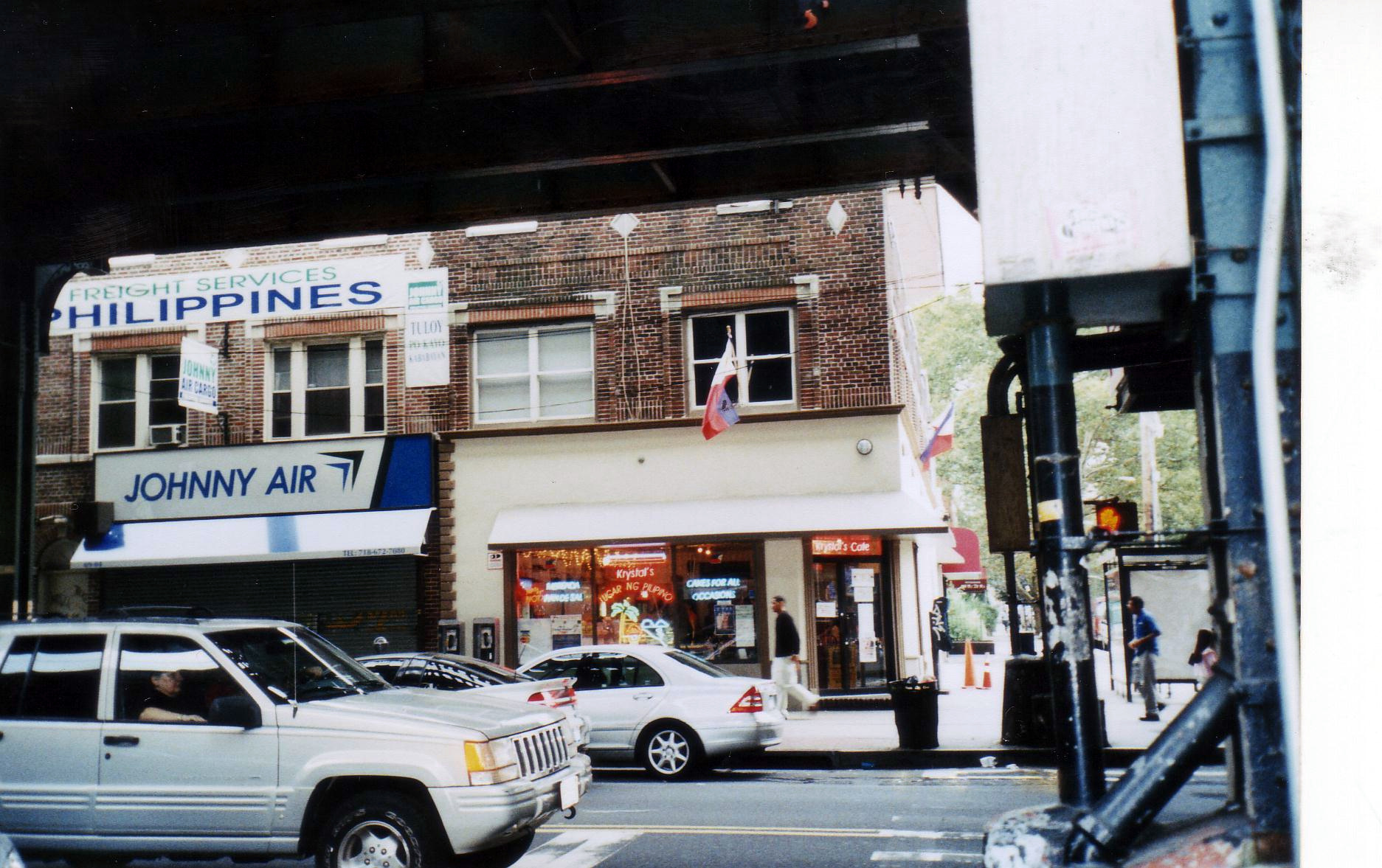
Krystal's Cafe and Johnny Air Cargo shops on Roosevelt Avenue, Woodside, Queens, New York.

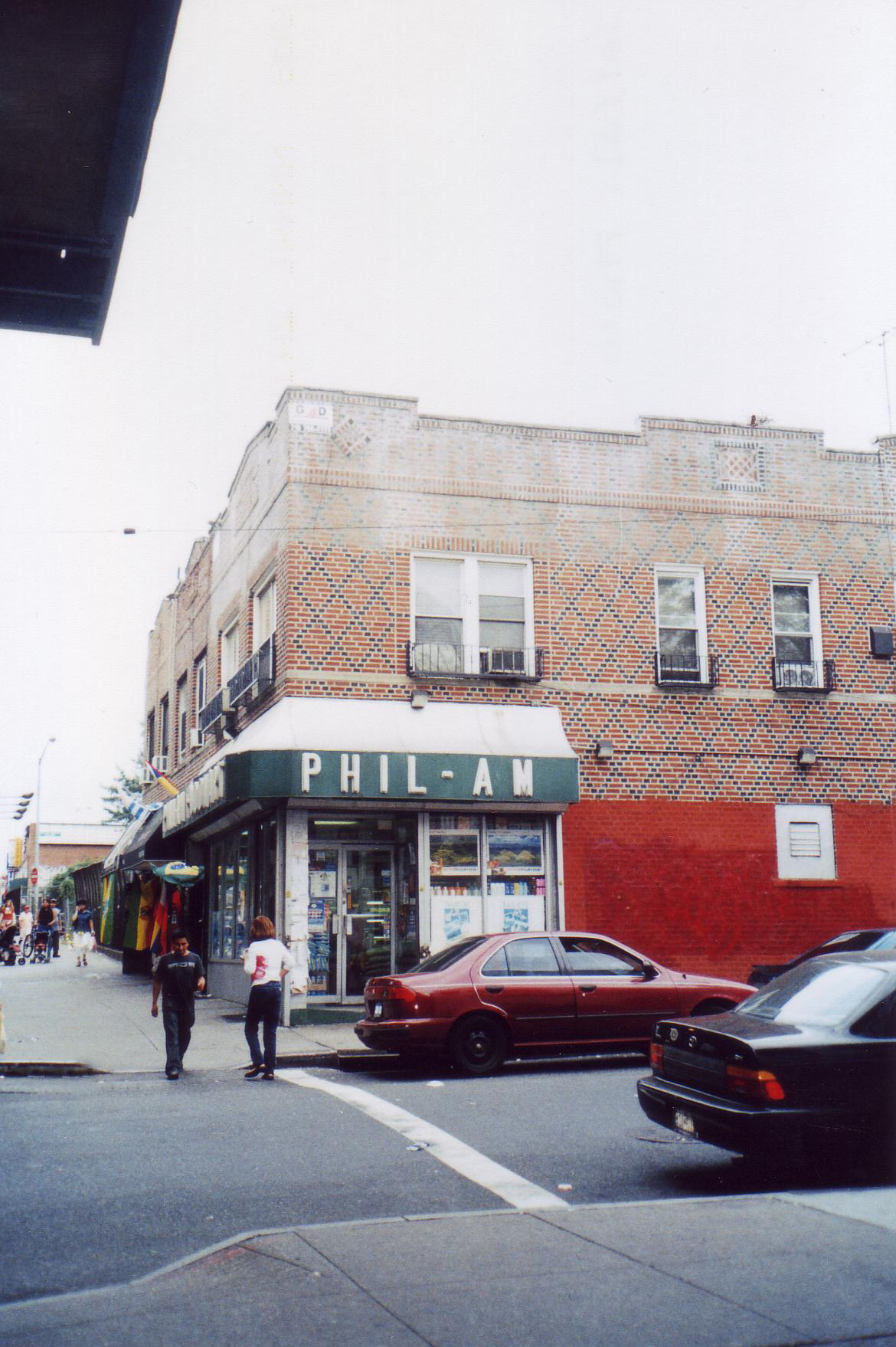
The Phil-Am grocery store in Woodside, Queens, New York

Woodside, Queens is known for its concentration of Filipinos known as Filipinotown or Little Manila. Along the 7 line, known colloquially as the "International Express", the 69th Street station serves as the gateway to Queens' very own Little Manila. This area attracts many local Filipinos and non-Filipinos alike and from neighboring places of Long Island, Connecticut, Pennsylvania, and New Jersey. The coverage of Little Manila is along Roosevelt Avenue, from 63rd Street to 71st Street.

Filipino cafés and restaurants dominate the area, as well as several freight and remittance centers scattered throughout the neighborhood. Other Filipino-owned businesses including professional services (medical, dental, optical), driving schools, beauty salons, immigration services, and video rental places providing the latest movies from the Philippines dot the community.

Restaurants such as Ihawan, Perlas ng Silangan, Renee's Kitchenette, Fritzie's Bakeshop, Fiesta Grill, Barrio Fiesta and Krystal's Cafe, are the most popular ones, while Philippine remittance and shipping centers such as Johnny Air Cargo, FRS, Edwards Travel, Apholo Shippers, Macro, Philippine National Bank, and Metrobank are present in the area.

Establishments such as Eyellusion, Jefelli Photo and Video, Manila Phil-Am Driving, Santos Medical Clinic, Luz-Vi-Minda, Marlyn's Beauty Salon, Marry Indo Beauty Salon, Freddy Lucero Beauty Salon, Dimple Beauty Salon, Bambina Salon, Jan-Mar Technologies, Don's Professional Services, Casino Law Office, Kulay at Gupit, Phil-Am Foodmart, Mabuhay Filipino Store, and Nepa Q Mart serve the Filipino American community.

Jollibee, a famous fast-food chain in the Philippines, opened its first branch in New York in February 2009, selecting Woodside, Queens. Red Ribbon Bakeshop, a sister company of Jollibee, followed suit in January 2010.

BPI, Getz Travel, Lucky Money Remittance, an office of TFC and Papa's Kitchen, that offers KAMAYAN night every Friday and Saturday (featured in The NY Times on October 9, 2013/Dining/Hungry City) on 65th Place & Woodside have also opened in Woodside's Little Manila.

In February 2008, the Bayanihan Filipino Community Center opened its doors in Woodside, a project spearheaded by the Philippine Forum. The Philippine Forum also hosts an annual festival at the Hart Playground in commemoration of Filipino American History Month.

Other Filipino businesses that exist in Woodside but are not within the Little Manila area are Engeline's, a Filipino restaurant at 59th Street and Roosevelt Avenue, Tito Rad's Restaurant at Queens Boulevard and 50th Street, Payag Restaurant on 52nd Street - Roosevelt Avenue, Lourdess Restaurant on 58th Street and 37th Avenue and Papa's Kitchen on 65th Place and Woodside Avenue.

On June 12, 2022, a sign-unveiling ceremony and celebration was held at the intersection of 70th Street and Roosevelt Avenue to commemorate the presence and contributions of the Filipino community in Queens. The corner was co-named "Little Manila Avenue."

===== Manhattan =====
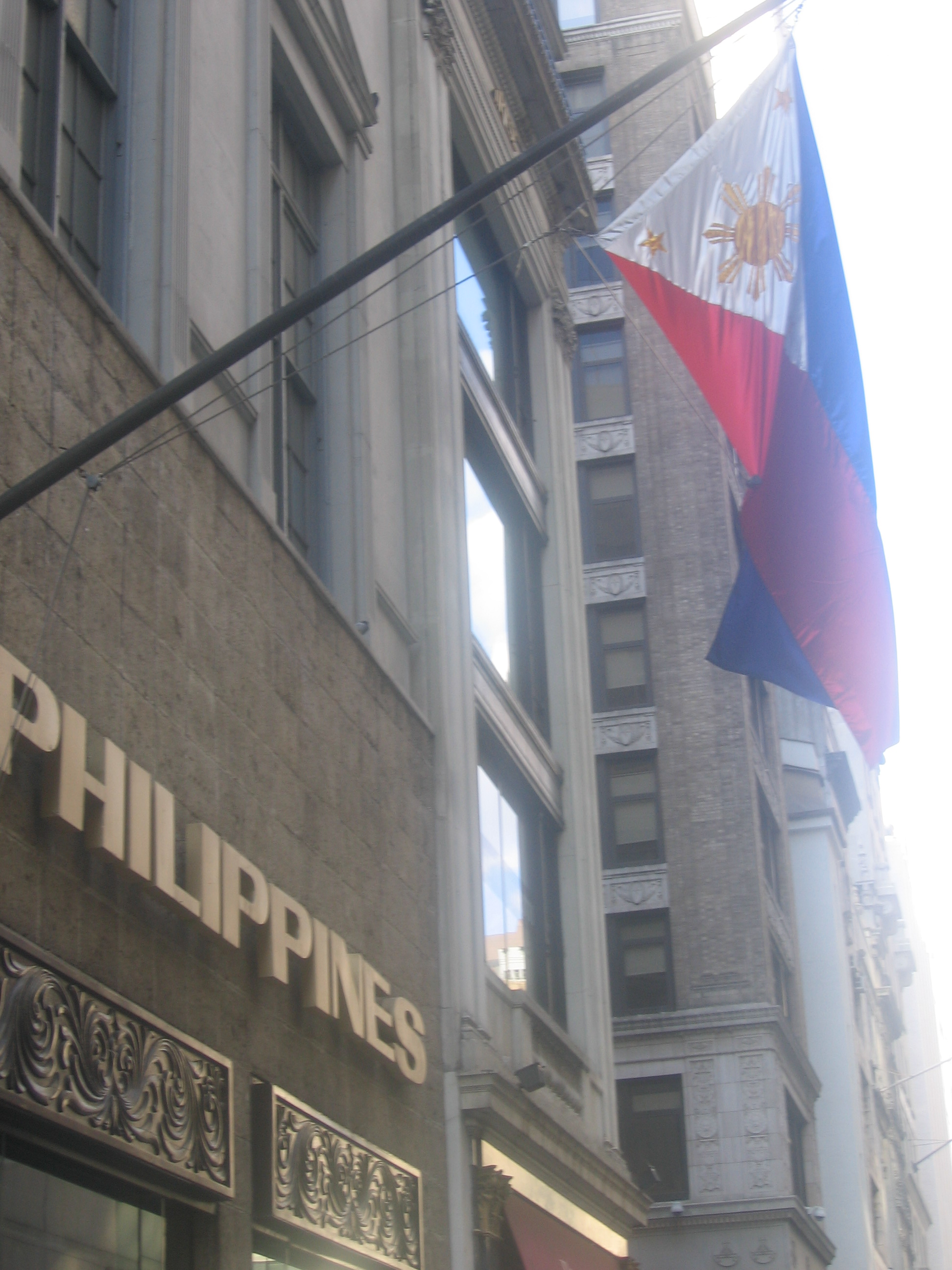
Philippine Center in New York City

The Philippine Consulate of New York has a multipurpose role, aside from its governmental duties and functions, it also caters to many events of the Filipino American community and has a school called Paaralan sa Konsulado (School at the consulate), which teaches new-generation Filipino Americans about their culture and language. It is known just as the Philippine Center instead of the consulate. The Philippine Center's newly renovated large edifice is situated in Fifth Avenue in Manhattan and is open to the public on business days and closed on Philippine and American holidays. The building itself is considered as the largest foreign consulate on the strip of the avenue.

New York City also hosts the annual Philippine Independence Day Parade along Madison Avenue on the first Sunday of June. It is also said to be one of the largest parades of any kind in the city and the largest Philippine celebration in the United States. This celebration is a combination of a parade and a street fair. Madison Avenue bursts on this day with Filipino culture, colors and people and is attended by many important political figures, entertainers, civic groups, etc. Former Mayor Rudy Giuliani and Senator Chuck Schumer are devout attendees of this annual parade.

A Filipino restaurant to open in Manhattan is the Bayan Cafe around Midtown (2006). Grill 21 is a popular Filipino restaurant located on the East Side of Manhattan.

In the East Village and Lower East Side, there was a significant Filipino migration in the late 1980s due to mass recruitment of Filipino medical professionals to area hospitals, notably New York Eye and Ear Infirmary, St. Vincent's Hospital, and Beth Israel Medical Center. Migration was spurred by the hospitals' offer of subsidized housing to employees, in the midst of ongoing rent strikes in the neighborhood. The burgeoning Little Manila centered on 1st Avenue and 14th Street, around which there were, at the peak, a number of grocer and video rental stores and Filipino restaurants within a few blocks of one another. Filipino American community relations were strengthened by local Roman Catholic churches in the East Village and Gramercy area. As rents increased, and properties were taken over by New York University, the number of Filipinos and Filipino businesses in East Village Little Manila waned. Elvie's Turo-Turo, the longest standing Filipino business in the area, closed in late 2009 after almost 20 years of operation. New Filipino business continue to sprout up.

The Archdiocese of New York designated a chapel named after the first Filipino Saint Lorenzo Ruiz de Manila for the Filipino Apostolate. Officially designated as the "Church of Filipinos," or the Chapel of San Lorenzo Ruiz is the second in the United States and only the third in the world dedicated as such.

==== New Jersey ====
A Philippine Grocery in Jersey City, NJ

New Jersey is home to a Filipino population numbering at more than 100,000 statewide, according to the 2000 U.S. Census. This number may have been closing in to the 200,000 level, in 2006, due to a high birth rate among Filipino Americans and 8,000 Filipino immigrants annually. While Filipinos can be found across the state, the commercial districts catering to the Filipino community are found mostly in the state's urban areas.

State and local governments in the Garden State have significant number of employees of Filipino background and they play a vital role in the state's affairs, issues, and commerce. Filipino enclaves exist in Jersey City, Bergenfield, Passaic, Union City and Elizabeth. The Meadowlands Exposition Center in Secaucus hosts the annual Philippine Fiesta, a cultural event that draws Filipinos and non-Filipinos alike from across the New York metropolitan area. The event takes place on the weekend of the second week of August.

===== Jersey City =====
Jersey City is home to a high-profile Little Manila. Seven percent (7%) of Jersey City's population is Filipino. The city's Five Corners district has a thriving Filipino community, which makes up the second largest Asian-American subgroup in the city. Newark Avenue's strip of Filipino culture and commerce dwarfs that of New York City. A variety of Filipino restaurants, shippers and freighters, doctors' offices, bakeries, stores, and even an office of The Filipino Channel have made Newark Avenue their home in recent decades. The largest Filipino-owned grocery store on the East Coast, Phil-Am Food, has been established on the avenue since 1973. An array of Filipino-owned businesses can also be found in Jersey City's West Side section, where many residents are of Filipino descent. In 2006, Red Ribbon Bakeshop, one of the Philippines' most famous food chains, opened a new pastry store in Jersey City—the chain's first branch on the East Coast.

Manila Avenue in Downtown Jersey City was named for the Philippine capital city because of the many Filipinos who built their homes on the street during the 1970s. A memorial dedicated to the Filipino-American veterans of the Vietnam War was built in a small square on Manila Avenue. A park and statue dedicated to Jose P. Rizal, the national hero of the Philippines, can also be found in downtown Jersey City.

Furthermore, Jersey City hosts the annual Philippine–American Friendship Day Parade, an event that occurs yearly on the last Sunday in June. The City Hall of Jersey City raises the Philippine flag in correlation with this event and as a tribute to the contributions of the local Filipino community. The city's annual Santacruzan procession has been held since 1977 along Manila Avenue.

===== Bergenfield =====
Bergenfield is informally known as the Little Manila of Bergen County. Of the 14,224 Filipino population in the county as a whole, 3,133 (22% of the county total) live in Bergenfield. It is home to many Filipino businesses, particularly restaurants and bakeshops. Red Ribbon, a popular bakeshop in the Philippines, will open its second branch in Bergenfield, after Jersey City.

===== Edison =====
Edison, in Middlesex County, New Jersey, has emerged as a growing hub for Filipinos since 2000. A significant number of Filipinos in Middlesex County work in the burgeoning healthcare and other life-science disciplines at Central Jersey's numerous medical and pharmaceutical institutions.

==== Oregon ====
===== Portland and Beaverton =====
Portland is considered as a focal point of Filipino businesses. There are Filipino restaurants and stores in Portland and Beaverton. One Filipino restaurant is called "Tambayan Restaurant and Mart".

==== Hawaii ====
Hawaii is known for its demographic structure, in which it does not have a specific majority group. The Filipino-American community makes up about 23% of the state's entire population and is second to its Japanese-American counterpart. Its geographic confines contain as many as 275,000 Filipinos (according to the 2000 census) and receives a yearly 4,000 new Filipino immigrants.

The Filipino Community Center is the largest Filipino establishment of any kind in the United States. It is celebrating the Filipino Centennial, which commemorates 100 years of Filipino immigration and contributions to the state.

The census designated place of Waipahu, on the island of Oahu, has a majority-Filipino population. Many of them are immigrants of the Philippines, and the streets of Waipahu have many small Filipino-owned businesses. Waipahu could be considered as "Hawaii's Little Manila". 85% of the Filipino American population in Hawaii are of Ilocano descent.

==== Kansas City Metropolitan Area ====
The Kansas City metropolitan area is thought to be home to a Filipino community and it has the Fiesta Filipina event held every June.

==== Texas ====
===== Houston =====
In Houston near the NRG Stadium there is a growing Filipino American Little Manila which contains a Jollibee, Max's Restaurant, and a small Filipino supermarket called Cherry Foodarama. The Houston area has the highest population of Filipino Americans in the South.

==== Newer Filipino communities ====
There has been a surge of Filipino immigration to various cities. The Las Vegas Valley is now home to some 90,000 Filipinos, mostly living in Henderson and Las Vegas, but also other locales in Clark County, Nevada. The article also references the following cities : Seattle, New York City Chicago Orlando, Florida New Orleans Houston Fort Wayne, Indiana Portland, Oregon Virginia Beach, Virginia

== See also ==
- Ethnic enclave
- Overseas Filipino
- Balikbayan box
