= International Hotel (San Francisco) =

Residential hotel in San Francisco

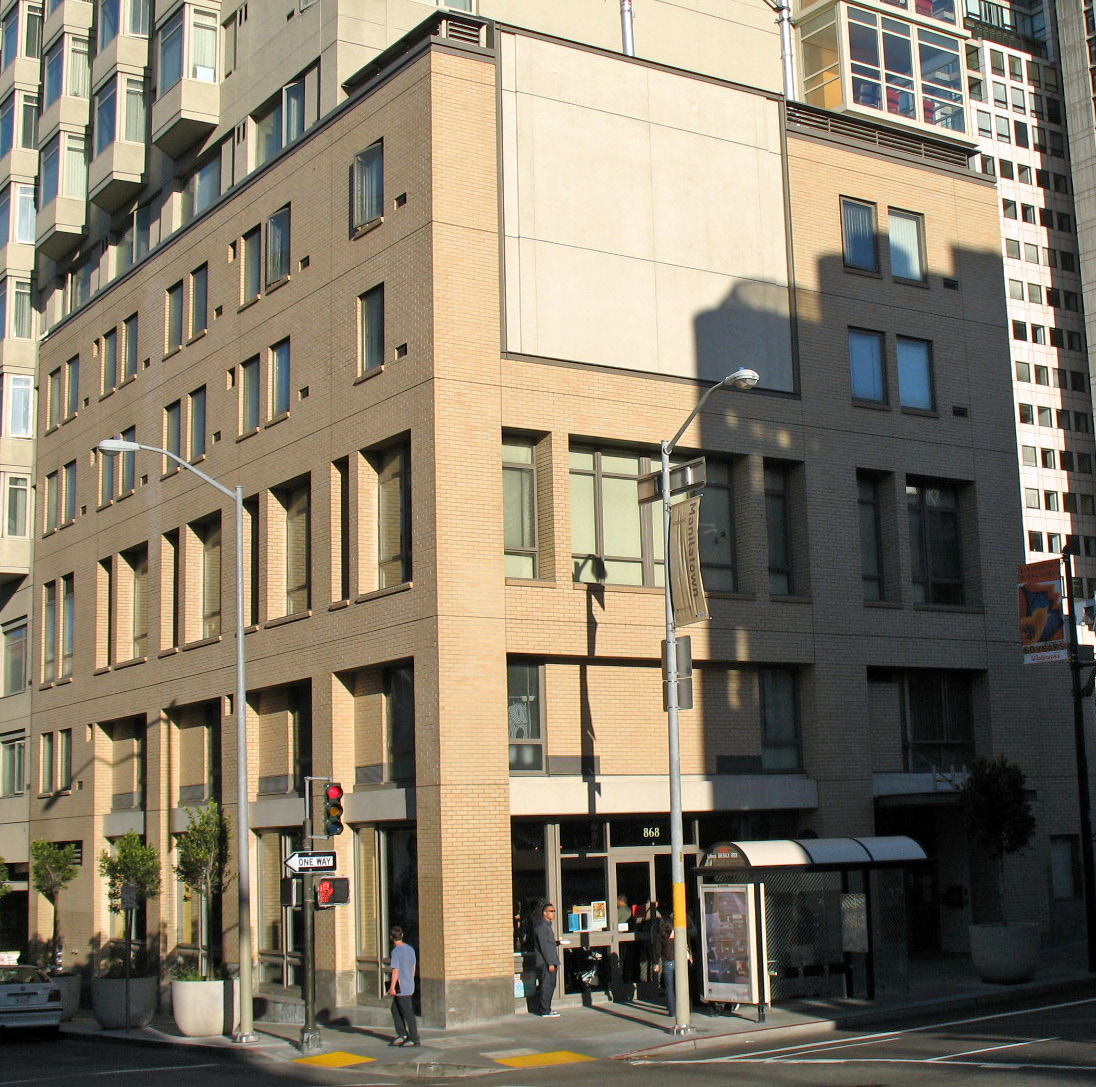
- The fourth incarnation of the International Hotel

- Location within San Francisco Location within California Location within the United States
- Alternative names: I-Hotel

General information
- Architectural style: Contemporary
- Location: San Francisco, California
- Coordinates: 37°47′46″N 122°24′17″W
- Completed: 1954
- Relocated: 848 Kearny Street (1873)
- Renovated: 1907, 2005
- International Hotel
- U.S. National Register of Historic Places
- NRHP reference No.: 77000333
- Added to NRHP: June 15, 1977

The International Hotel, often referred to locally as the I-Hotel, was a low-income single-room-occupancy residential hotel in San Francisco, California's Manilatown. It was home to many Asian Americans, specifically a large Filipino American population. Around 1954, the I-Hotel also famously housed in its basement Enrico Banducci's original "hungry i" nightclub. During the late 60s, real estate corporations proposed plans to demolish the hotel, which would necessitate displacing all of the I-Hotel's elderly tenants.

In response, housing activists, students, community members, and tenants united to protest and resist eviction. All the tenants were evicted on August 4, 1977 and the hotel was demolished in 1981. After the site was purchased by the International Hotel Senior Housing Inc., it was rebuilt and opened in 2005. It now shares spaces with St. Mary's School and Manilatown Center.

== History ==
=== Residential hotel ===
The I-Hotel, originally established as a luxury location for travelers in 1854, relocated to Kearny Street in 1873 and was rebuilt in 1907 after the 1906 San Francisco Earthquake and Fire. During the 1920s and 1930s, thousands of seasonal Asian laborers came to reside at the I-Hotel. The communities and buildings around the I-Hotel grew into a 10-block Filipino American enclave along Kearny Street known as Manilatown, the Manilatown section of San Francisco. During the 1960s, residents were able to rent a room in the hotel for less than $50 a month.

It was well known as a low-cost housing option for Chinese immigrants and Chinatown residents. It was also a frequent gathering place for politically left wing Asian Americans in the Bay Area and beginning 1969 the Asian Community Center operated in one of its basements.

=== Filipino American community and Manilatown ===
The International Hotel, also known as the "I-Hotel", was located in San Francisco's Manilatown. Manilatown, in the 20th century served as a central hub for the Filipino community, functioning as a local cultural center for residents. Many of those who lived there, were typically older Filipino laborers referred as "manongs," who had come to the United States in the 1920s and 1930s in search of work opportunities. These laborers would typically occupy low skilled jobs such as agriculture and low-wage industry roles. During this period, there was heavy restrictive immigration policies and economic limitations that forced many of these elderly low-income laborers to turn their attentions to affordable housing options like the International Hotel.

Previously, what once was a luxury location, had now become an affordable housing option for many low-income Asian Americans. With heavy displacement across the West Coast, Manilatown served a local gather space for the diminishing Philippine community; however, due to huge urban expansion motives, particularly, in Manilatown, led to many losing their homes, but more importantly, a majority losing one of the last spaces for the Filipino American community.

=== Urban renewal ===
Urban renewal projects have historically contributed to the ongoing process of gentrification, destabilization, and displacement of local communities from their place of origin. During the urban renewal and redevelopment movement of the mid-1960s, the International Hotel was targeted for demolition. This "urban renewal" that occurred in response to the end of World War II had destroyed the heart of the Fillmore District, San Francisco, and hundreds of homes and thousands of residents were displaced due to the city's plans to expand the downtown business sector. On an economic level, urban renewal projects aimed to expand local development and increase profits, but led to the erasure of Filipino presence and history through the slow but steady removal of homes, businesses, and centers for organizing in the Chinatown area.

In 1968, Milton Meyer & Co., a real-estate company, issued eviction notices to the I-Hotel tenants, with plans to demolish and replace the I-Hotel with a parking garage. This demolition would happen concurrently with the destruction of ten blocks of low-cost housing, restaurants, barber shops, markets, clubs and other Filipino community businesses.

In October 1973, the Thailand-based Four Seas Investment Corporation bought the I-Hotel with the similar intentions to replace it with more profitable building or structure.

The redevelopment efforts enforced by the city impacted many marginalized communities and low-income individuals such as Manilatown, where many low-income single Filipino immigrants resided. As economic investments started coming in, the city of San Francisco viewed this low-income area as an opportunity to commercialize and generate more revenue. Within a couple of years, what used to be a gathering space for many, became a series of capital investments leading rapid expansion.

At the time, there was a lack of tenant protections that made it extremely difficult for the residents to challenge eviction orders. Despite many activists coming together, redevelopment issues continued to grow. The International Hotel highlighted a huge imbalance between private interest and its inhabitants, which ultimately led to the eviction of many and the complete removal of the once existing I-Hotel.

=== Resistance and eviction ===
After first hearing threats of eviction, the fight over the International Hotel evolved much more than just a tenant, but rather a broader movement emerged. This movement of Filipino American residents at the core was joined by many, including, student activists and local organizations. Amongst those student activists were from nearby schools such as University of California, Berkeley and San Francisco State University. A coalition was formed, reflecting the growth of the Asian American Movement during the late 1960s. While some fought for their homes, many fought for what they thought was bigger, an act to fight against systemic racism and inequality. Threats of eviction completely transformed to community resistance.

The presence of numerous laborers and students underscored the International Hotel's role beyond a residential building, serving as one of the remaining centers for the Filipino American community. Efforts to resist eviction were tied to preserving community identity

For years after the first eviction notices were served in 1968, many individuals were involved in the long fight that took place on the streets, in courtrooms, and in the everyday lives of the I-Hotel Manilatown residents.

In 1969, tenants and activists successfully negotiated an extended lease from Milton Meyer & Co. To finance this lease, Asian American art workshops Kearny Street Workshop and Jackson Street Gallery, as well as other rent-paying cultural organizations and businesses such as Everybody's Bookstore, moved into the basement of the I-Hotel. However, in 1974, tenants received eviction notices from Four Seas Investment Corporation, forcing community organizers to revise their plans to resist eviction.

Community poet and historian Al Robles played a key role in organizing the broad coalition of protesters, as did International Hotel Tenant Association chairperson Emil de Guzman and tenants Wahat Tampao and Felix Ayson. Ed Lee volunteered for the cause by working through the terms of various anti-eviction agreements as an attorney for the Asian Legal Caucus. Asian American student activists from nearby University of California, Berkeley and San Francisco State University also joined the protests, volunteering to repair and repaint the I-Hotel so that it remained habitable for tenants even as the Four Seas Investment Corporation failed to maintain basic utilities.

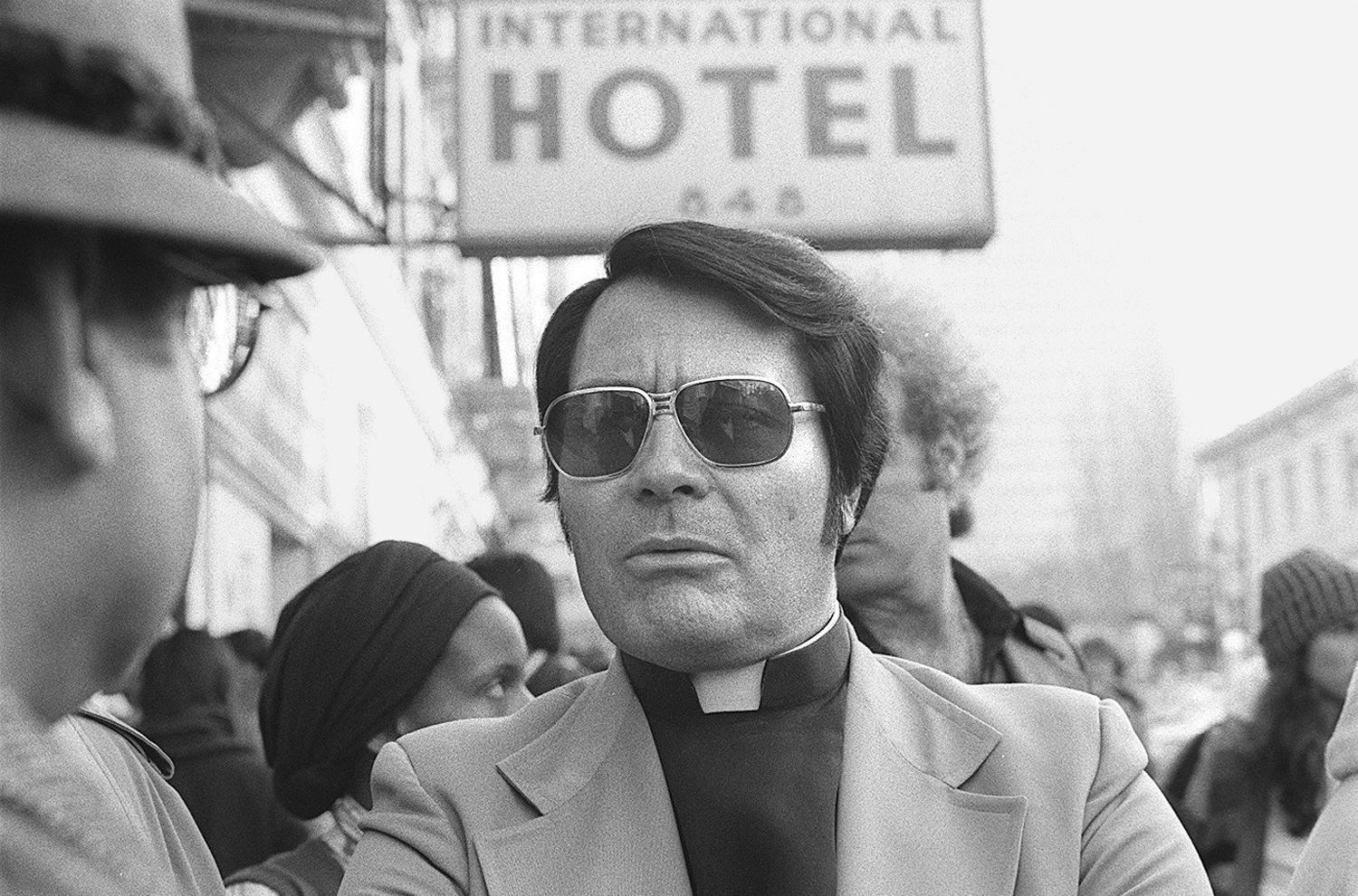
Jim Jones in front of the l-Hotel in January 1977

Controversial Peoples Temple leader Jim Jones also became involved in the fight for the I-Hotel. After Jones was appointed as Chairman of the San Francisco Housing Authority Commission, the Housing Authority voted to acquire the building using $1.3 million in federal funds and then to turn it over to tenants rights groups.

When a court rejected that plan and ordered evictions in January 1977, the Peoples Temple provided two thousand of the five thousand people that surrounded the building, barricaded the doors and chanted "No, no, no evictions!" Sheriff Richard Hongisto, a political ally of Jones, refused to execute the eviction order, which resulted in Hongisto being held in contempt of court and serving five days in his own jail.

In the early morning of August 4, 1977, 400 San Francisco riot police began to physically remove tenants from homes despite the 3,000 protesters attempting to surround and barricade the I-Hotel. Within six hours, all 55 remaining tenants had been evicted. In total, 197 tenants were evicted.

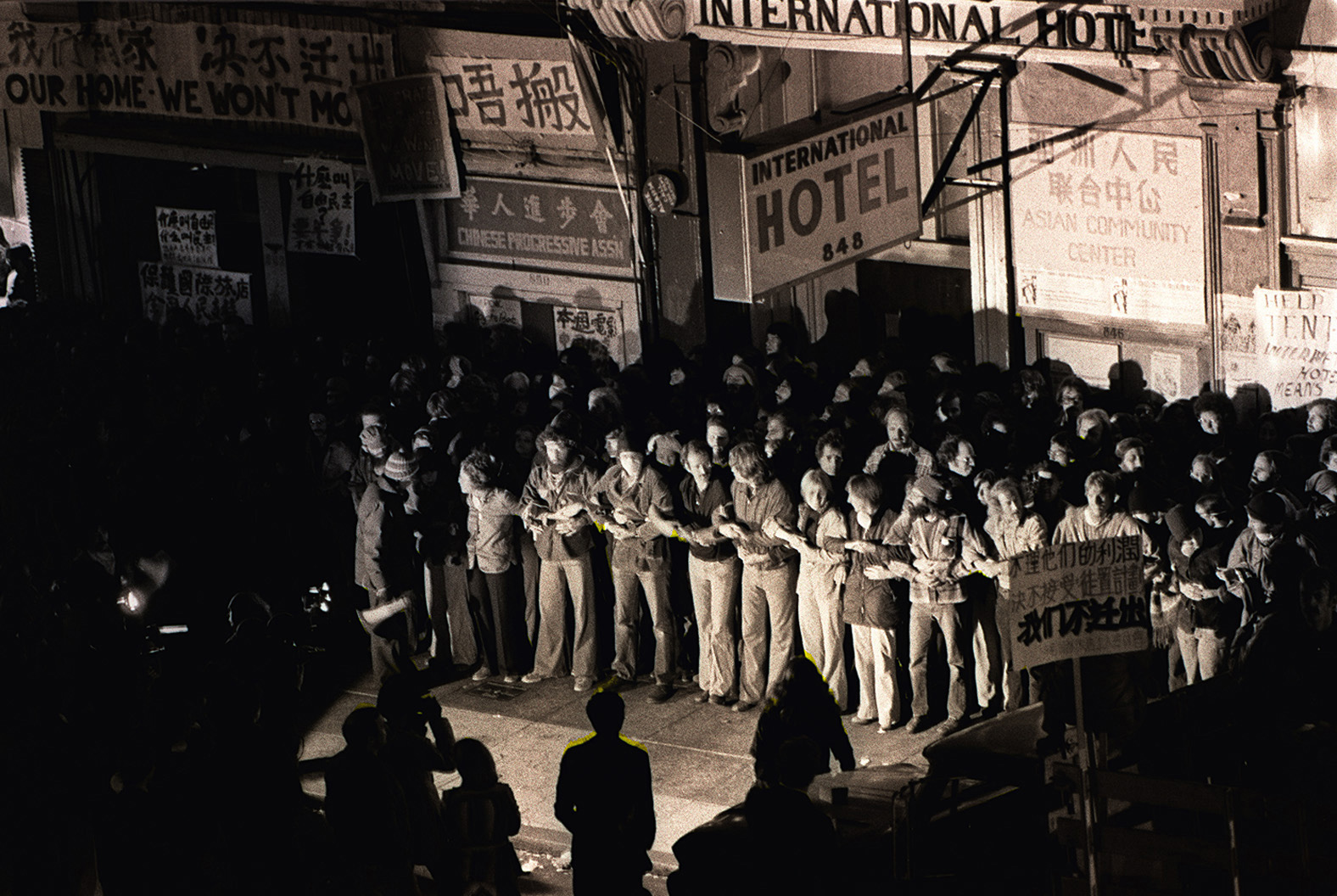
Protestors in front of the I-Hotel on August 4, 1977

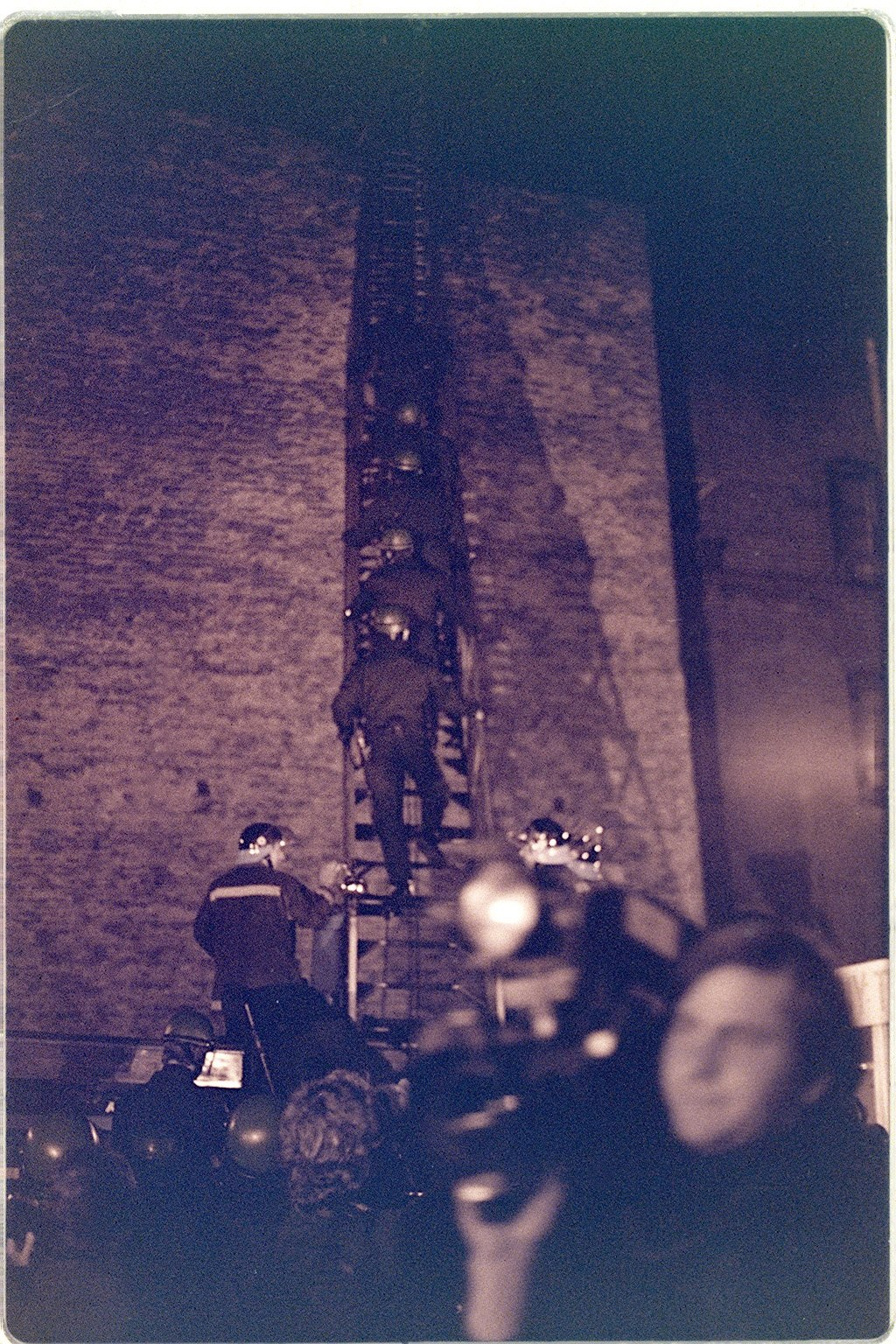
San Francisco Police Department entering the I-Hotel's by ladder

== International Hotel Manilatown Center ==
In 1994, real estate company Pan-Magna sold the I-Hotel land to the Roman Catholic Archdiocese of San Francisco. Subsequently, an $8.3 million grant from the United States Department of Housing and Urban Development was awarded to facilitate development of low-income housing. The Chinatown Community Development Center was chosen to steward this grant.

In 2003, construction began on the new I-Hotel, and the building was completed on August 26, 2005. The new building contains 105 apartments of senior housing. A lottery was held to determine priority for occupancy, with the remaining living residents of the original I-Hotel given priority.

Occupancy started in October 2005, and the new building also contains a ground-floor community center and a historical display commemorating the original I-Hotel. Additionally, a new mural on the site of the new building by Johanna Poethig commemorates tenant activists' struggle to preserve affordable housing in San Francisco. The mural features AL Robles, Etta Moon, and Bill Sorro.

Bill Sorro was a Filipino-American activist born in San Francisco in 1939. His interracial family was affected by miscegenation laws- his father was arrested for marrying a white woman- and his upbringing inspired him to fight for social justice. Sorro fought for housing justice, helped advocate for gay and immigrant rights, and brought women and minorities into the trade unions, of which he worked for 25 years as an iron worker. Sorro was a founder of the Manila Heritage Foundation, an organization that. located former tenants and gave them the opportunity to move back into their previous homes in the I-Hotel after it was remodeled.

=== Legacy and significance ===
After all, the demolition of the International Hotel and the eviction of many residents marked both a moment of loss for many and served as a symbol of unity for those who came together. Through communal efforts, there has been various attempts to restore the site, but more importantly the culture and its history.

In the years following displacement of many, the opening of the new International Hotel in 2005 served as a testament of the impact this movement has had. The International Hotel included affordable housing and that once close-knit community space.

To this day, the International Hotel remains as an important landmark in terms of the influence of Asian American history.

== Depictions in popular culture ==
- Street Music (1981) is a film about a fictional eviction of a similar hotel in the Tenderloin.
- The hotel and its elderly Filipino tenants were in a scene in the 1982 indie film Chan Is Missing by Wayne Wang.
- The Fall of the I-Hotel (1983) is a documentary written and directed by Curtis Choy that chronicles the fight for the I-Hotel and its tenants' eviction. The documentary is narrated by Al Robles.
- The Manilatown Series (2005) is a series of documentaries and short films written and directed by Curtis Choy that traces the eventual rebuilding of the I-Hotel.
- I Hotel (2010), a book by Karen Tei Yamashita, uses the I-Hotel as a setting for many of the ten interconnected novellas which tell stories from the time period of 1968 to 1977.
- "Save the I-Hotel," a short story in author Lysley Tenorio's collection Monstress (2012), features a manong's memories of the I-Hotel prior to eviction.
- Remember the I-Hotel, a play based on Lysley Tenorio's "Save the I-Hotel," was presented by the American Conservatory Theater in November 2015.
- In the sixteenth episode of the fourth season of Barney Miller entitled "Eviction", the plot was loosely based on the events that transpired in the hotel.

== See also ==
- Manilatown
- Kearny Street Workshop
- Kearny Street
- Al Robles
- Asian American movement
- Violeta Marasigan
