= FilCom Center =

The Filipino Community Center (FilCom Center) in Waipahu, Leeward Oahu sits on a 2-acre (8,100 m^{2}) parcel of land gifted by the AmFac Corporation. Its 50,000 sq ft (5,000 m^{2}) structure provides some 26,000 sq ft (2,400 m^{2}) of usable space.

It has three stories of rental space, offices for social, health care services, entrepreneurial, business incubation, and technology center are housed with the FilCom Center. Intergenerational needs, services for the elderly, youth and family are its main focus.

The FilCom Center is the largest Filipino community center outside the Philippines.

== History ==
In 1991, the Filipino Chamber of Commerce of Hawaii initiated the FilCom Center during Anacleto Alcantara's term as president. The FilCom's first president and vice president were Roland Casamina and Eddie Flores Jr., respectively. They were responsible for procuring donations to build the community center. Its executive committee consisted of community volunteers. In June 2002, the FilCom center was formally inaugurated.

In 2012, Rose Churma succeeded Geminiano “Toy” Arre as head of the FilCom Center. Under her term, activities and programs that promoted Filipino culture increased. She stepped down two years later, with Arre serving as interim president for a while.

In 2018, when the center was headed by Franz D. Juan, the FilCom center filed for bankruptcy. Later that year, a federal bankruptcy judge approved a business divorce between the FilCom Center and a prominent local catering company.

In 2022, Jeannie Lum was named executive director.

== Services ==
As the largest Filipino community center outside the Philippines, it provides a range of social and educational services, including Ilokano language immersion courses, citizenship classes, cultural music concerts and more. The center provides also free legal aid. It also hosts festivals, galas, and concerts. During the COVID-19 pandemic, they provided vaccination and testing clinics.

== Donors ==
The FilCom center is a tax-exempt, non-profit organization that was built through donations. At the top of its donor list are Harry and Jeannette Weinberg, the City of Honolulu, the Department of Commerce, the State of Hawaii, and the VA Housing and Urban Development.

In 2015, former vice president Flores Jr. donated $15,000 to the Center.

== See also ==
- Little Manila
