= Manilatown, San Francisco =

Neighborhood in San Francisco

Manilatown was a Filipino American neighborhood in San Francisco (i.e., a Little Manila), which thrived from the 1920s to late 1970s. The district encompassed a three block radius around Kearny and Jackson Streets, next to Chinatown. The neighborhood was known for the International Hotel ("I Hotel"), a single-room occupancy (SRO) hotel where many of the residents lived. Manilatown was also home to many businesses that catered to the Filipino American community, such as Manila Cafe, New Luneta Cafe, Bataan Lunch, Casa Playa, Sampagita Restaurant, Blanco's Bar, Lucky M. Pool Hall, and Tino's Barber Shop. At its height, over 1,000 residents lived in Manilatown, and it contained a total of 30,000 transient laborers. From the late 1960s–1970s, the neighborhood was transformed by city initiatives, including the San Francisco Redevelopment Agency, that aimed to gentrify the area, in order to build high-rise offices and luxury apartments in its place. Protest efforts by the residents of Manilatown and other communities and organizations were launched in order to combat these changes, but were ultimately unsuccessful. By 1977, the neighborhood had been largely destroyed, and it became part of Chinatown. Today, San Francisco has Filipino community in South of Market, Tenderloin and the Peninsula's Filipino community is largely centered in southern part of the city, such as in Crocker-Amazon and in the Excelsior District, Mission District, Outer Mission, Visitacion Valley, San Mateo County cities such as Daly City, San Bruno, Colma, Brisbane, Millbrae and South San Francisco.

== History ==
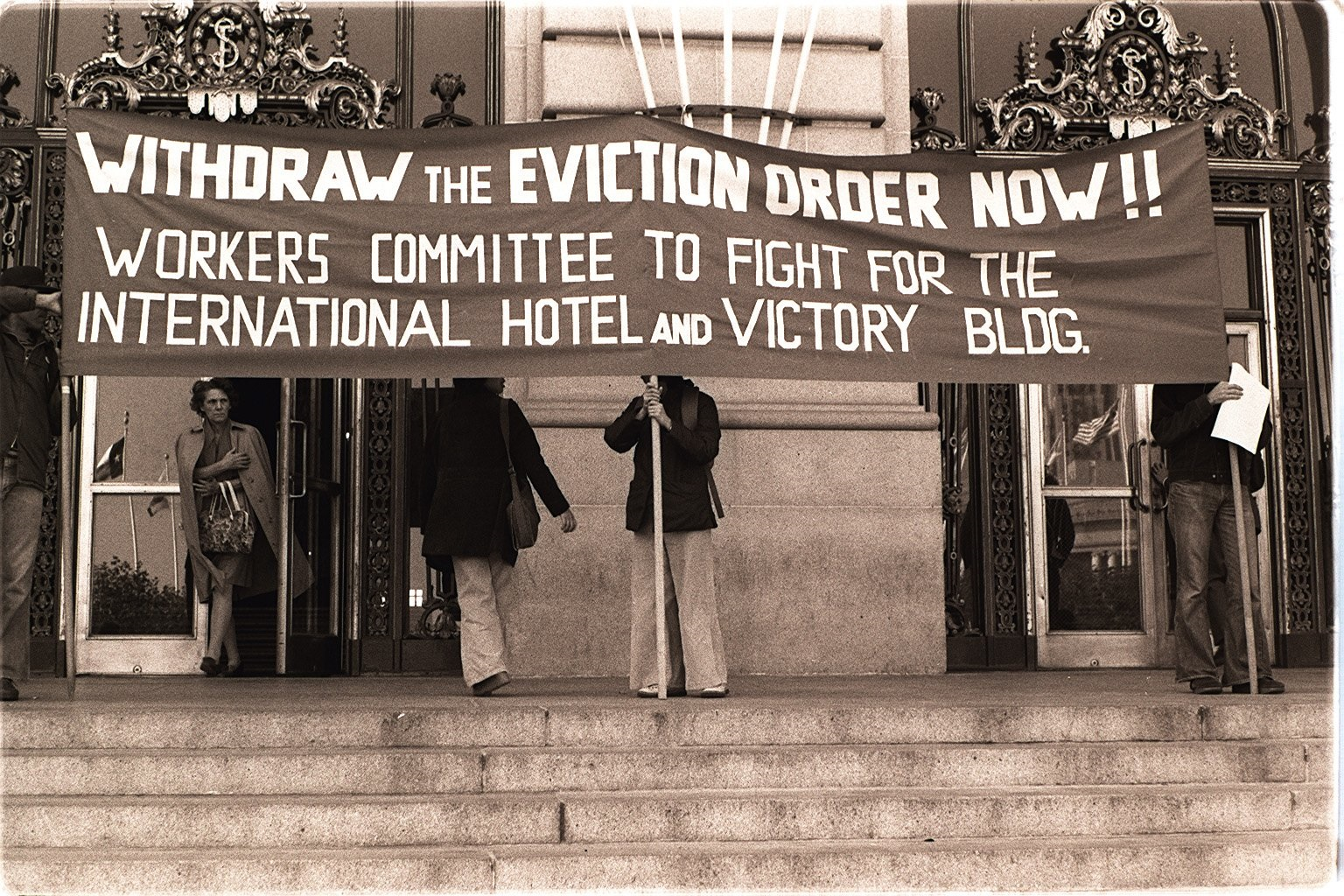
Housing activists protest outside San Francisco City Hall, 1977

The early generation of Manilatown residents were known as the manong generation. Manong is an Ilocano term that means "elder brother." They were the first generation of Filipinos to emigrate to the United States, en masse, and form local communities, beginning in the 1900s. During this time, the United States was heavily involved in the Philippines, with the Philippine–American War (1899–1902) and the American colonization of the Philippines (1898–1946). Typically, manong were recruited from the Philippines to perform low-wage agricultural work in California, Hawaii, and Alaska. By the 1930s, approximately 30,000 manong worked in farms and canneries in Salinas, Watsonville, Modesto, Delano, and other parts of California.

Many of these Filipino immigrants were bachelors. Due to anti-miscegenation laws and restrictions on immigration (such as Immigration Act of 1924), they often could not start families. For this reason, they chose to live amongst each other and formed their own communities, such as Manilatown. Beginning in the 1920s, they formed associations, such as the Caballeros de Dimas-Alang and the Gran Oriente Filipino Masonic, as well.

Many residents of Manilatown were not full-time residents of San Francisco. Rather, they were seasonal workers, who worked in farms and salmon canneries during on-season, and who would then come to San Francisco to work temporary service jobs off-season. They often worked in hotels and restaurants, as cooks, waiters, bellhops, cleaners, and chauffeurs, when in San Francisco. The majority lived in residential hotels, such as the International Hotel, Palm Hotel, and Columbia Hotel.

However, the neighborhood was also occupied by long-term residents, and some of them were business owners. For example, New Luneta Cafe, which was located on Kearny Street, served Filipino cuisine like chicken adobo, pancit, and rice. The cafe was run by Maria Velasco Basconcillo and her husband. New Luneta Cafe supported an underground community of gamblers, who played rummy and poker, as well. Between 1943 and 1949, Canuto Salaver, Clem Mateo and Mike Zacarias were the original co-founders and co-owners of the famed Bataan Lunch restaurant at 836 Kearny Street, and also years later the Bataan Pool Parlor at 840 Kearny Street. Bataan Lunch was originally located at 643 Kearny St., the site of Jessie's Lunch where Clem worked as a cook. Coming together as owners, they renamed their restaurant in 1943 after the Bataan Peninsula and in remembrance of the infamous Bataan Death March which took place in April 1942. Canuto, Clem and Mike were part of a handful of Filipinos who owned and operated a business in San Francisco at that time. In 1944, Bataan Lunch moved next to the I-Hotel. In 1969, this restaurant location would become the home of the famed Mabuhay Restaurant owned by Ness Aquino. Some businesses, like Lucky M. Pool Hall (managed by Manuel Muyco and his wife, Margaret) and Tino's Barber Shop (owned by Faustino "Tino" Regino), served as community centers and employment centers, and they often posted job listings on their walls. The neighborhood was known for its many gambling operations, but the Hall of Justice and San Francisco Police Department (located only a block away) never shut down such operations.

Manilatown began to face serious threats in the 1960s, as city officials pushed for a "Manhattanization" of San Francisco's Financial District and surrounding areas. The plan, the Financial District Redevelopment Project, aimed to remove many low-income tenants and historic buildings, replacing them with modern skyscrapers and luxury housing for affluent residents, including buildings like the TransAmerica Pyramid. The leader of this movement was M. Justin Herman, the head of the San Francisco Redevelopment Agency. Herman had also led the initiative to gentrify the Fillmore district and evict many of its African American residents in the 1960s. When speaking of the International Hotel, Herman said, "This land is too valuable to permit poor people to park on it," wishing to instead transform the area that the hotel stood on into a parking lot for the new businesses set to be moved or constructed in the area. In around a decade, Manilatown and its surroundings lost four thousand building units to the Financial District Redevelopment Project.

Beginning in 1965, a new wave of Filipino immigrants came to San Francisco. The Immigration and Nationality Act of 1965 removed the former quota system, which had strictly regulated the number of Asian immigrants who could come to the United States. Furthermore, in 1969, San Francisco Unified School District established a Filipino Education Center (FEC), as part of the Bilingual Education Act.

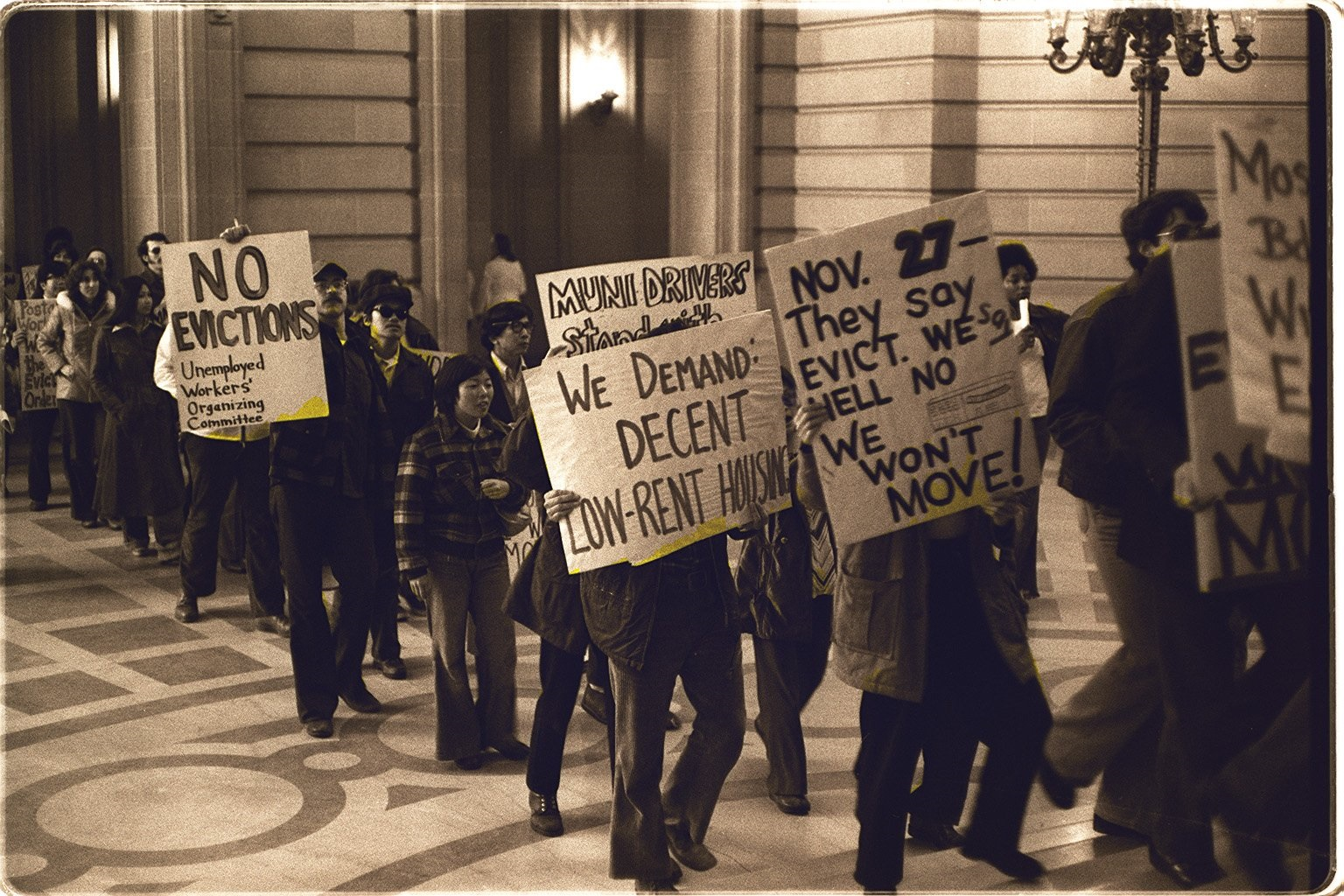
Housing protesters at San Francisco City Hall, 1977

==== The International Hotel Evictions ====
Despite these developments, the community continued to face severe gentrification pressures. For this reason, in 1968, 150 elderly Filipino and Chinese tenants launched an anti-eviction and tenants rights campaign to defend the neighborhood and International Hotel. These tenants, represented by the United Filipino Association, were able to obtain a lease agreement from Milton Meyer & Co., the building's owner at the time, set to be signed on March 16, 1969. However, a fire of dubious origins broke out in the north wing of the hotel's top floor, ultimately killing 3 tenants, Pio Rosete, Marcario Salermo, and Robert Knauff, before its containment. Milton Meyer & Co. would use this fire to justify their rescinding of the lease, as well as using it as support for their demolition plans. Later, many people joined the protests, including grassroots and Asian American activists, Bay Area Gay Liberation Front, and Peoples Temple. Student activists from San Francisco State and UC Berkeley also joined the protest efforts. The protesters were inspired the civil rights movement of the era. Local Filipino businesses supported the protesters, but they often did not directly participate in them, as they could not endure the financial hardship of closing shop and joining the picket line. However, Ness Aquino, owner of Mabuhay Gardens, a Filipino restaurant, became an active member of the United Filipino Association (UFA). The activists were at odds with the corporate owners of the building (Milton Meyer & Co. and then Four Seasons Investment Corporation of Thailand), which wanted to demolish the building in order to build a parking lot. Later, the owners wanted to build a commercial high-rise on the land. Unlike the negotiations with Milton Meyer & Co., tenants were unable to secure a lease agreement with Four Seasons Investment Corporation of Thailand. San Francisco Sheriff Richard Hongisto would be ordered by the Supreme Court to evict the tenants. He initially resisted, and was jailed for 5 days for contempt of court before complying.

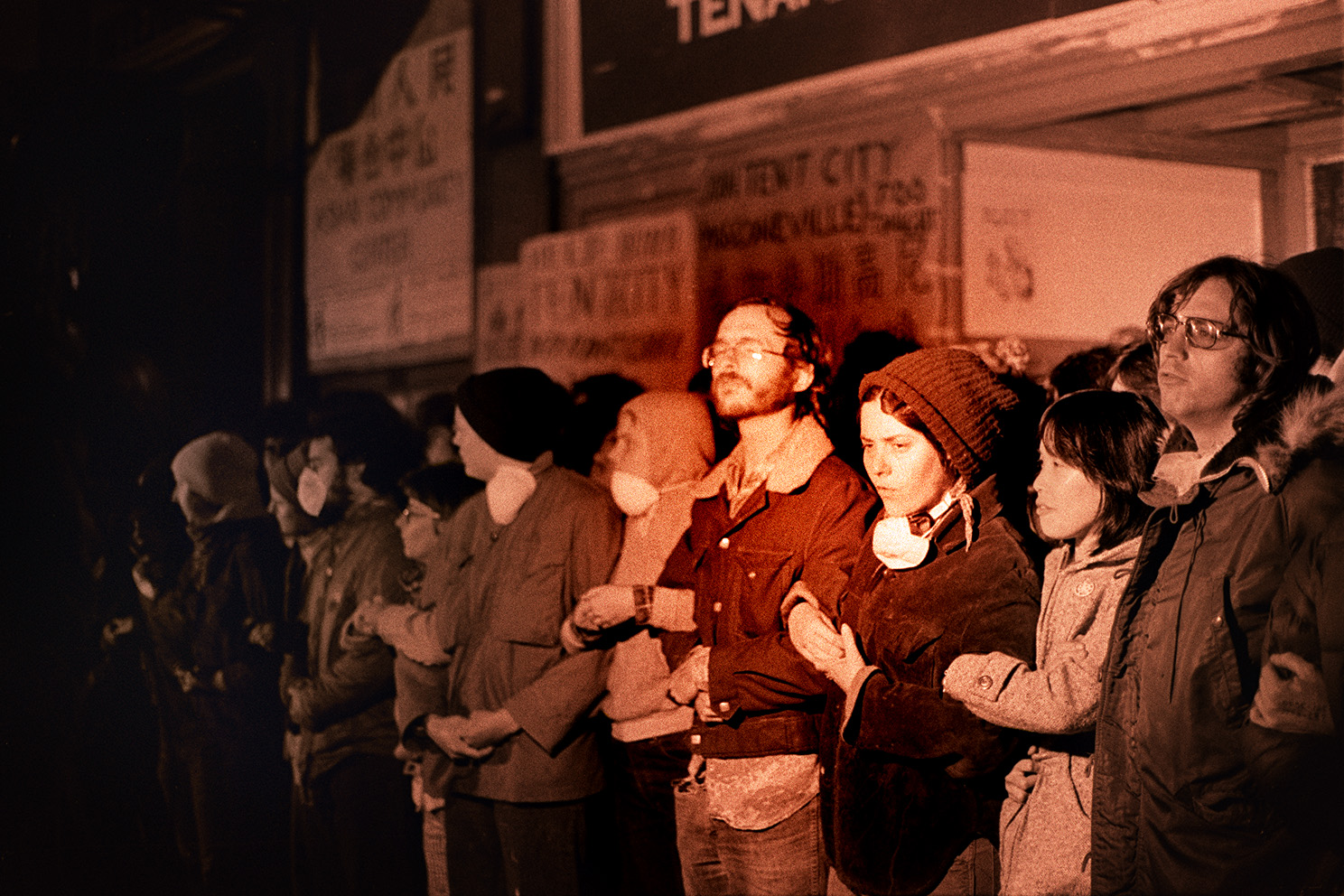
Demonstrators at the International Hotel in San Francisco, 1977

From 1968–1977, the residents were gradually evicted from the International Hotel. The final residents were evicted in 1977, when a government ordered riot police force of 400 led an eviction raid on August 4 at 3:00 am. Although, the police were met with resistance from a 3,000 member human shield, with 100 tenants and supporters forming a barricade from within the hotel. However, the tenants rights activism that came out of their evictions helped rent control laws be established in San Francisco in 1979. With the last eviction of International Hotel residents, the last vestige of Manilatown was largely decimated.

== Commemoration ==
The International Hotel location was unoccupied for over twenty years. In 2004, a two-block corridor of Kearny Street was named "Manilatown", following a proposal from San Francisco Supervisor Aaron Peskin. The proposal was meant to remind residents of its history and commemorate the former vibrancy of the neighborhood. In 2005, the former International Hotel building became a senior housing facility, and it became the home to the Manilatown Heritage Foundation, which advocates for social and economic justice for Filipinos in the United States. The executive director of the center, Evelyn Luluquisen, told the San Francisco Examiner, "This building is a symbol of the perseverance and commitment of the anti-eviction movements in Manilatown. The center symbolizes that the community will always have a presence here." In October 2013, the center turned down an award from then-mayor Ed Lee in celebration of Filipino American History Month. Their rejection was due to concerns over evictions of low-income seniors in San Francisco, particularly Filipino American seniors.
