= Philippine Center =

Agency of the Philippine Government in the United States

Philippine Center New York
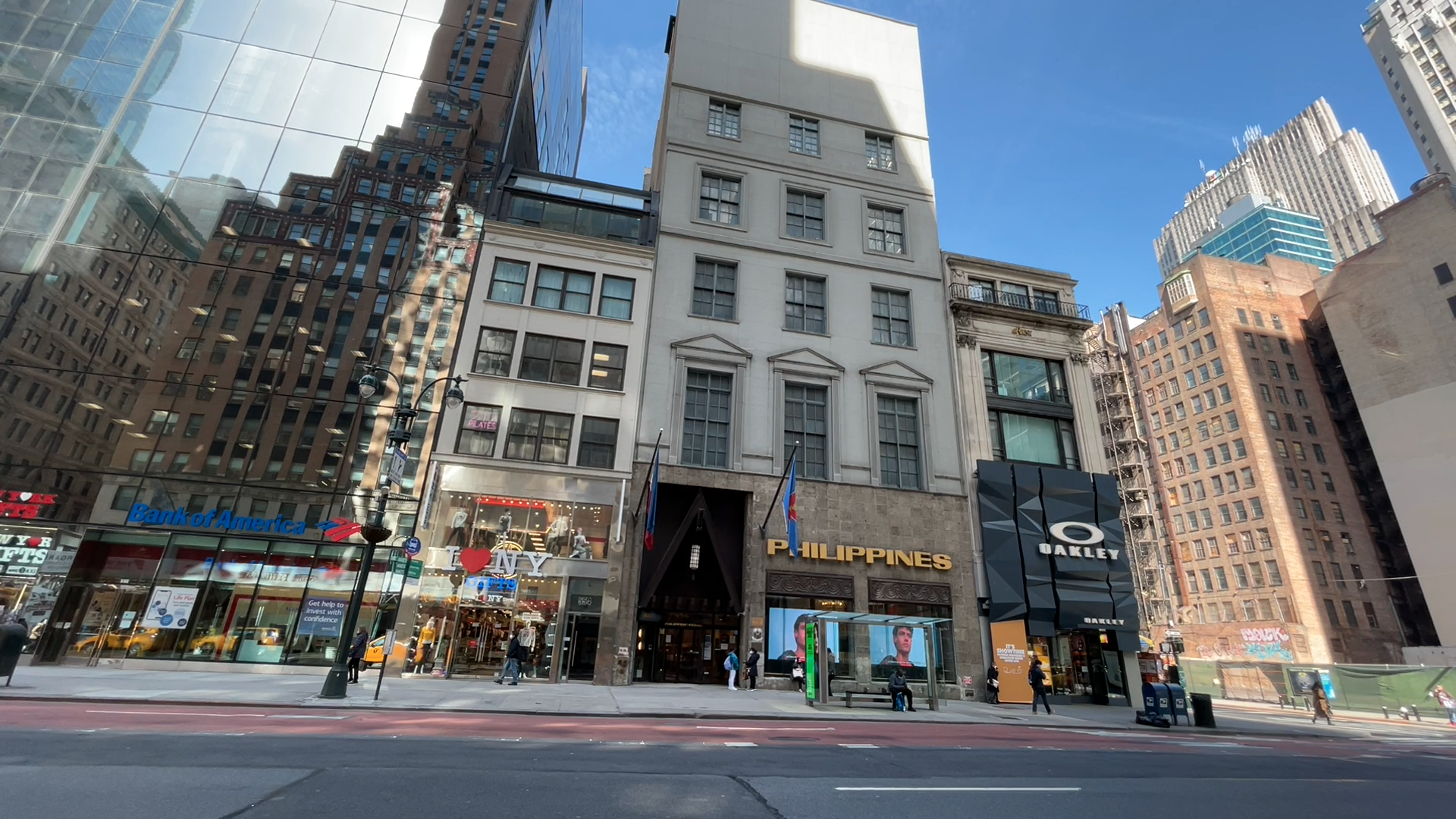
- Location: New York, New York 10036, United States
- Address: 556 Fifth Avenue
- Coordinates: 40°45′21.28″N 73°58′45.74″W
- Website: http://philippinecenterny.com

Philippine Center San Francisco
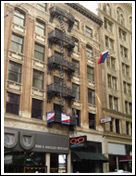
- Location: San Francisco, California, 94108, United States
- Address: 447 Sutter Street
- Website: https://philippinecentersanfrancisco.com/

The Philippine Center is an agency of the Philippine Government in New York City and San Francisco in the United States. The New York City structure houses the Philippine Mission to the United Nations, the Philippine Consulate General, and the overseas offices of the Department of Trade and Industry and the Department of Tourism. The Philippine Center Management (PCMB) manages the building and its properties. It is committed to "nurture, promote, and propagate Philippine culture, encourage foreign tourists to visit the Philippines, expand foreign markets of Philippine products, and enhance the image of the Philippines."

== History ==
On May 10, 1973, the first Philippine Center was established in New York by the then President Ferdinand Marcos on the Presidential Decree No. 188 with the aim of integrating and coordinating activities of the Philippine government offices in the United States. It is located at 556 Fifth Avenue, Manhattan, three blocks south of Rockefeller Center and north of the New York Public Library Main Branch in Bryant Park. It was purchased by the Philippine Government from the Knights of Columbus on October 29, 1973. After the purchase, extensive renovations were done and the interior of the building was redesigned. It became famous for "the only building on Fifth Avenue with no windows".

The second establishment was placed in San Francisco during 1974, and the third was placed in Sydney, Australia.

After Marcos' death in 1989, the Philippine Center continued under the Presidential Decree No. 188. It has become to many Filipinos overseas as an international landmark representing the cultural identity of the Philippines or what some may call, "a home away from home".

On September 15, 2005, President Gloria Macapagal Arroyo made a historic official visit to the Philippine Center New York, the first by a ruling Filipino head of state.

== New York structure ==
During the 1920s to the 1950s, the present edifice was the flagship site of the defunct Schrafft's which was also a chocolate candy company. Carrere & Hastings, the renowned beaux-arts architectural firm originally designed the building for the Knoedler and Company Art Gallery in 1912. Carrere & Hastings were the architects of the New York Public Library, and the Frick Mansion.

The Philippine Center has seven floors, two mezzanines, and a basement. The Kalayaan Hall (Freedom Hall), an auditorium which seats one hundred fifty, is the main reception hall. It also houses an Annex room, an art exhibit area (Philippine Center Gallery) located at the lobby. The upper floors are rented by offices belonging to the Government of the Republic of the Philippines.

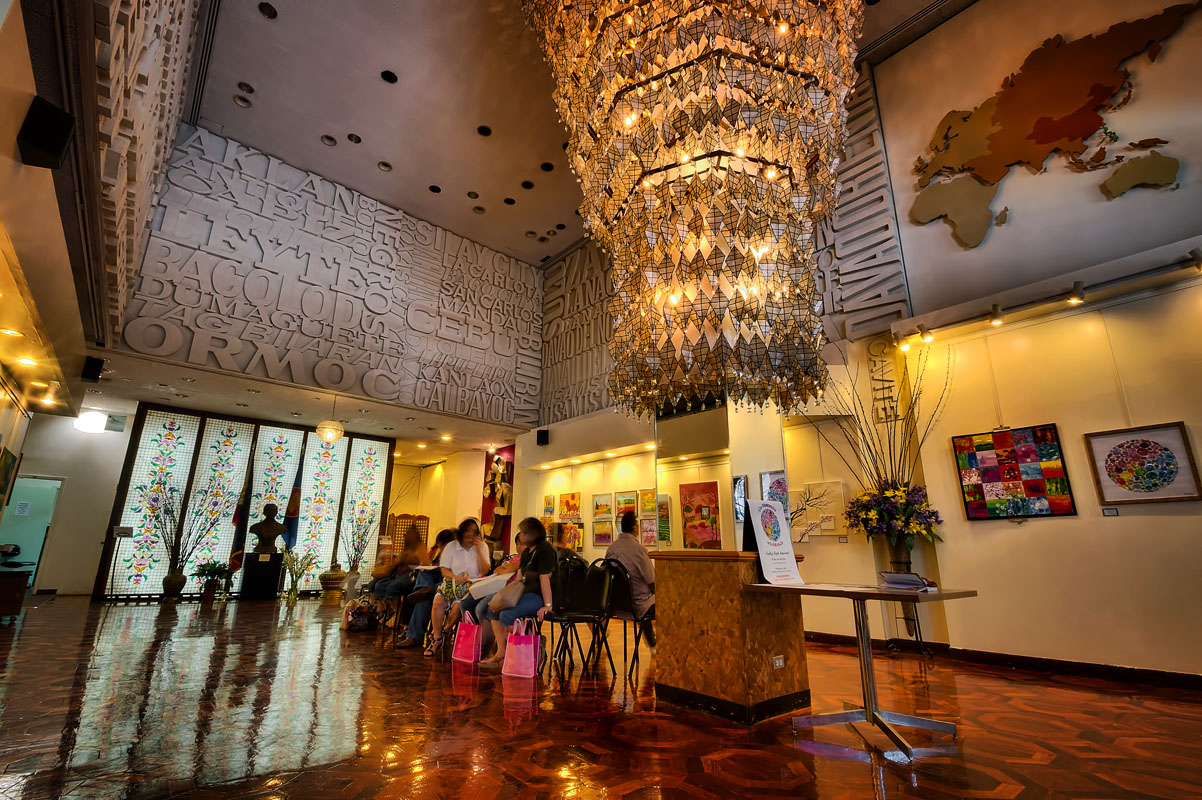
Philippine Center Gallery

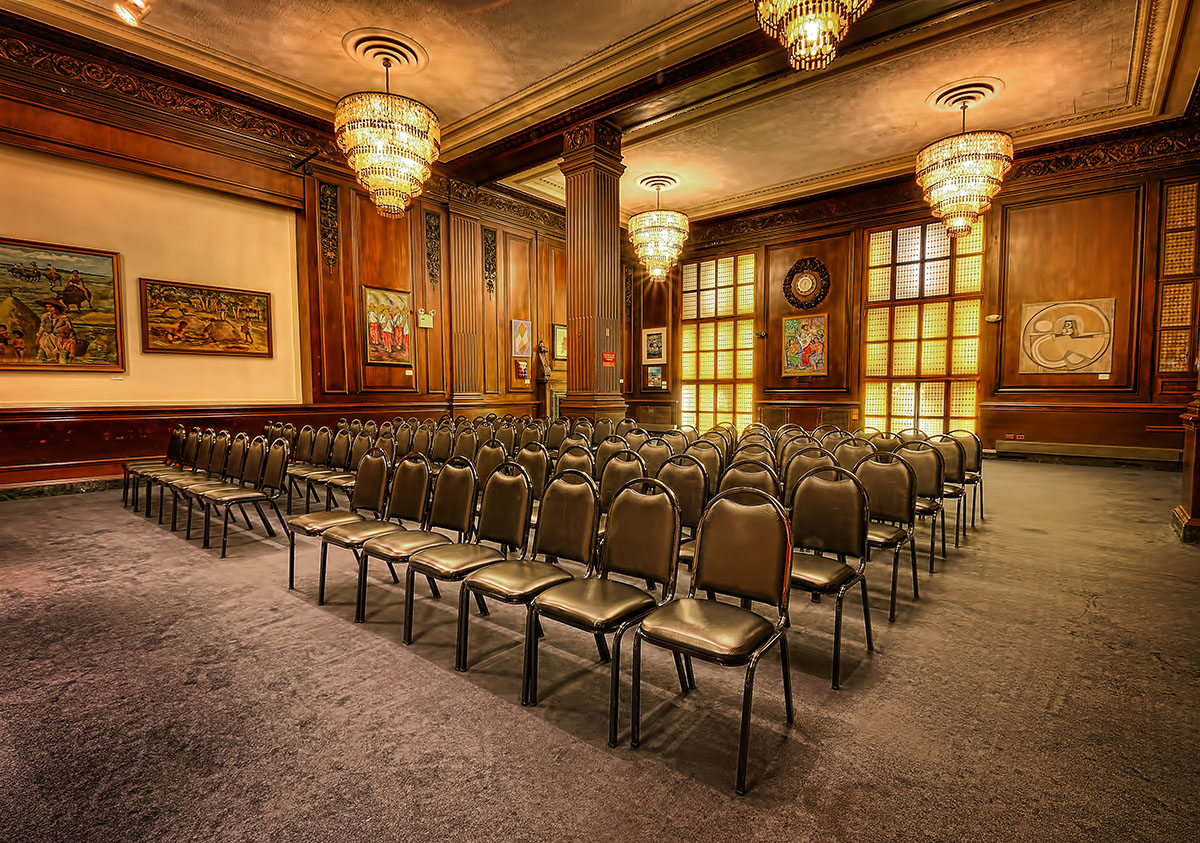
Philippine Center Kalayaan Hall

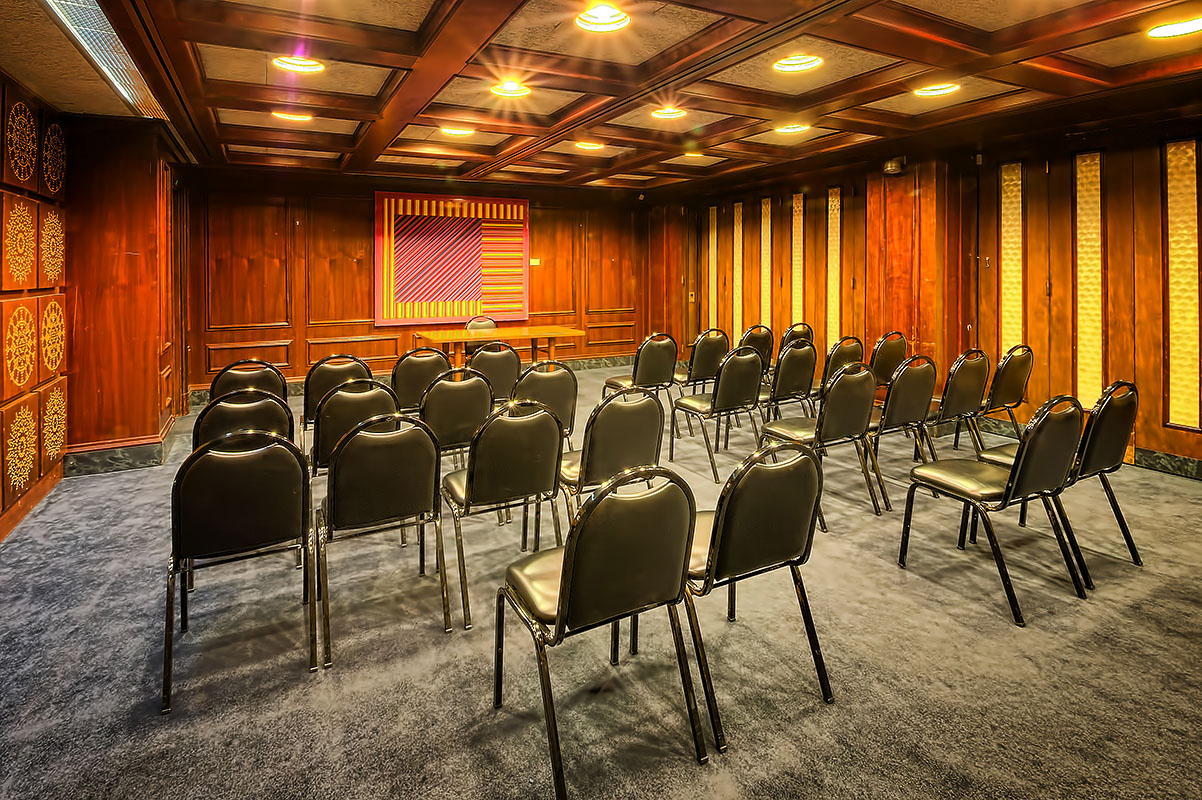
Philippine Center Annex

== San Francisco structure ==
The Philippine Center in San Francisco was built in 1911 by architect Fred Meyer. and encompasses a total floor area of 88,443 square feet (8,216.6 m^{2}). It is composed of two adjoining buildings located on Sutter Street, a block away from the prestigious Union Square and within a mile of San Francisco's financial district. It has 8 floors with a north and south penthouse.

== Purpose ==
The Philippine Center was created to:

- consolidate, integrate and coordinate all activities for all Philippine Government offices and agencies internationally during the Marcos era.
- nurture, promote and propagate Philippine culture
- encourage foreign tourists to visit the Philippines
- expand foreign markets of Philippine products
- enhance the image of the Philippines
- house within its premises all the offices and agencies in New York of the Philippine Government

== Philippine Government offices ==
The following government offices are housed in the New York Philippine Center:

- Permanent Mission to the United Nations
- Consulate-General in New York
- Department of Trade and Industry
- Department of Tourism
- Social Security Services
- Philippine Center Management Board (PCMB)

The following government offices are housed in the San Francisco Philippine Center.

- Consulate-General in San Francisco
- Department of Trade and Industry
- Department of Tourism

== New York Art Collection ==
From June 3–15, 2007, the Philippine Consulate-General and the Philippine Center Management Board exhibited the building's art collection for the first time in its 34 years of existence. The collection includes works by National Artists such as Hernando R. Ocampo, Vicente Manansala, Cesar Legaspi, Arturo Luz, Ang Kiukok and Jose Joya.

The works of Manuel Rodriguez, the Father of Philippine Printmaking, Venancio C. Igarta, Hugo C. Yonzon II, Malang, Federico Aguilar Alcuaz, Angelito Antonio, Norma Belleza, Eduardo Castrillo and Juvenal Sanso were also displayed. The art collecting project of the New York Philippine Center begun since its opening on November 14, 1974. Some art masterpieces were donated by the artists themselves. The public exhibit was officially presented as Pamana: Modernong Sining (A Heritage of Modern Art), to celebrate the 109th anniversary of the Philippine Declaration of Independence.

== See also ==
- Little Manila
- Filipinos in the New York metropolitan area
- Embassy of the Philippines, Washington, D.C.
- Chapel of San Lorenzo Ruiz
- Philippine Independence Day Parade
- New York Filipino Film Festival
