= New York Filipino Film Festival =

The New York Filipino Film Festival is a week-long event that features an array of Filipino-oriented and Filipino-made movies in New York City's ImaginAsian Theatre. This event correlates with the celebration of Philippine Independence in June.

It shows newly released Filipino films and old classics from the Philippines, as well as documentaries, shorts, and original works by young Filipino American filmmakers. The festival was conceived to coincide with the Philippine Independence Day Parade celebration in June.

The film festival is also celebrated in October to correspond to the Filipino American History Month. This event is a combined effort of the Smithsonian Institution, the Cultural Center of the Philippines, and the Consulate General of the Philippines in New York.

== See also ==
- Filipino American
- Philippine Independence Day Parade
- Filipinos in the New York metropolitan area
