= Filipino American Museum =

Museum in New York City

Filipino American Museum (FAM)
- Established: 2013
- Location: New York, New York
- Director: Nancy A. Bulalacao-Leung
- Website: www.filipinoamericanmuseum.com

The Filipino American Museum (abbreviated FAM) was a roving museum in New York City that features programming related to Filipino American arts, music, and culture.

== History ==
Founded in October 2013 in New York City, the museum aims to support “contemporary Filipino-American arts and the roots and traditions of the Philippine diaspora.”

== See also ==
- Filipinos in the New York metropolitan area
- List of museums and cultural institutions in New York City
