= San Lorenzo Ruiz Chapel (New York City) =

Catholic church in Manhattan, New York

Coordinates: 40°43′13.6″N 73°59′46.8″W

Chapel of San Lorenzo Ruiz
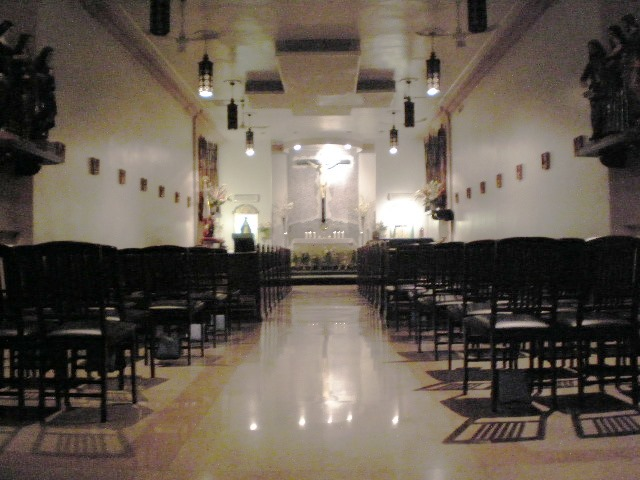
- interior (2008)

General information
- Location: 378 Broome Street; Nolita, Manhattan, New York City, U.S.
- Construction started: 1925
- Completed: 1926
- Cost: $40,000 (1925)
- Client: Roman Catholic Archdiocese of New York

Design and construction
- Architect: Robert J. Reiley
- Engineer: ?

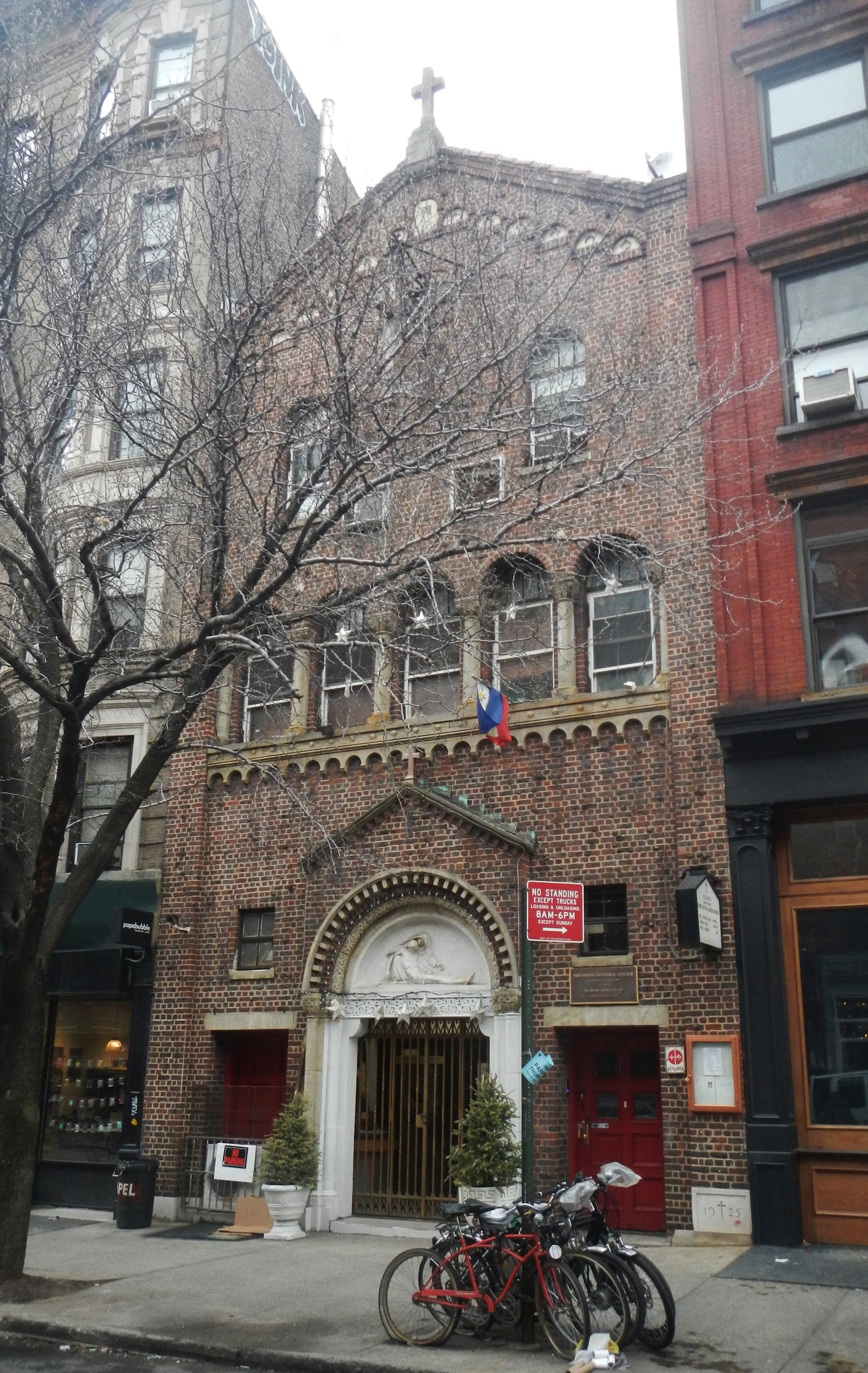
378 Broome Street (2013)

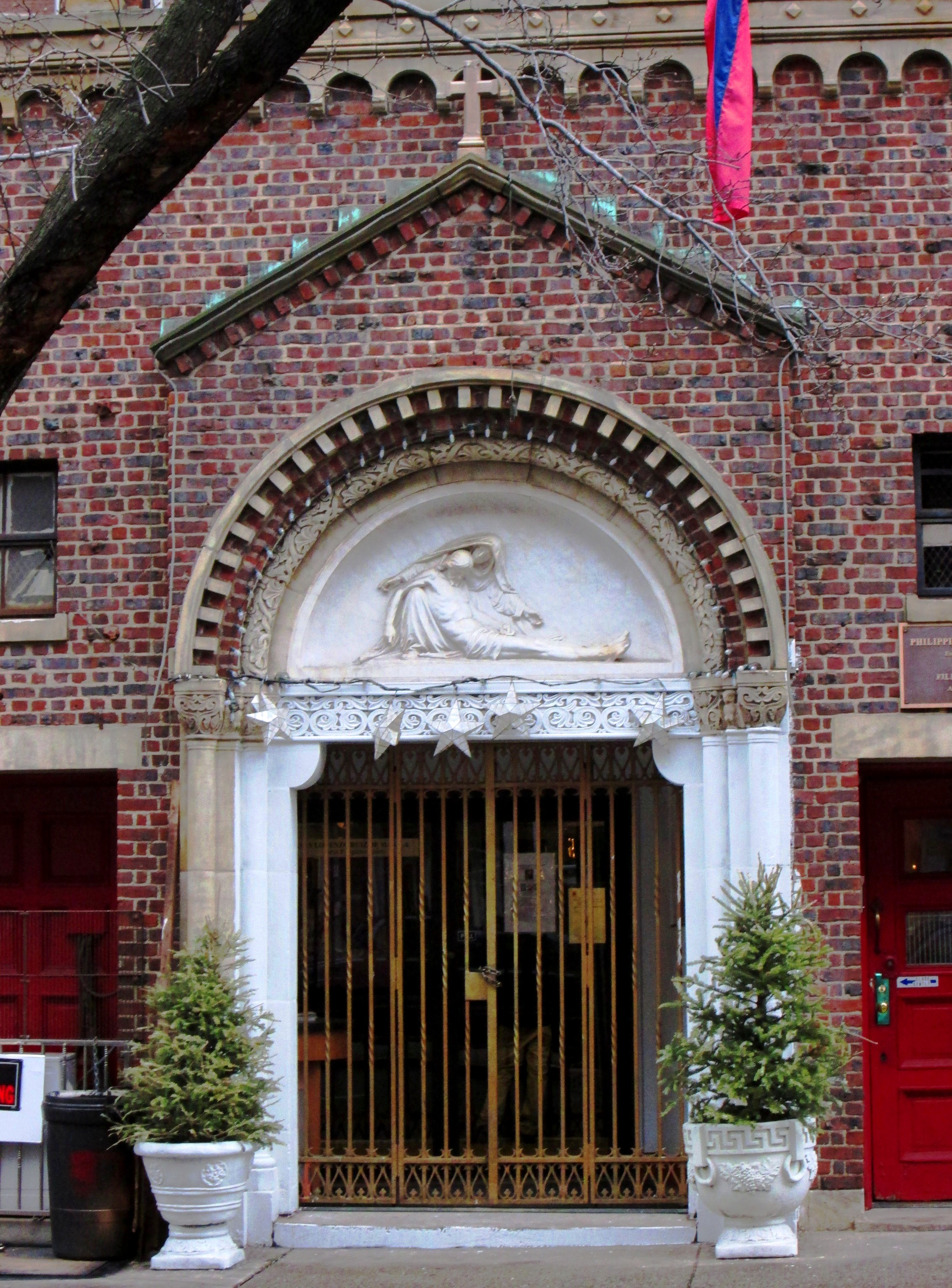
Entrance (2013)

The Chapel of San Lorenzo Ruiz was a Catholic church in the Archdiocese of New York, located at 378 Broome Street between Mulberry and Mott Streets in the Nolita neighborhood of Manhattan in New York City. The chapel was established in 2005. The building was originally constructed for the Church of the Most Holy Crucifix in 1925–26, and was designed by Robert J. Reiley.

The chapel was designated for the Filipino Apostolate of the archdiocese. It was named as the official "Church of Filipinos" by Cardinal Edward Egan on June 15, 2005. Demographic shifts led to the church being closed and sold in 2017.

== Building ==
The Church of the Most Holy Crucifix parish was established in 1925 for the mostly Italian community. It closed in 2005, when the building became the Chapel of San Lorenzo Ruiz. The sanctuary, along with a three-story rectory, was designed by Robert J. Reiley and was built in 1925–26 at the cost of $40,000. It has a capacity of 250 persons. The building has three floors which house the "Cardinal Sin Memorial Hall", offices and living quarters for the archdiocese coordinator.

== History ==
In 1982, a bronze statue of the first Filipino saint, San Lorenzo Ruiz, was donated by Philippine Cardinal Jaime Sin to Filipinos in the United States. It was brought to the U.S. by Celso Al Carunungan, author of To Die A Thousand Deaths, a book on the life and martyrdom of Ruiz, accompanied by Ramon Salinas, the national director of the Movement for the Cause of San Lorenzo Ruiz and Companion Martyrs. Carunungan and Salinas, together with Filipino youth leaders Antonio Santiago and Paul John Durano Gorre, were delegated by Cardinal Sin to establish a movement for San Lorenzo Ruiz in the United States.

The statue of San Lorenzo Ruiz was displayed every September at Saint Patrick's Cathedral during the mass for the saint's feast day. It was originally displayed at the Holy Family Church at the United Nations until it was transferred to the Philippine Pastoral Center in 1998.

=== Filipino Apostolate ===
The Filipino Apostolate was established by Cardinal Archbishop John O'Connor on April 11, 1995, to address the pastoral needs of Filipino Catholics in New York. It is in charge of the Chapel of San Lorenzo Ruiz and the Philippine Pastoral Center. Erno Diaz was appointed as the first archdiocesan coordinator and director of the Filipino Apostolate. Jose Marabe is the present director of San Lorenzo Ruiz Chapel.

In 1998, a building was leased to the Filipino Apostolate at 248 East 62nd Street in Manhattan. The building was officially named as the Philippine Pastoral Center and became a venue for priests and cultural groups in New York, giving lectures, celebrating masses and performing cultural and religious activities.

=== Chapel ===
The Chapel of San Lorenzo Ruiz officially opened on September 1, 2005. The opening was followed by an inaugural mass celebrated by O'Connor on September 15, 2005. It is the third Catholic church officially dedicated to Filipinos outside the Philippines. The first one - St. Columban Filipino Catholic Church (1944) - is in Historic Filipinotown in Los Angeles, and the second one - The Basilica of Sta. Pudenciana (1991) - is in Rome.

On September 15, 2005, the bronze statue of San Lorenzo Ruiz was enshrined and unveiled in the chapel. Philippine President Gloria Macapagal Arroyo was the guest of honor. Weekly masses and novenas are held in the chapel to honor the first Filipino saint and martyr. The statue is considered miraculous by devotees.

Although not an official parish church, Egan has authorized the Chapel of San Lorenzo Ruiz to offer weekday and weekend masses and all of the sacraments of the church, with the exception of the Sacrament of Confirmation, as only a bishop can confer the Sacrament of Confirmation. Sunday Masses, Filipino-style weddings, baptisms, and funerals are held in the chapel. Although it has been designated as a church for the Filipino community and was authorized to perform Filipino liturgies, it welcomes all peoples regardless of ethnicity and background to attend its services and to participate in the events held in it and the Philippine Pastoral Center.

The Filipino Apostolate's aim is to elevate the designation of the Chapel of San Lorenzo Ruiz into a parish church status. Factors that will help the Filipino Apostolate in achieving this goal is by maintaining good record-keeping, financial management and pastoral programs.

=== 20th anniversary ===
On September 29, 2007, the Roman Catholic Church celebrated the 20th anniversary of Lorenzo Ruiz's canonization in 1987. Manila's then Archbishop, Cardinal Gaudencio Rosales, said:

Kahit saan nandoon ang mga Pilipino, ang katapatan sa Diyos ay dala-dala ng Pinoy. ("Wherever Filipinos may go, they carry their faith in God.")

=== Sale ===
By 2006, as few as five people showed up for services, possibly "due to the neighborhood's sparse Filipino population". On July 11, 2017, it was announced that the archdiocese sold the church for $7.3 million.

== See also ==
- Filipinos in the New York metropolitan area
- Philippine Center, New York
- Jeronima de la Asuncion
- Martha de San Bernardo -First Filipino Nun
- Mother Ignacia del Espiritu Santo
- Religious of the Virgin Mary
- Three Fertility Saints of Obando, Bulacan, Philippines
