= Filipinos in the New York metropolitan area =

Mga Pilipino sa Kalakhang New York (Filipino)
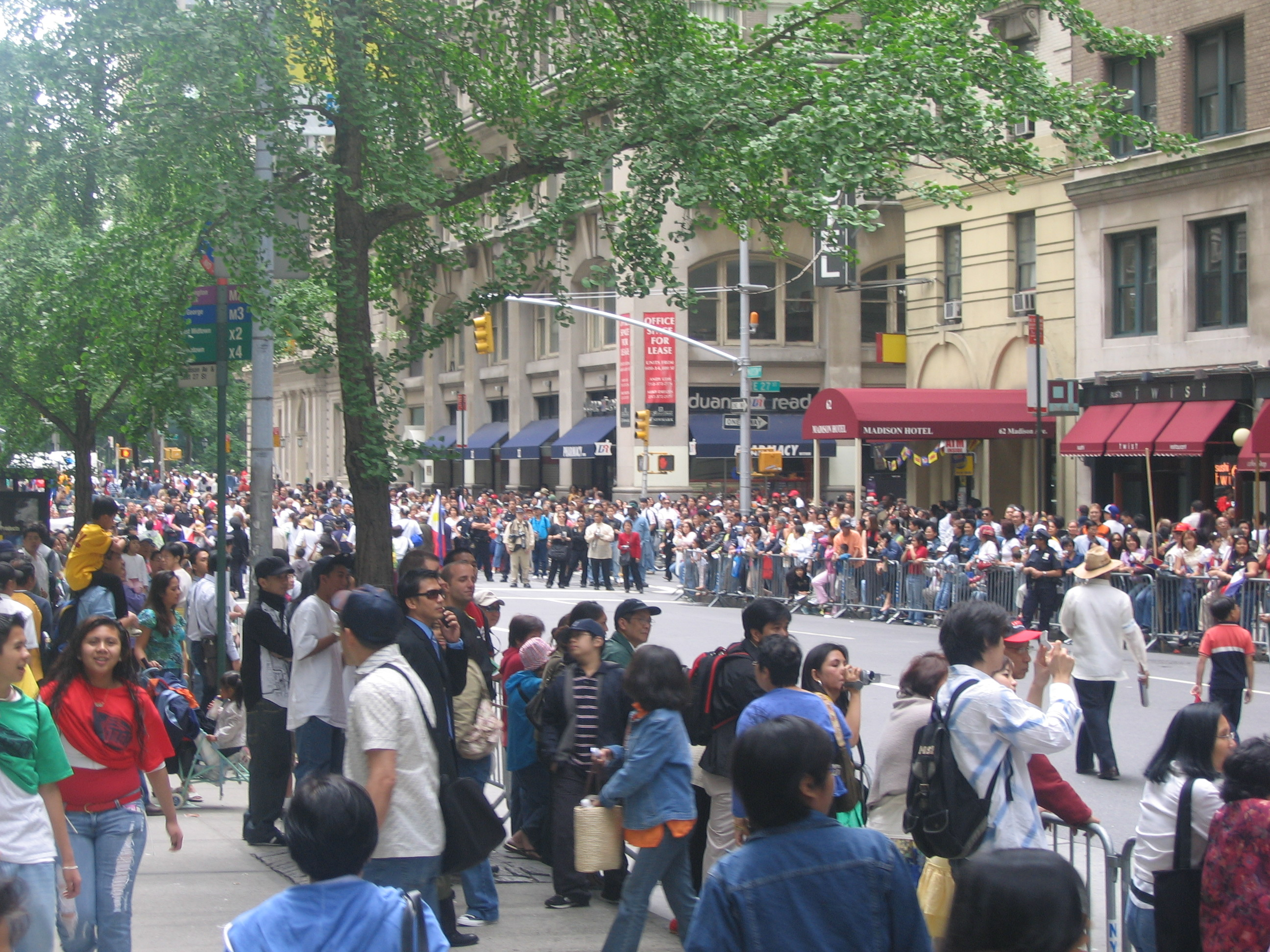
- From Manila to Manhattan: spectators at the annual Philippine Independence Day Parade on Madison Avenue in Manhattan, the world’s largest outside the Philippine capital

Languages
- English (Philippine English), Tagalog, Philippine Spanish, Ilocano, Kapampangan, Pangasinan, Philippine Chinese (Hokkien), Chavacano, Visayan languages, and other languages of the Philippines

Religion
- Catholicism, Protestantism, Buddhism, irreligion, others

Related ethnic groups
- Filipino American

In the New York metropolitan area, Filipinos constitute one of the largest diasporas in the Western Hemisphere. By 2014 Census estimates, the New York City-Northern New Jersey-Long Island, NY-NJ-CT-PA Combined Statistical Area was home to 262,375 Filipino Americans, 221,612 (84.5%) of them uniracial Filipinos.

== History ==
New York City has a shorter settlement history compared to historically more common locations for Filipinos to immigrate to, such as the West Coast.

=== Early demographics ===
While larger populations of Filipinos immigrated to New York City after 1965, Filipinos began arriving in New York in the early 1900s. Many came to study as pensionados (or sponsored students) in universities like Columbia University and New York University. Like other immigrants at the time, these Filipinos entered through Ellis Island; Manuel Quezon and Carlos Romulo are among those who arrived in this way. In 1911, some Filipinos worked at the Dreamland Amusement Park in Coney Island, simulating what life was like in the Philippines. Most other Filipinos in New York at this time were seamen who docked at the Brooklyn Navy Yard. A Filipino restaurant called Manila Restaurant opened in the late 1920s and was located at 47 Sand Street in Brooklyn.

In 1927, one of the first Filipino civic organizations in New York City, the Filipino Women's Club, was founded. In 1960, there were only 2,744 Filipino Americans in New York City. In 1970, there were 14,279 Filipinos in New York State, 52.4% of whom were college graduates. While Filipinos on the West Coast enjoyed relative proximity to their homeland which was accessible by marine and air, those who settled in the New York City metropolitan area were at a disadvantage. In the 1990s, Philippine Airlines, which had flown into Newark Liberty International Airport, discontinued this service due to financial difficulties. However, the Filipino American community ultimately overcame this obstacle, with many members working in nursing and healthcare before branching out to other professional fields.

In the East Village and the Lower East Side, Manhattan, there was significant Filipino migration in the late 1980s due to mass recruitment of Filipino medical professionals to area hospitals, notably New York Eye and Ear Infirmary, Beth Israel Medical Center, and the former Saint Vincent's Catholic Medical Center. Migration was spurred by the hospitals' offer of subsidized housing to employees, in the midst of ongoing rent strikes in the neighborhood. The burgeoning Little Manila centered on 1st Avenue and 14th Street, around which there were, at the peak, a number of grocery and video-rental stores and Filipino restaurants within a few blocks of one another. Filipino American community relations were strengthened by local Roman Catholic churches in the East Village and Gramercy Park areas. As rents increased, and properties were taken over by New York University, the number of Filipinos and Filipino businesses in the East Village's Little Manila waned. Elvie's Turo-Turo, the longest standing Filipino business in the area, closed in late 2009 after almost 20 years of operation. New Filipino businesses continue to sprout up.

=== Modern demographics ===
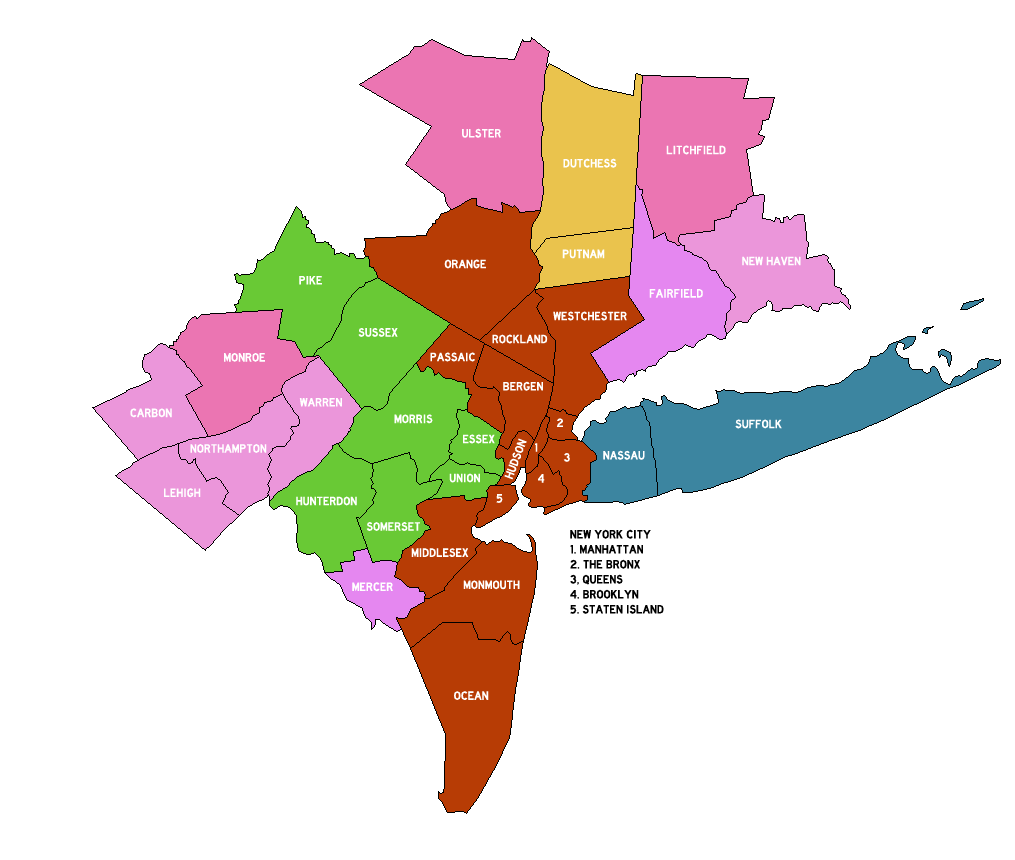
All except the pink/lavender-illustrated counties compose the New York–Northern New Jersey–Long Island NY–NJ–PA Metropolitan Statistical Area, the most populous in the US: New York–Jersey City–White Plains, NY–NJ Metropolitan Division Dutchess County–Putnam County, NY Metropolitan Division Nassau County–Suffolk County, NY Metropolitan Division Newark, NJ–PA Metropolitan Division Remainder of the New York-Newark, NY–NJ–CT–PA Combined Statistical Area

In the 1970s and 1980s, Filipinos in the New Jersey and New York metropolitan region had a higher socioeconomic status than Filipinos elsewhere, as more than half of Filipino immigrants to the metropolitan area were healthcare professionals or other highly trained professionals, in contrast to established working-class Filipino American populations elsewhere. In 1990, there were 43,229 Filipinos in New York City, with the number increasing to around 50,000 in 2000. The borough of Queens is home to the largest concentration of Filipinos within New York City, with about 38,000 Filipinos per the 2010 Census. In 2011, New York City was home to an estimated 82,313 Filipinos, representing a 7.7% increase from the estimated 77,191 in 2008, with 56%, or about 46,000, living in Queens. The Filipino median household income in New York City was $81,929 in 2013, and 68% held a bachelor's degree or higher. Filipinos in New York City were more educated than the total population and Non-Hispanic Whites, but lower income then Non-Hispanic Whites, this is seen as they had a per Capita Income of $56,873 which was significantly lower than $81,361 for the White population. Both Filipino men and women had higher earnings than the total population but significantly lower earnings than Whites. In 2023, Filipinos in New Jersey had lower earnings than South and East Asian groups and well as Non-Hispanic Whites. It should also be noted that in New York City, Filipinos had lower earnings than Non-Hispanic Whites.

In 2008, the New York metropolitan area was home to 215,000 Filipinos. By the 2010 Census, within the New York-Northern New Jersey-Long Island, NY-NJ-PA MSA, there were 217,349 Filipino Americans, with an additional 15,631 in the greater New York-Newark-Bridgeport, NY-NJ-CT-PA CSA. As of 2011, over 150,000 Filipino-born immigrants resided in the New York City metropolitan region.

In 2013, 4,098 Filipinos legally immigrated to the New York-Northern New Jersey-Long Island, NY-NJ-PA core based statistical area; in 2012, this number was 4,879; 4,177 in 2011; 4,047 in 2010, 4,400 in 2009, and 5,985 in 2005. These numerical values do not include the remainder of the New York-Newark-Bridgeport, NY-NJ-CT-PA Combined Statistical Area. Philippine Airlines has resumed service to the New York City region since March 2015, with direct, one-seat service to Manila, this time utilizing JFK International Airport as its gateway. In April 2018, Philippine Airlines launched non-stop flight service between JFK international Airport and Manila, and has operated this important flight connection between Manila and New York continuously since then, even through the worldwide COVID-19 pandemic.

== List of Little Manilas ==
Little Manilas have emerged in the New York City metropolitan area, located in Woodside, Queens; Jersey City, New Jersey; and Bergenfield, New Jersey; in addition to smaller Filipino American subenclaves developing throughout the metropolitan region.

=== Woodside, Queens ===
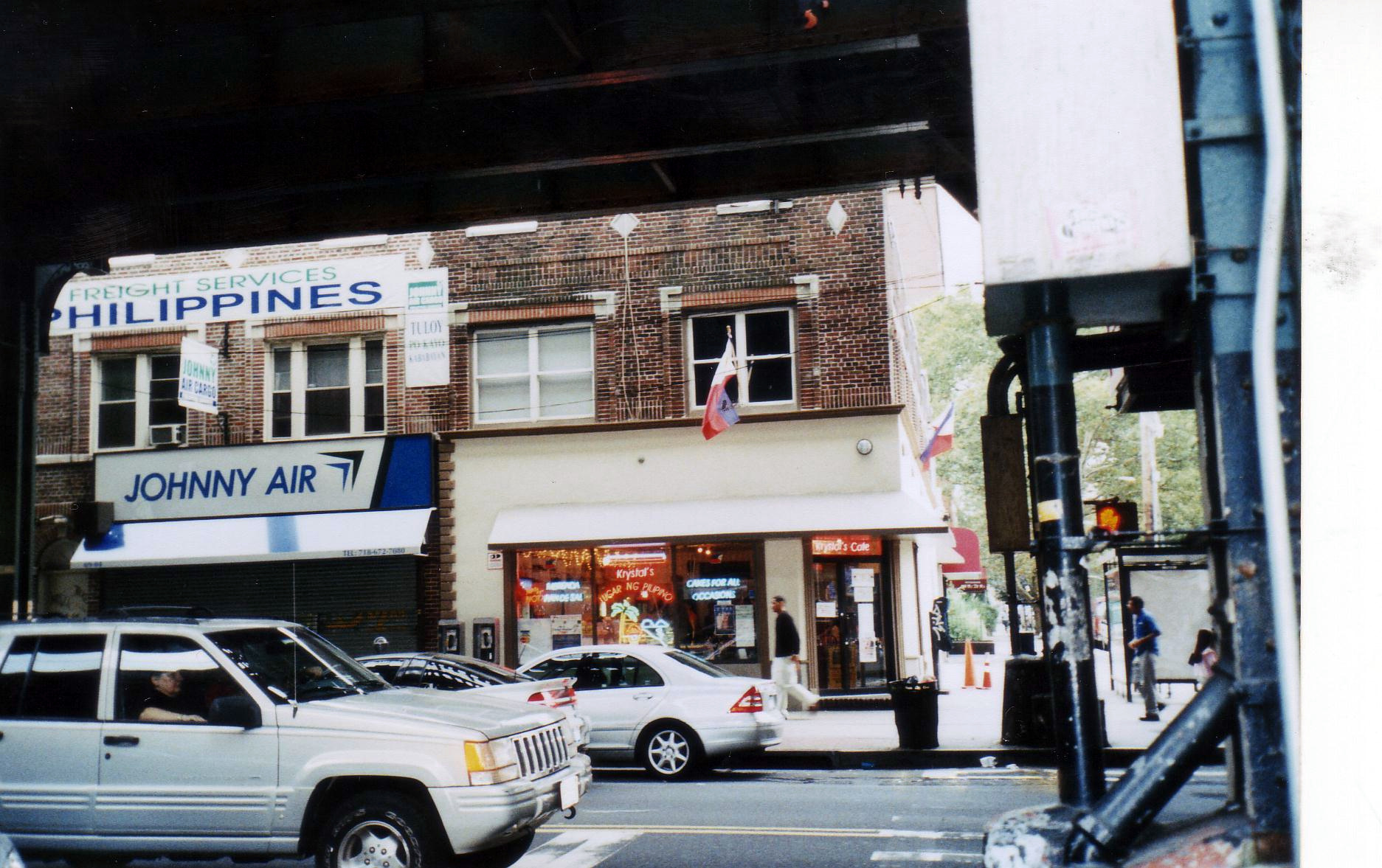
Krystal's Cafe and Johnny Air Cargo shops on Roosevelt Avenue, Woodside, Queens, New York City.

Woodside, Queens, known as Filipinotown, is commonly known for its concentration of Filipinos.

Filipino cafés and restaurants dominate the area, as well as several freight delivery and remittance centers scattered throughout the neighborhood. Other Filipino-owned businesses including professional services (medical, dental, optical), driving schools, beauty salons, immigration services, and Filipino video rental establishments are present in the community.

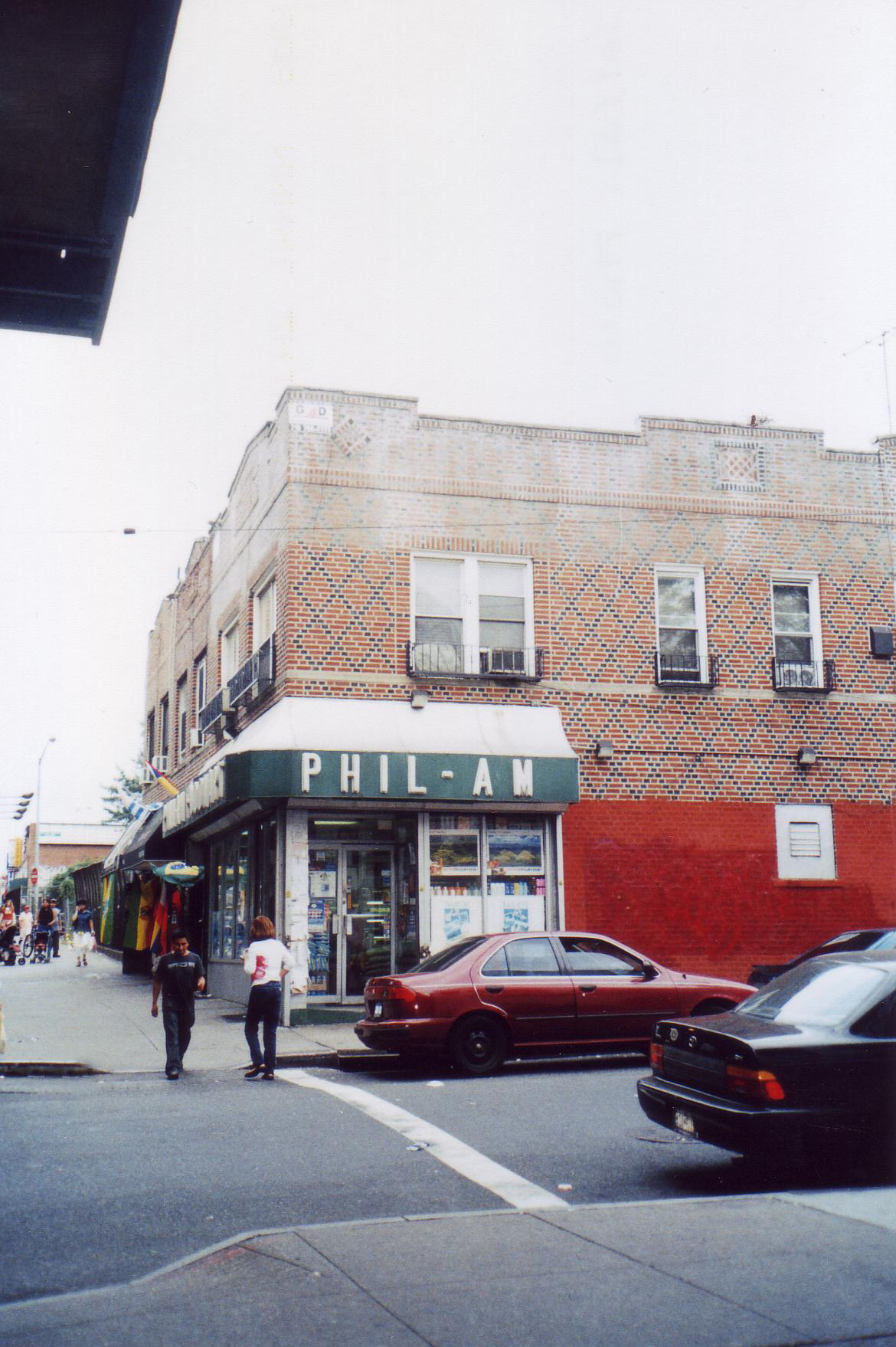
The Phil-Am grocery store in Woodside.

Woodside has many types of transportation used on a daily basis. The IRT Flushing Line (7 train), known colloquially as the Orient Express, the 69th Street station serves as the gateway to Queens' largest Little Manila, along with other public transportation such as the Long Island Railroad and buses. The coverage of Little Manila is along Roosevelt Avenue, between 58th and 74th Streets. Elsewhere in Queens, Filipinos are also concentrated in Jackson Heights and Elmhurst. There are also smaller Filipino communities in Jamaica, Queens and parts of Brooklyn. The Benigno Aquino Triangle is located on Hillside Avenue in Hollis, Queens to commemorate the slain Filipino political leader and to recognize the large Filipino American population in the area.

In February 2008, the Bayanihan Filipino Community Center opened its doors in Woodside, a project spearheaded by the Philippine Forum. The Philippine Forum also hosts the annual Bayanihan Cultural Festival at the Hart Playground in September to commemorate Filipino American History Month.

On June 12, 2022, a sign-unveiling ceremony and celebration were held at the intersection of 70th Street and Roosevelt Avenue to commemorate the Filipino community’s growing presence and contributions in Queens. Concomitantly, there is also a Roosevelt Avenue in Quezon City, Philippines. The corner in Queens was co-named "Little Manila Avenue”.

=== Manhattan ===
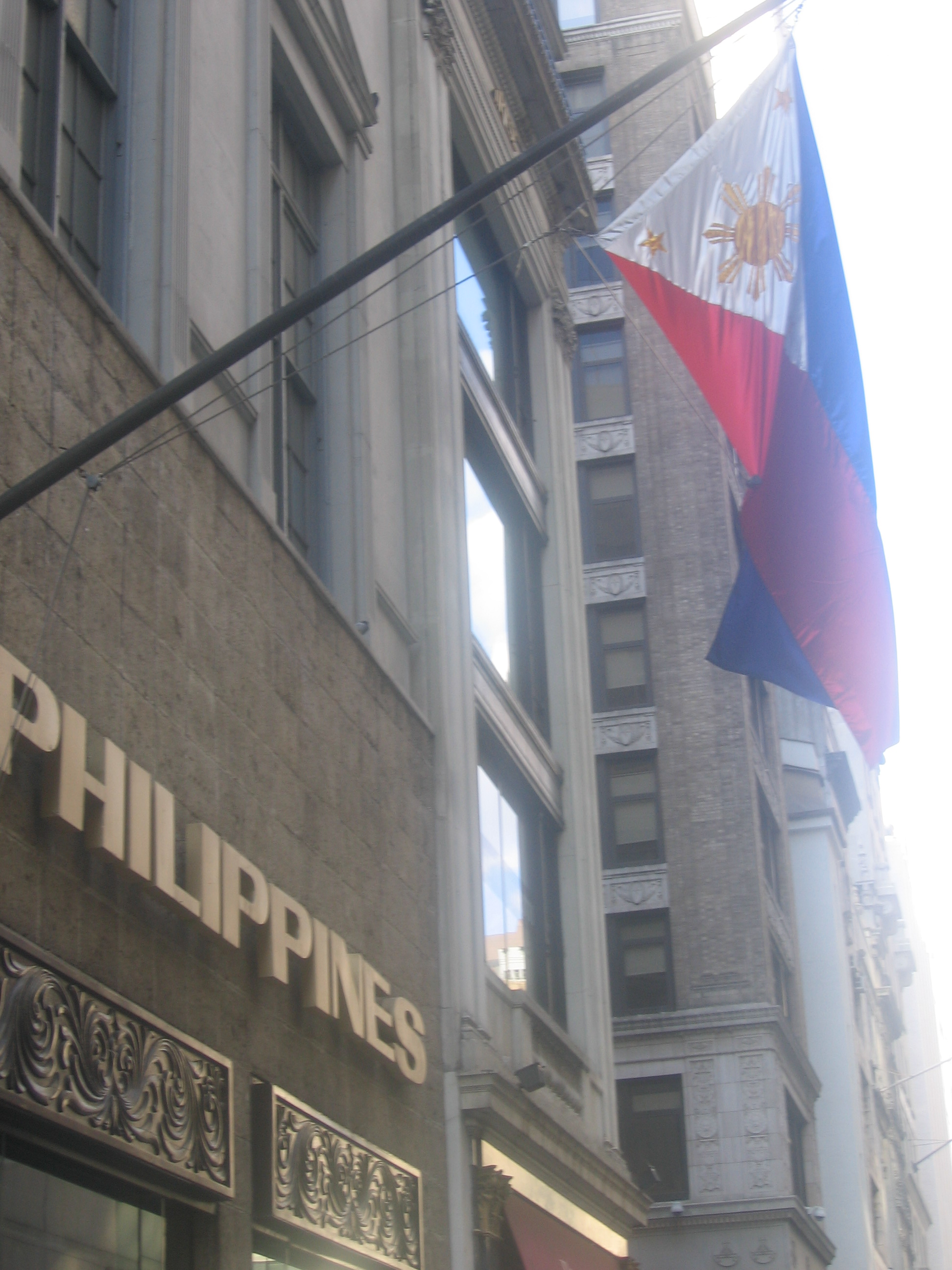
Philippine Center in Manhattan.

The Philippine Consulate of New York has a multipurpose role – aside from its governmental duties and functions, it also caters to many events of the Filipino American community and even has a school called Paaralan sa Konsulado (School at the consulate), which teaches newer-generation Filipino Americans about their culture and language. The consulate is known as the Philippine Center. The Philippine Center's large edifice is situated on Fifth Avenue in Manhattan and is open to the public on business days and closed on Philippine and American holidays. The building itself is considered as the largest foreign consulate on the strip of the avenue. The Archdiocese of New York designated a chapel named after the first Filipino Saint Lorenzo Ruiz de Manila for the Filipino Apostolate. Officially designated as the "Church of Filipinos," the Chapel of San Lorenzo Ruiz in Lower Manhattan is only the third in the world and the first in the United States dedicated as such.

=== Eastern Long Island ===
Long Island has seen a recent growth of Filipino Americans, following the overall eastward expansion of Asians from Queens into Nassau and Suffolk counties.

=== Northern and Central New Jersey ===
A Philippine grocery store in Jersey City.

Northern and Central New Jersey are home to significant overseas Filipino populations, numbering more than 100,000 statewide, according to the 2010 U.S. Census. While Filipinos can be found across the state, the commercial districts catering to the Filipino community are found mostly in the state's urban areas. State and local governments in the Garden State have a significant number of employees of Filipino background, and they play a vital role in the state's affairs, issues, commerce, and health care. Filipino enclaves exist in Jersey City, Bergenfield, Paterson, Passaic, Union City, Elizabeth, and most recently, Edison. The Meadowlands Exposition Center in Secaucus hosts the annual Philippine Fiesta, a cultural festival that draws Filipinos and non-Filipinos alike from across the New York metropolitan area. The event takes place on the weekend of the second week of August. As of 2021, Jollibee, the restaurant conglomerate headquartered in Ortigas Center, Pasig, in Metro Manila, had five branch locations in Northern and Central Jersey, including three in Jersey City alone.

Bergen County, Hudson County, Middlesex County, and Passaic County have developed in Northern and Central New Jersey as popular destinations for Filipino Americans. Within Bergen County, Bergenfield, along with Paramus, Hackensack, New Milford, Dumont, Fair Lawn, and Teaneck, have developed growing Filipino populations. Taken as a whole, these municipalities are home to a significant proportion of Bergen County's Philippine population. A census-estimated 20,859 Filipino Americans resided in Bergen County as of 2013, embodying an increase from the 19,155 counted in 2010. The Philippine-American Community of Bergen County (PACBC) organization is based in Paramus, while other Filipino organizations are based in Fair Lawn and Bergenfield. Bergen County's vibrant and culturally active Filipino community repatriated significant financial assistance to victims of Typhoon Haiyan, which ravaged the Philippines in November 2013. In Hudson County, Jersey City is home to the largest Filipino population in New Jersey, with over 16,000 Filipinos as of 2010. Holy Name Medical Center in Teaneck, Bergen County, launched its Filipino Medical Program in December 2015.

==== Jersey City: Five Corners, Newark Avenue, and Manila Avenue ====
Seven percent (7%) of Jersey City's population is of Filipino descent, part of community who first came to city in the late 1950s. The Five Corners district has a thriving Filipino community that forms one of the largest Asian-American subgroups in the city. Newark Avenue's strip of Filipino culture and commerce is significantly large and growing. A variety of Filipino restaurants, shippers and freighters, doctors' offices, bakeries, stores, and even an office of The Filipino Channel have made Newark Avenue their home in recent decades. The first Filipino-owned grocery store on the East Coast, Phil-Am Food, originated in Jersey City in 1973; while the establishment's name has since been changed to FilStop, the moniker Phil-Am has nonetheless expanded to other businesses in Middlesex County, including in Woodbridge and East Brunswick. An array of Filipino-owned businesses can also be found in Jersey City's West Side section, which is home to many locals of Filipino descent. In 2006, Red Ribbon Bakeshop opened its first branch on the East Coast, with Jersey City being the site of the new pastry shop. Manila Avenue in Downtown Jersey City was named for the Philippine capital city because of the many Filipinos who had built their homes on the street during the 1970s. A memorial dedicated to the Filipino American veterans of the Vietnam War was built in a small square on Manila Avenue. Additionally, a park and statue dedicated to José Rizal, the national hero of the Philippines, exist in downtown Jersey City. Furthermore, Jersey City is the host of the annual Philippine-American Friendship Day Parade, an event that occurs yearly on the last Sunday of June. The City Hall of Jersey City raises the Philippine flag in correlation with this event and as a tribute to the contributions of the local Filipino community. The city's annual Santakrusan procession has taken place since 1977 along Manila Avenue.

In 2011, Rolando Lavarro, Jr. became the first Filipino American in Jersey City to win an elective position as a city council member, and in 2013, Lavarro became the first Filipino American council president of Jersey City. Several other Filipinos have been appointed to various Jersey City municipal posts and commissions.

==== Bergenfield ====
Bergenfield is informally known as the Little Manila of Bergen County with a significant concentration of Filipino residents and businesses. Between 2000 and 2010, the Filipino-American population of Bergenfield grew from 11.7 percent, or 3,081 residents, to 17.1 percent, or 4,569, and increased further to 5,062 (18.4%) by 2016. In 2014, Filipino-born attorney Arvin Amatorio was elected a borough councilman. Amatorio later was elected mayor in 2019, narrowly defeating incumbent Mayor Norman Schmelz. Amatorio was reelected mayor unopposed in 2023. On the other side of Bergen County, the Filipino population of Fair Lawn was estimated to have more than doubled between 2010 and 2017. Also in Bergen County, Jonathan Wong was elected city councilman in Mahwah in November 2014. The annual Filipino American Festival is held in Bergenfield.

==== Edison ====
Edison and the surrounding areas of Middlesex County, New Jersey, have emerged as a growing hub for Filipinos since 1990. A significant number of Filipinos in Middlesex County work in the burgeoning healthcare and other life-science disciplines at Central Jersey's numerous medical and pharmaceutical institutions.

== Culture ==
=== Philippine Independence Day Parade ===
Young Filipino Americans dressed as Katipuneros at the Philippine Independence Day Parade in Midtown Manhattan.

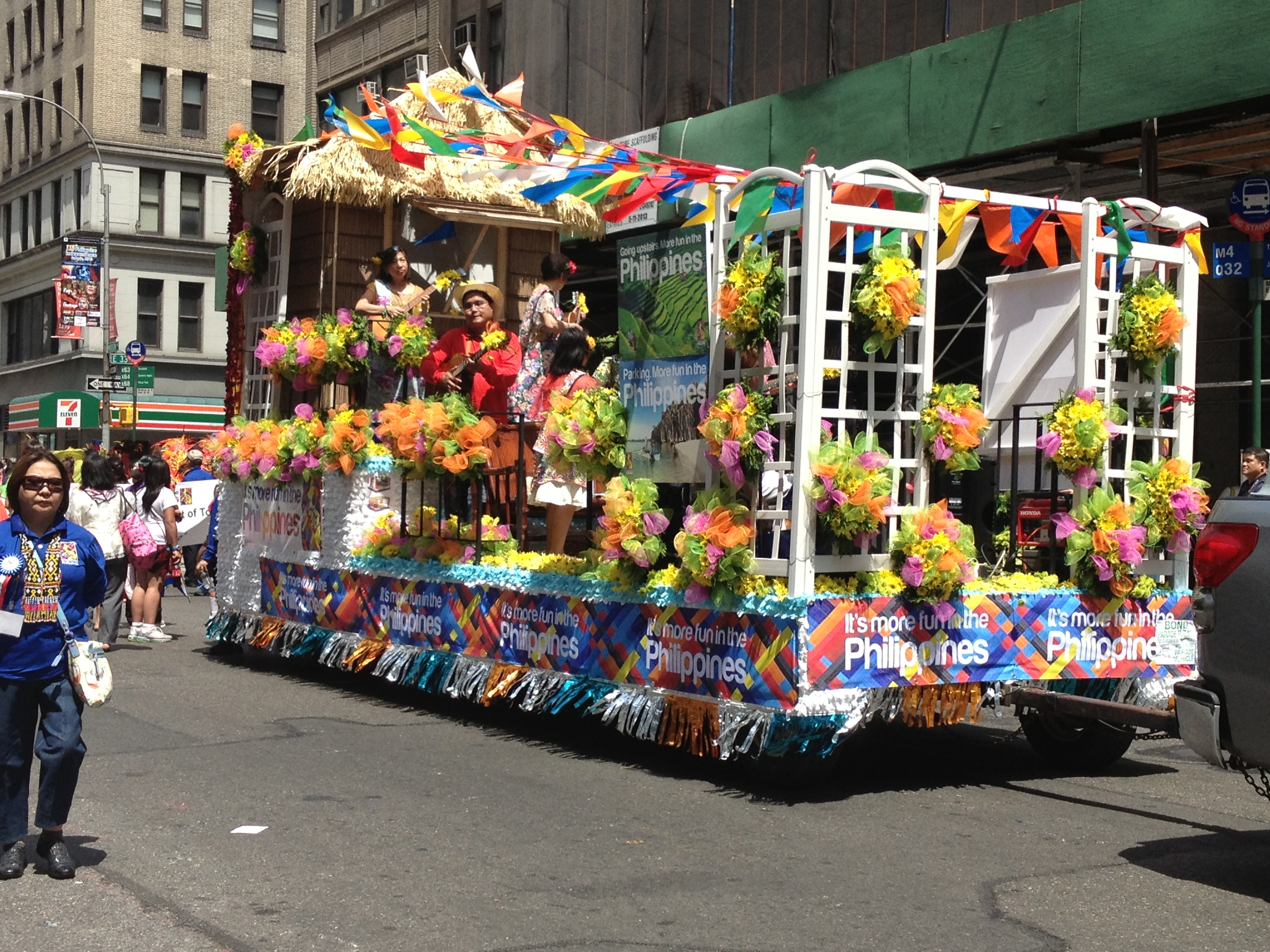
A scene at the Philippine Independence Day Parade in Midtown Manhattan

The annual Philippine Independence Day Parade in New York City, the world’s largest outside Manila, is traditionally held on the first Sunday of June on Madison Avenue in Manhattan. This celebration is a combination of a parade and a street fair. Madison Avenue is replete on this day with Filipino culture, colors, and people and is attended by many significant political figures, entertainers, civic groups, etc. The Philippine Independence Day Parade is increasingly being attended by both American politicians and Filipino celelebrities as well as diplomatic officials who are keenly aware of the significant and increasing political and economic power exerted by the Filipino diaspora in the New York metropolitan area.

A smaller annual Philippine Independence Day parade is held in early June in Passaic, New Jersey.

=== Philippine-American Friendship Day Parade ===
The annual Philippine-American Friendship Day Parade is held in Jersey City every fourth Sunday of June.

=== Arts, entertainment, and media ===
In 2013, so many Filipino films screened across New York City as a part of the New York Asian Film Festival that, according to the Philippine Inquirer, "it could very well have been called the New York Filipino Film Festival".

In 2014, Here Lies Love, a bio-musical play about the personal and political dynamics between former Philippine first couple Ferdinand and Imelda Marcos, opened off-Broadway. The majority of the cast members were of Filipino descent, and the play was set in a discotheque.

=== Filipino cafés and cuisine ===
The growth in the New York City metropolitan region's Filipino populace has been accompanied by growth in the number of Filipino cafés serving Filipino coffee, especially of the leche flan, cassava, and ube varieties; and Filipino restaurants, with the accessibility of Filipino-Chinese specialties such as siopao joining traditional Philippine cuisine, including inihaw na liempo and kare kare, snacks such as pandesal, and desserts including ensaïmada, purple ube cakes, halo-halo, and mango cake rolls. Turo Turo-style buffet dining has become readily available. Beginning in the mid-2010s, Filipino cuisine began to take on a more prominent place in the New York metro as well as Washington metro areas. As of 2022, Kabayan Grill had opened six branches on Long Island, including four in Queens, and its largest Turo Turo-style dining branch in Suffolk County, where a growing Filipino community has been thriving on the county's peninsular geography resembling some parts of the Philippines.

=== Languages ===
Filipinos in New York and New Jersey, as in the United States as a whole, are highly fluent in English. However, in the largest Little Manilas in the area, including Woodside, Jersey City, and Bergenfield, Tagalog signage is commonplace. Spanish is also often learned due to Filipinos' cultural proximity to the local community in New York, as well as being commonly taught as a second language in public schools through the NYC Department of Education's bilingual programs.

== NYC-area Filipinos ==
Filipino New Yorkers (Mga Pilipino sa Kalakhang New York)

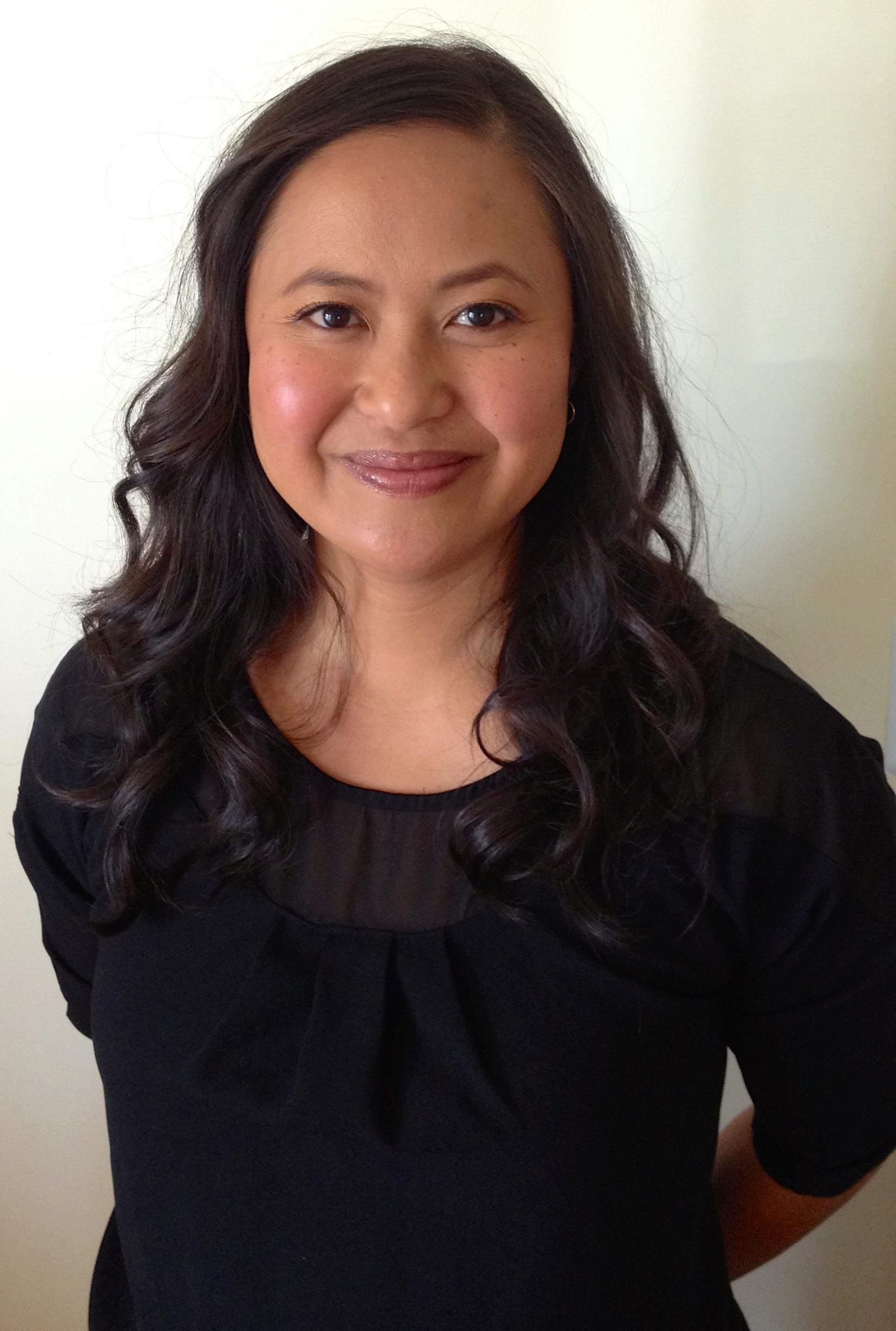
Marissa Aroy

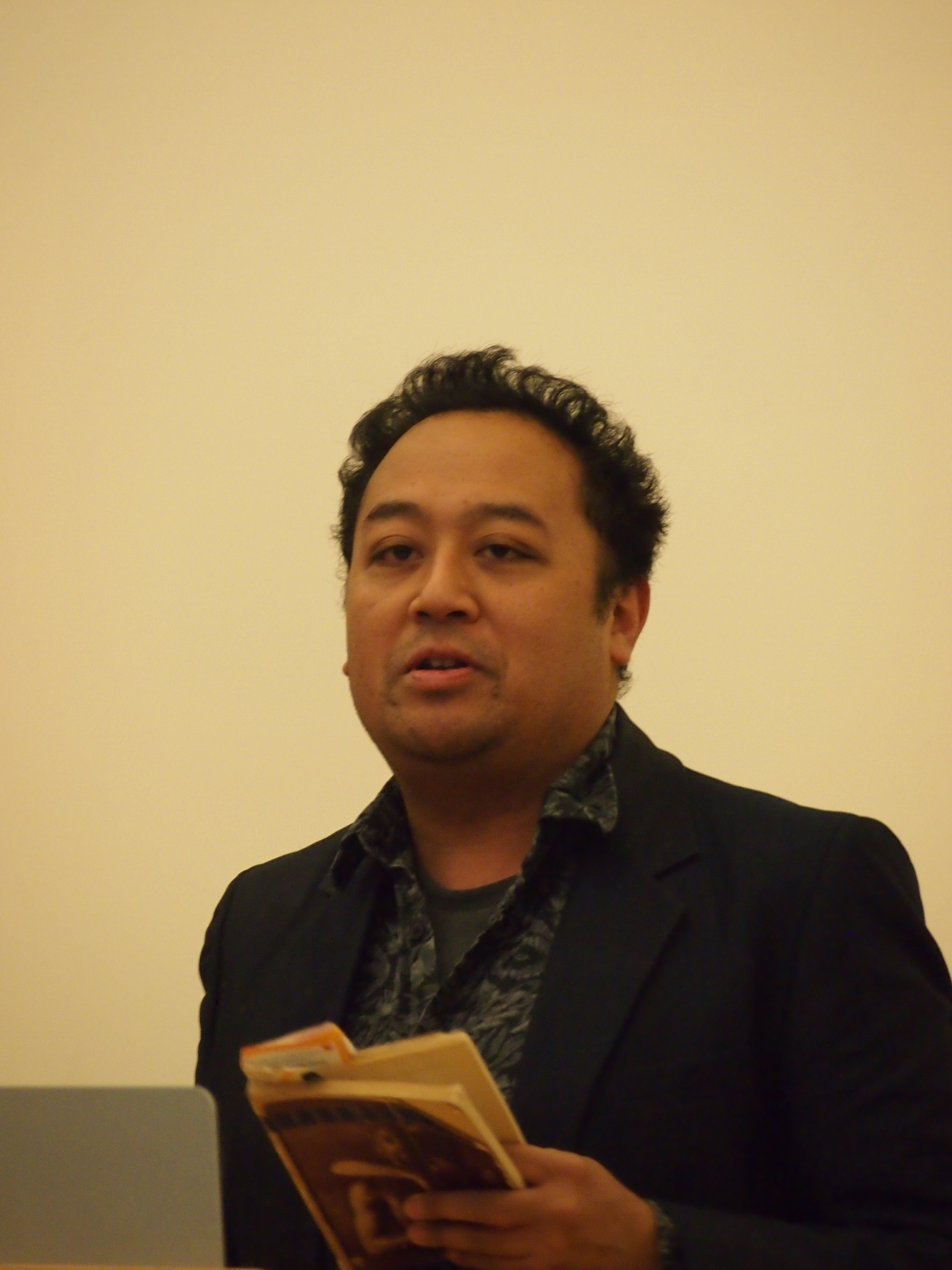
Regie Cabico

Jiggly Caliente

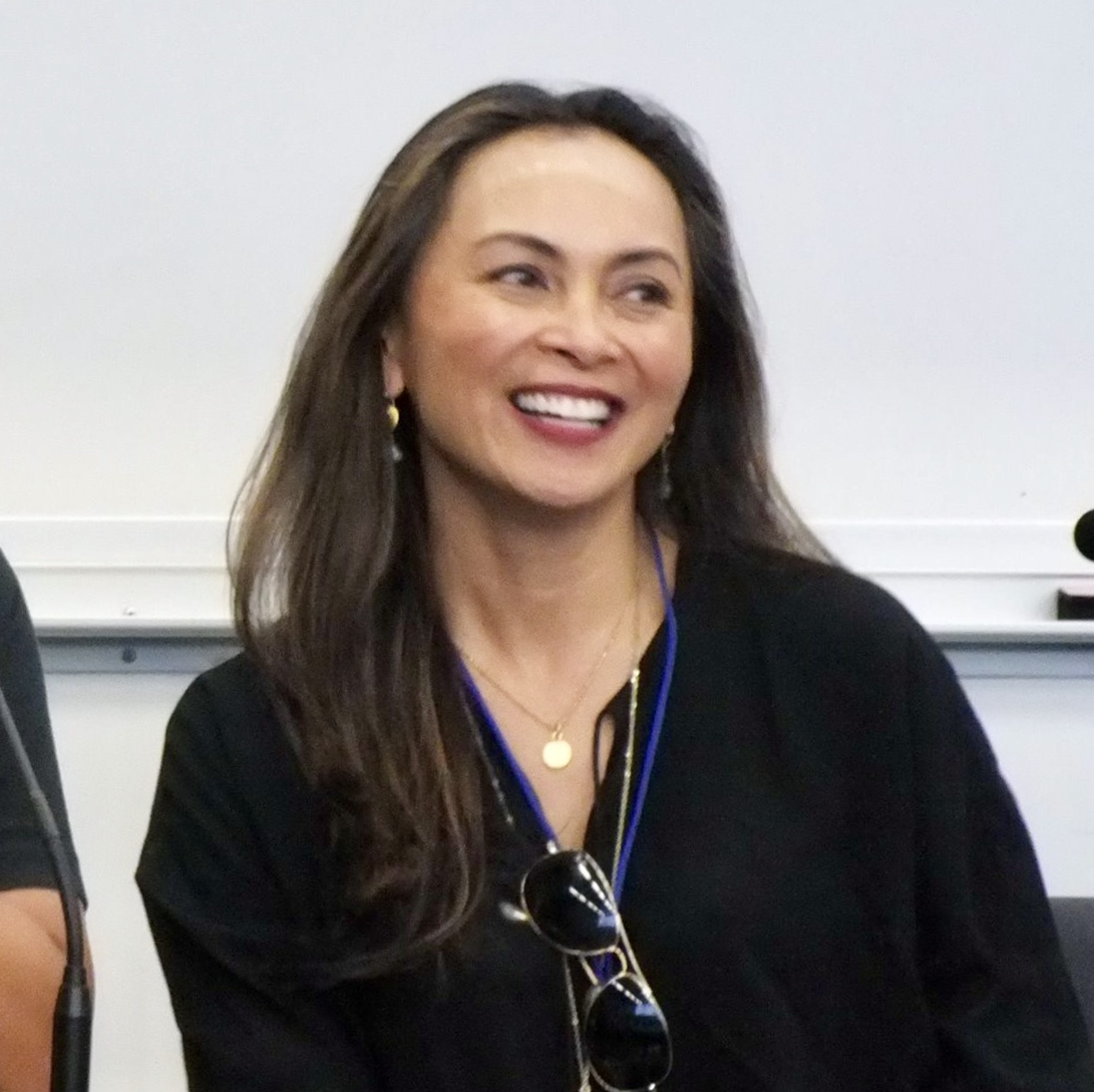
Ernabel Demillo

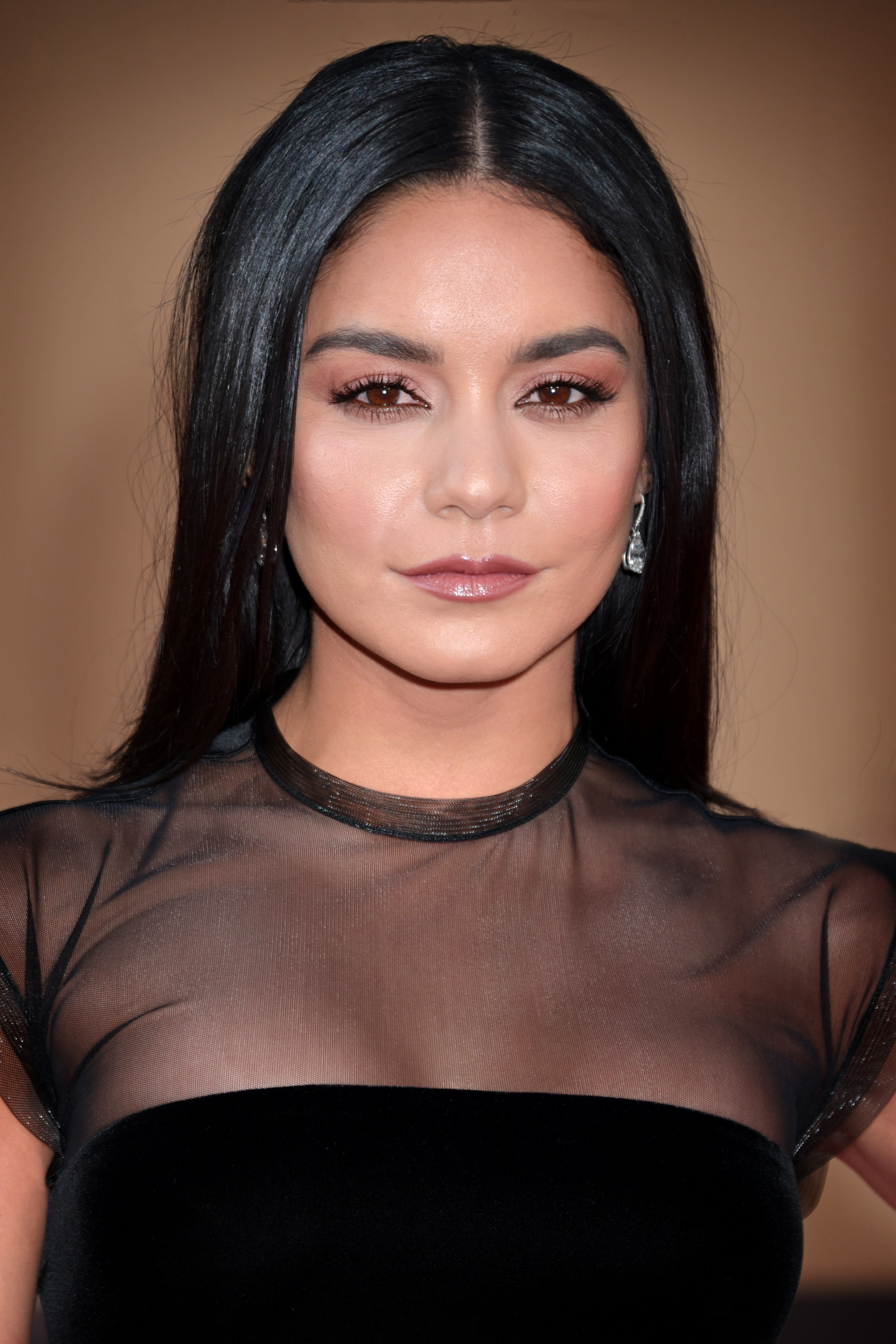
Vanessa Hudgens

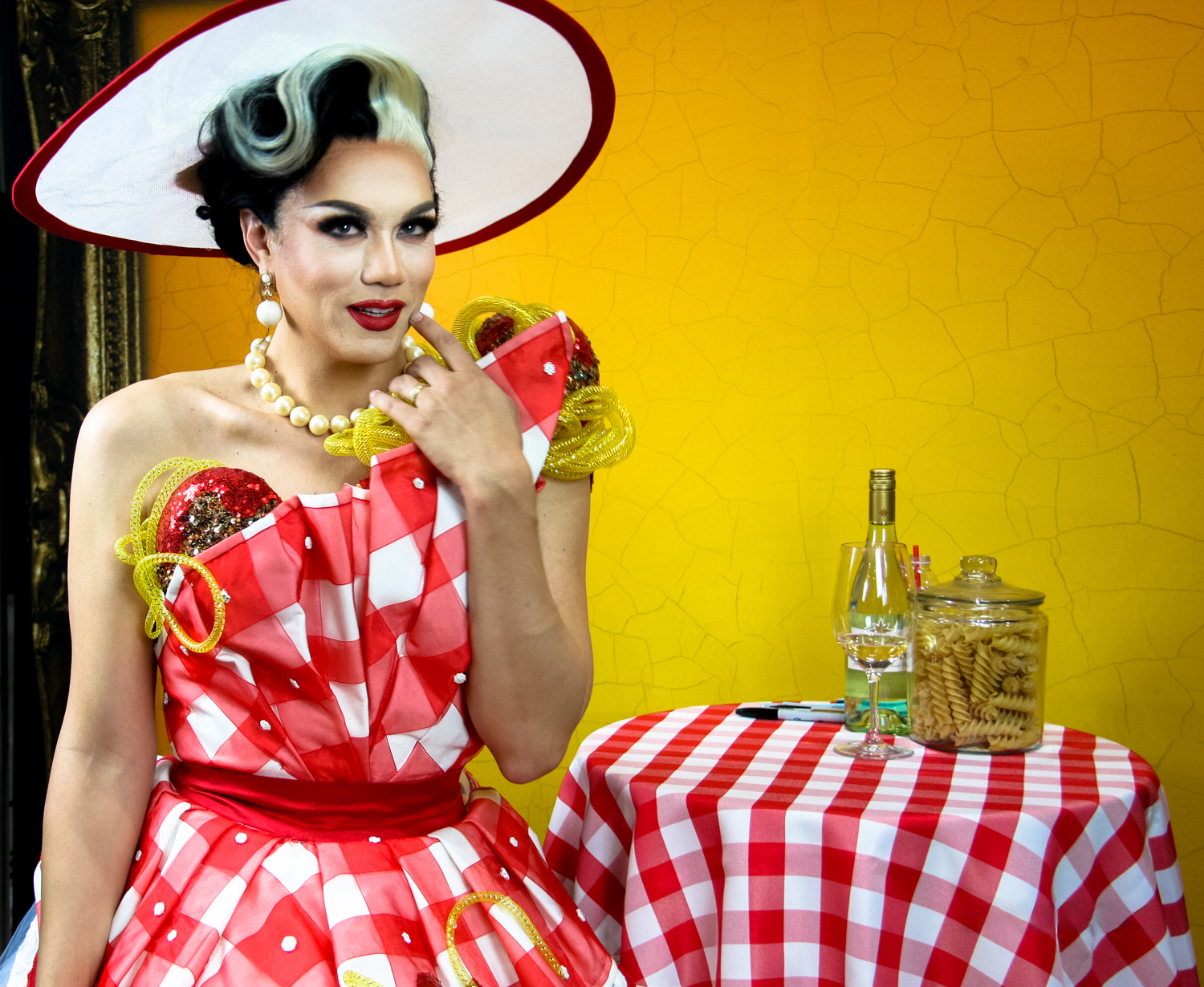
Manila Luzon

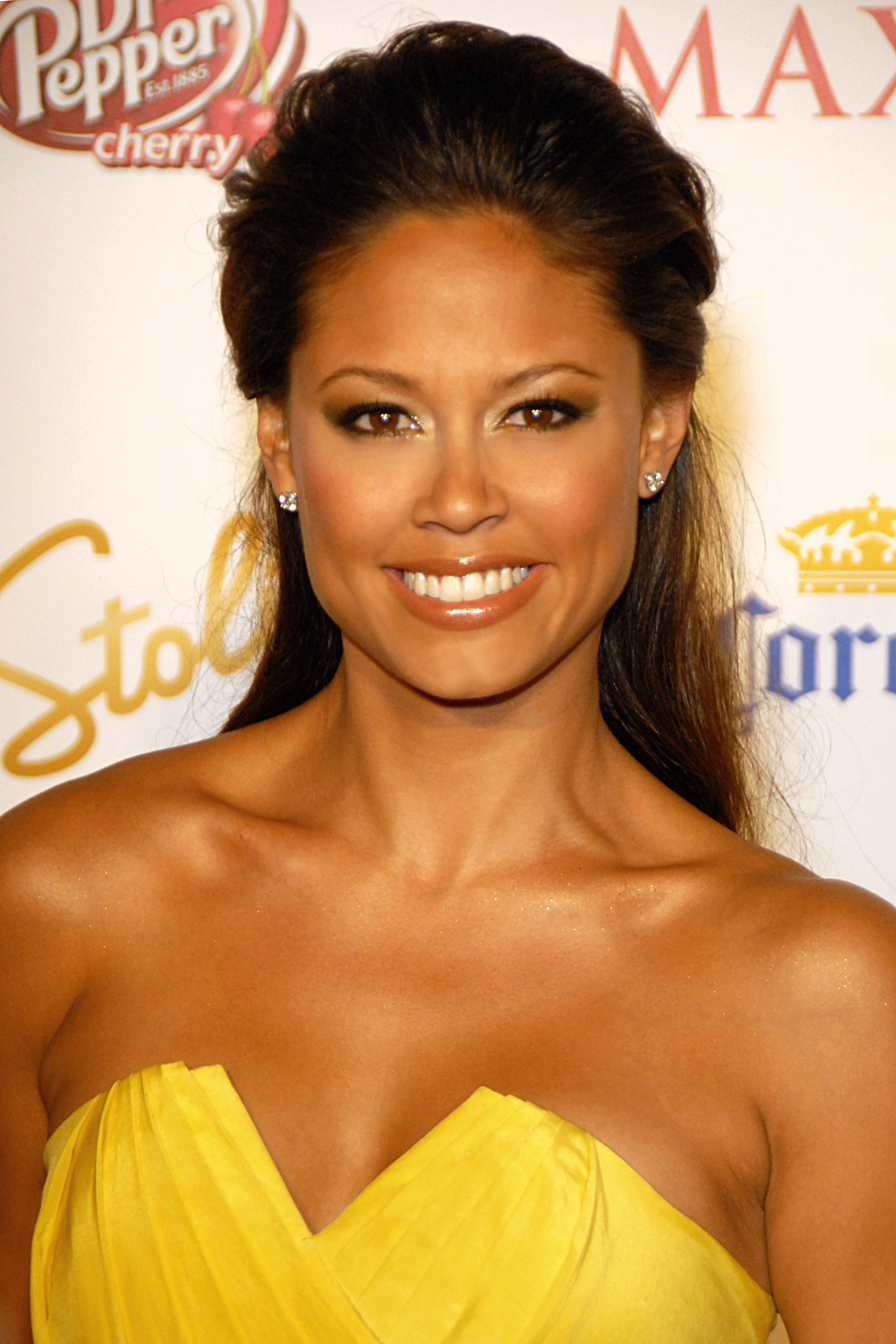
Vanessa Minnillo

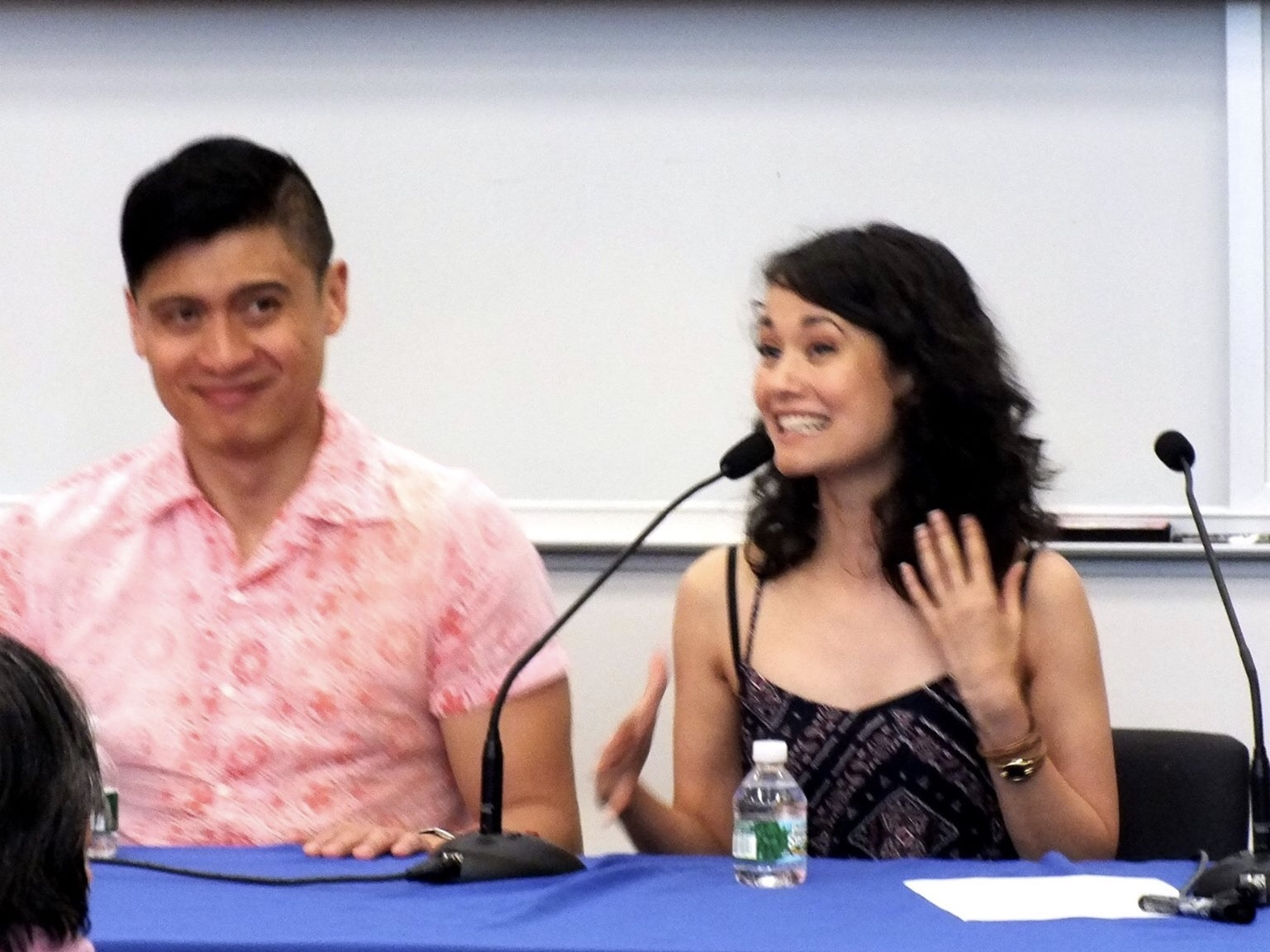
Paolo Montalban and Ali Ewoldt

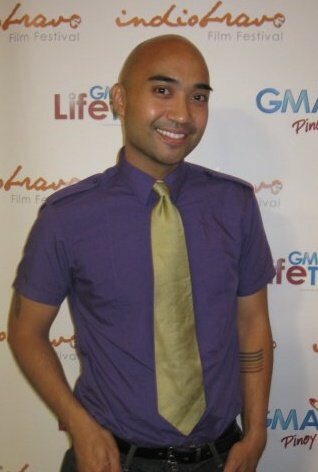
Kevin Nadal

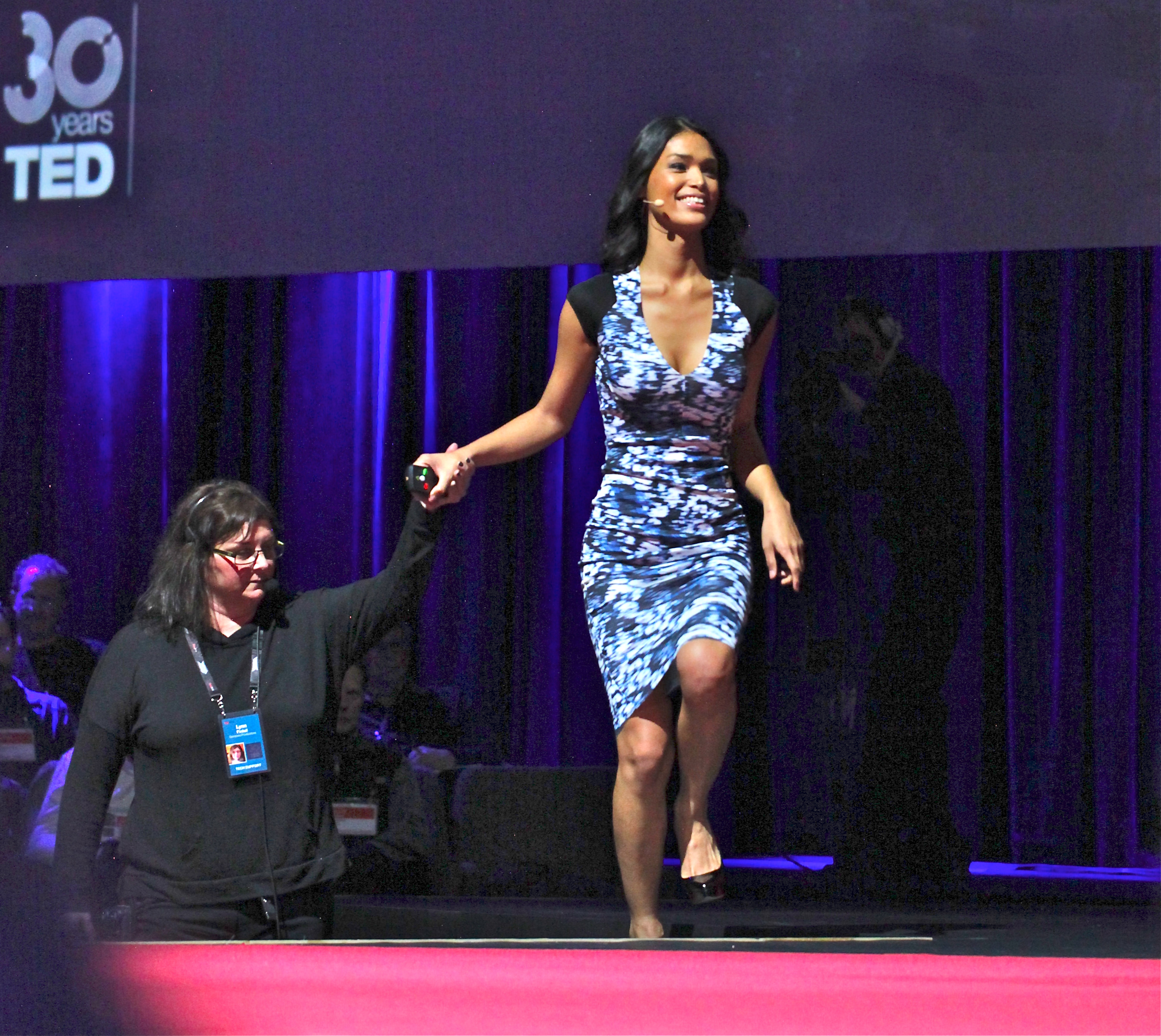
Geena Rocero

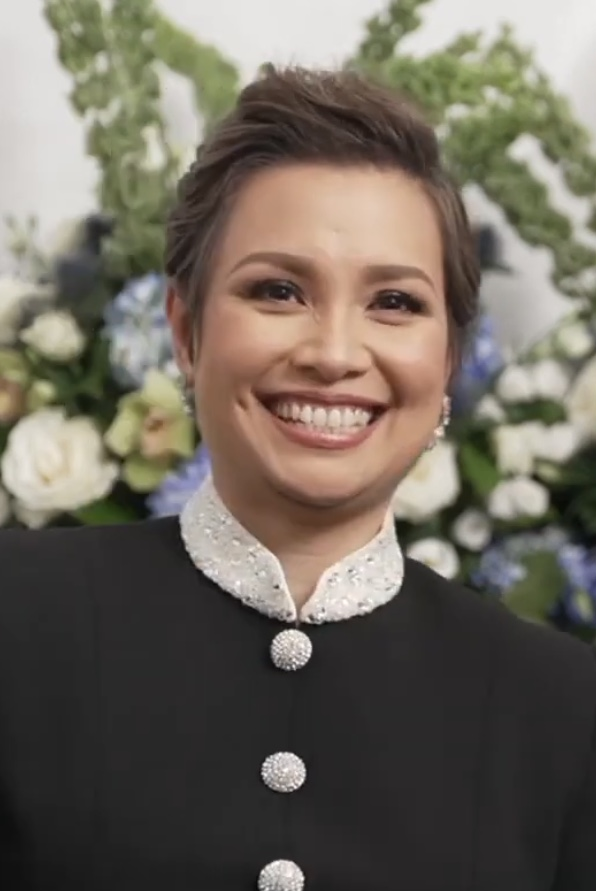
Lea Salonga

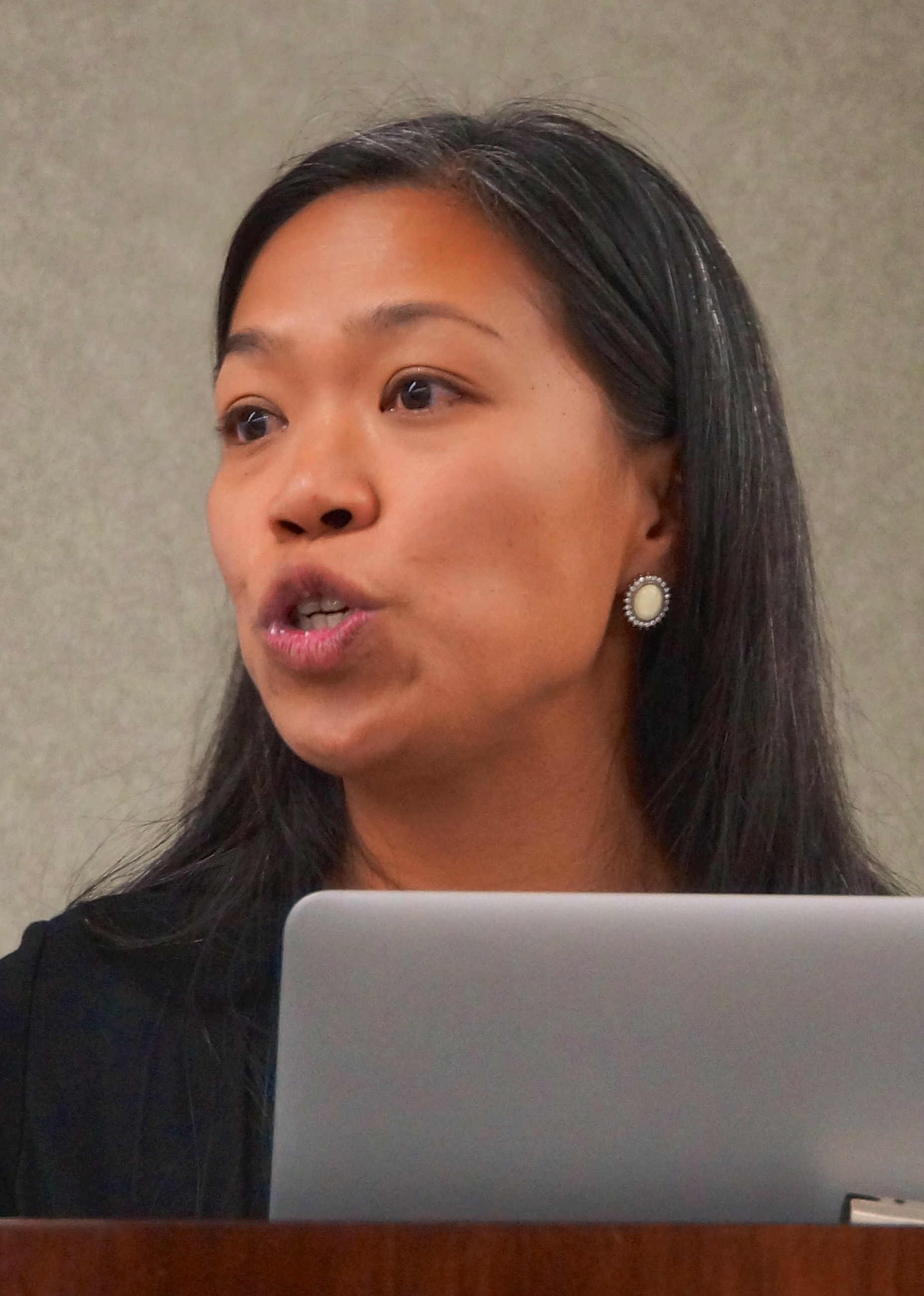
Maria Torres-Springer

=== Education ===
- Tracy Espiritu – District Instructional Coach, Elizabeth Public Schools, Elizabeth, New Jersey, 2014–2015 Milken Educator Award
- Amado Gabriel Esteban – President, Seton Hall University, South Orange, New Jersey, appointed in 2011
- Conrado Gempesaw – President of St. John's University (New York City)
- Kevin Nadal, PhD – Professor of Psychology, John Jay College of Criminal Justice; author, Filipino American Psychology: A Handbook of Theory, Research, and Clinical Practice
- Eleuterio F. Timbol Jr. - Sloan Award for Excellence in Teaching Science and Mathematics 2024, New York City. Empire State Excellence in Teaching Award 2022, New York Co-Founder, The International Association of Multicultural and Filipino American Educators, Inc (IAM FAME, INC.) America's Finest Teacher Award-Ulirang Guro 2015 New York City

=== Food ===
- Angela Dimayuga – chef and creative director.

=== Health ===
- Eduardo Macalino, M.D., Brooklyn – President, Philippine Medical Association of America, under the auspices of the American Medical Association

=== Media ===
- Marissa Aroy – Emmy-winning filmmaker; documentary producer of ‘‘Delano Manongs’’
- Marc Carig – MLB editor and journalist, The Athletic
- Katherine Creag – journalist, WNBC
- Anne del Castillo – Executive director, NYC Mayor's Office of Media and Entertainment
- Michael J. de la Merced – journalist, The New York Times
- Ernabel Demillo – four-time Emmy-nominated journalist; former reporter for Fox-5; host of Asian American Life on CUNY TV
- Kristine Johnson – anchor, WCBS-TV
- Ligaya Mishan – chief food critic, The New York Times
- Noel Pangilinan – editor, specializing in Filipino immigration to the United States
- Elaine Quijano – in October 2016, became the first Asian American journalist to anchor a U.S. national debate
- Frances Rivera – journalist, NBC News
- Hazel Sanchez – journalist, WCBS-TV

=== Politics and diplomacy ===
- Arvin Amatorio – councilman for Bergenfield, Bergen County, New Jersey, elected in 2014
- Carlia Brady – the first Filipino judge in New Jersey's Superior Court system
- Patrick Bumatay - United States Circuit Judge of the United States Court of Appeals for the Ninth Circuit
- Libran N. Cabactulan – Ambassador to the Permanent Mission of the Republic of the Philippines to the United Nations
- Rolando Lavarro, Jr. – Jersey City council president, elected to city council in 2011
- Peter Mendonez, Jr. – councilman for West Windsor, New Jersey, elected in 2013
- Steven Raga - member of The New York State Assembly and candidate in 2026 for New York State Senate
- Maria Torres-Springer – the first Filipina First Deputy Mayor of New York City, assuming office on October 8, 2024
- Jonathan Wong – councilman for Mahwah, New Jersey, elected in 2014

=== Religion ===
- Julian Jagudilla – director of the Migrant Center at the Church of St. Francis of Assisi, Lower Manhattan

=== Sports ===
- Benny Agbayani – retired professional Major League Baseball player on teams including the New York Mets
- Jason Brickman – former Long Island University basketball player
- Ernesto Ebuen – Six-time Philippine National Table Tennis champion; and in 2016, the top-ranked ping-pong player in the U.S.; co-founder of table tennis studio startup PingPod

=== Theatre, arts, and culture ===
- Joan Almedilla – Broadway actress, Miss Saigon, Les Misérables
- Regie Cabico – poet and spoken word artist
- Jiggly Caliente – late transgender singer, actress, activist, and drag queen (contestant on the fourth season of RuPaul's Drag Race)
- Jaremi Carey – streamer, former drag queen (contestant on the fourth season of RuPaul's Drag Race and the second season of RuPaul's Drag Race All Stars)
- Joel de la Fuente, Maplewood, New Jersey – actor
- Ali Ewoldt – Broadway actress, first Filipino/Asian American to play Christine Daaé in Phantom of the Opera
- Vanessa Hudgens – Broadway and film actress
- Vanessa Lachey (née Minnillo) – television host, actress, fashion model
- Jose Llana – Broadway actor, Drama Desk Award Winner
- Manila Luzon – drag queen
- Evelyn Mandac – soprano opera singer, orchestra soloist, recitalist, and voice teacher
- Paolo Montalban – Broadway and television actor
- Eva Noblezada – Two-time Tony-nominated Broadway actress and singer
- Ralph Peña – founding member and current artistic director of the Ma-Yi Theater Company
- Catherine Ricafort – Broadway actress
- Conrad Ricamora – multiple-award winning Broadway and screen actor
- Geena Rocero – transgender fashion supermodel and activist, founder of the Gender Proud organization
- Ninotchka Rosca – writer, activist, feminist, educator, founder of GABRIELA
- Lea Salonga – Tony Award-winning Broadway actress and singer

== See also ==
- Filipino American Museum
- New York Filipino Film Festival
- Philippine Center
- San Lorenzo Ruiz Chapel

- Asian Americans in New York City
- Bangladeshis in New York City
- Chinese people in New York City
- Demographics of New York City
- Fuzhounese in New York City
- Hispanics and Latinos in New York City
- Indians in the New York City metropolitan region
- Japanese in New York City
- Koreans in New York City
- Russians in New York City
- Taiwanese people in New York City
