= Marissa Aroy =

Emmy award-winning director

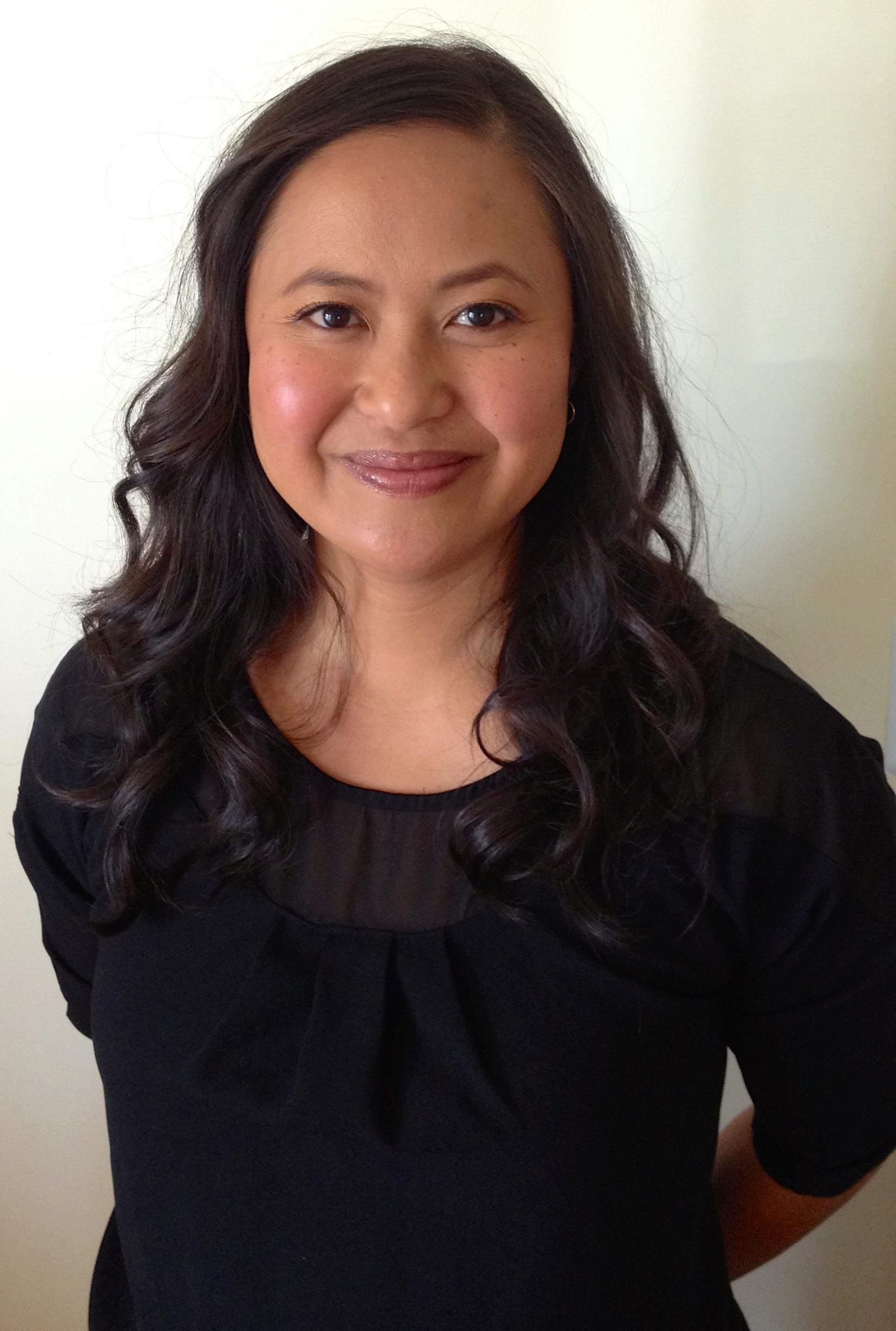
Marissa Aroy, in 2015

Marissa Aroy is a Filipino American, Emmy Award-winning director, best known for her work in the United States. She received a News and Documentary Emmy Award for the documentary, Sikhs in America, and an Emmy nomination for Outstanding Historical Programming for The Delano Manongs: Forgotten Heroes of the United Farm Workers.

A Fulbright Scholar, Aroy was listed as one of the "Notable Asian Americans in Entertainment" by the Center for Asian American Media and cited by BuzzFeed as one of the "Legendary Filipino Americans in the US." She was the Asian Centennial Distinguished Film Fellow in Residence at The College of William and Mary where she also received the Hatsuye Yamasaki Award for Asian American Visionary Leadership.

“I want someone to see our brown faces on the screen and feel proud of who we are as a people,” she said. “To see all the challenges we’re faced with in the world and to know that there are Filipinos who speak up, who fight for justice, who are heard and who are seen," she said in an article titled, "Director's Chair: The documentary filmmaker Marissa Aroy ’95 has already won an Emmy. Now she’s at work on an upcoming Smithsonian exhibit."

== Education ==
Aroy got her undergraduate degree in psychology at Boston College and later received a Master's in Journalism where she specialized in documentary film and broadcast journalism at UC Berkeley. She spent two years as a Peace Corps volunteer in the Dominican Republic working in the public health sector and creating a film about HIV/AIDS in the Dominican Republic.

== Filmmaking ==
Aroy directed a darkly suspenseful short film, Recipe (formerly known as "Losing Cock). Filmed in the Philippines, "Recipe" was based on the short story written by award-winning writer Marivi Soliven.

Grand Café, an educational telenovela, was a six-part series directed by Marissa Aroy and shown in the United States.

Aroy produced and directed the documentary Sikhs in America for which she received an Emmy. She also received an Emmy nomination for her PBS documentary The Delano Manongs: Forgotten Heroes of the United Farm Workers. This documentary highlights the role of Filipinos in the Delano Grape Strike of 1965 in California and the formation the United Farm Workers. "My goal," said Aroy in an interview for caamedia.org, "is to get Filipinos to learn about this history and be proud of it and have a better understanding of our contributions to the American fabric."

Aroy is co-founder of Media Factory, where her and her partner created interactive video elements about climate change with Bill Nye the Science Guy for the Chabot Space & Science Center, and has worked with various companies and non-profit organization to create videos and serialized content. Aroy worked with UNICEF as a video producer/communications specialist in the UNICEF New York headquarters before spending four months writing and filming stories in the Typhoon Haiyan-affected areas of the Philippines soon after the disaster.

In 2016, Aroy debuted her short film TGIF- Thank God I'm Filipino! - a response to the lack of Filipino American representation in pan Asian American media at the time.

In 2024, Aroy was commissioned to work with the Smithsonian Museum of American History on short documentary films that will part of an exhibition on Filipino American objects and history. The exhibit will run from December 2025 to November 2027.

== See also ==
- Filipinos in the New York metropolitan area
