= Philippine Independence Day Parade =

Annual event in New York City

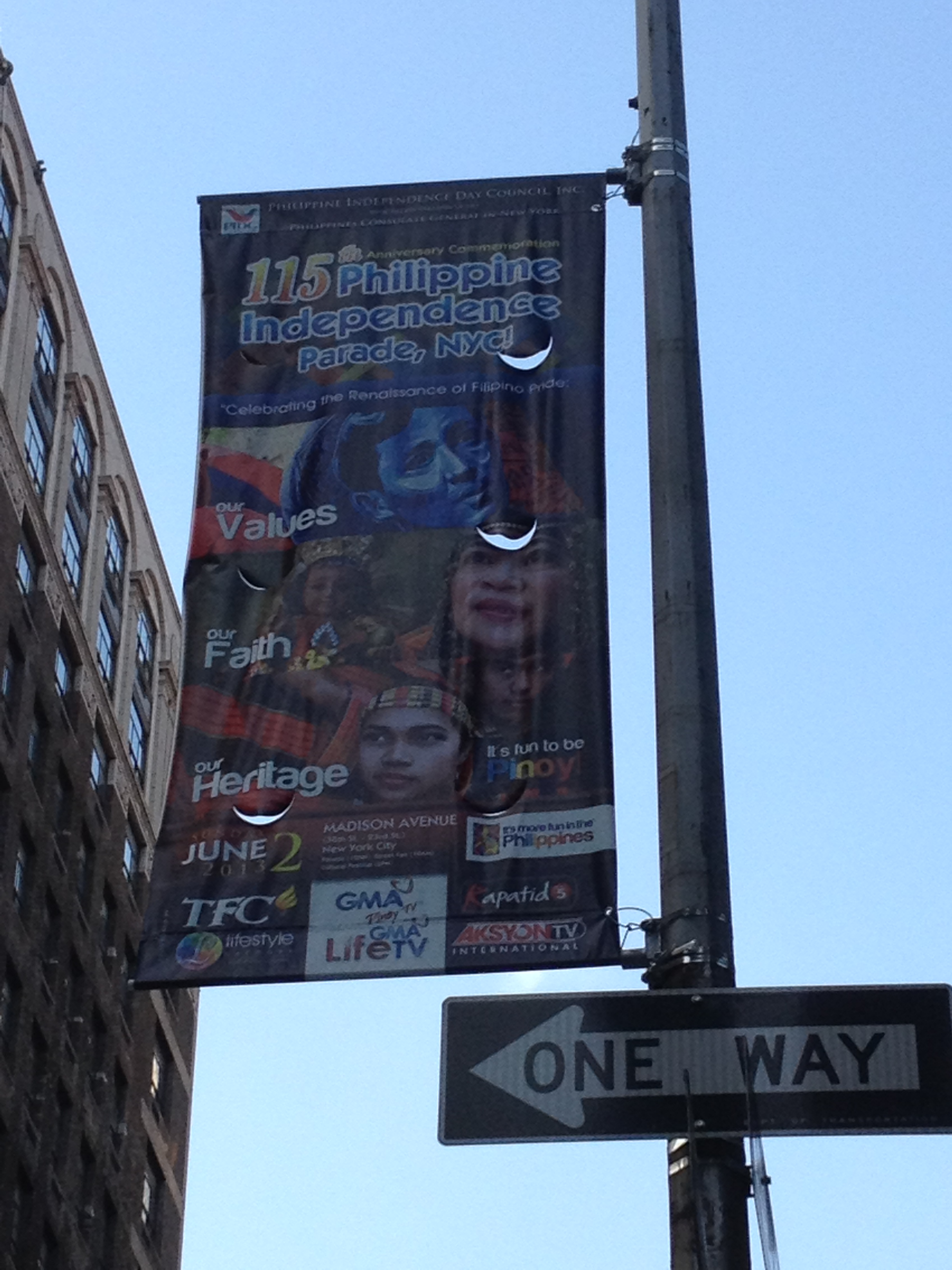
- Philippine Independence Day Parade 2013 banner, on Madison Avenue in New York City
- Also called: Philippine Day Parade, Parada ng Kalayaan
- Observed by: Filipino people around the world, particularly Filipino Americans
- Type: Filipino, Filipino American, Overseas Filipino Cultural
- Significance: The celebration of the Philippine Declaration of Independence from Spain in 1898
- 2025 date: June 1, 2025
- 2026 date: June 7, 2026
- 2027 date: June 6, 2027

The Philippine Independence Day Parade or Philippine Day Parade in New York City, the world's largest outside Manila, takes place annually in the United States along Madison Avenue in Midtown Manhattan. The parade is held on the first Sunday in June. Its main purpose is to create awareness of Philippine culture and to raise funds for charity projects in the Philippines and the United States. The Philippine Independence Day Parade is increasingly being attended by both American politicians and Filipino celebrities as well as diplomatic officials who are keenly aware of the significant and increasing political and economic power exerted by the Filipino diaspora in New York and neighboring New Jersey, Pennsylvania, and Connecticut.

Philippine Independence, as a celebration in America, has gained cultural awareness prominently after the 21st century began. Earlier generations of Filipino immigrants did not celebrate Philippine Independence in significant ways. Philippine Independence Day is now widely celebrated among Filipinos in the United States and is now a major event for many Filipino Americans to rekindle their roots and heritage and to commemorate the June 1898 presentation of the Philippine Declaration of Independence from Spain.

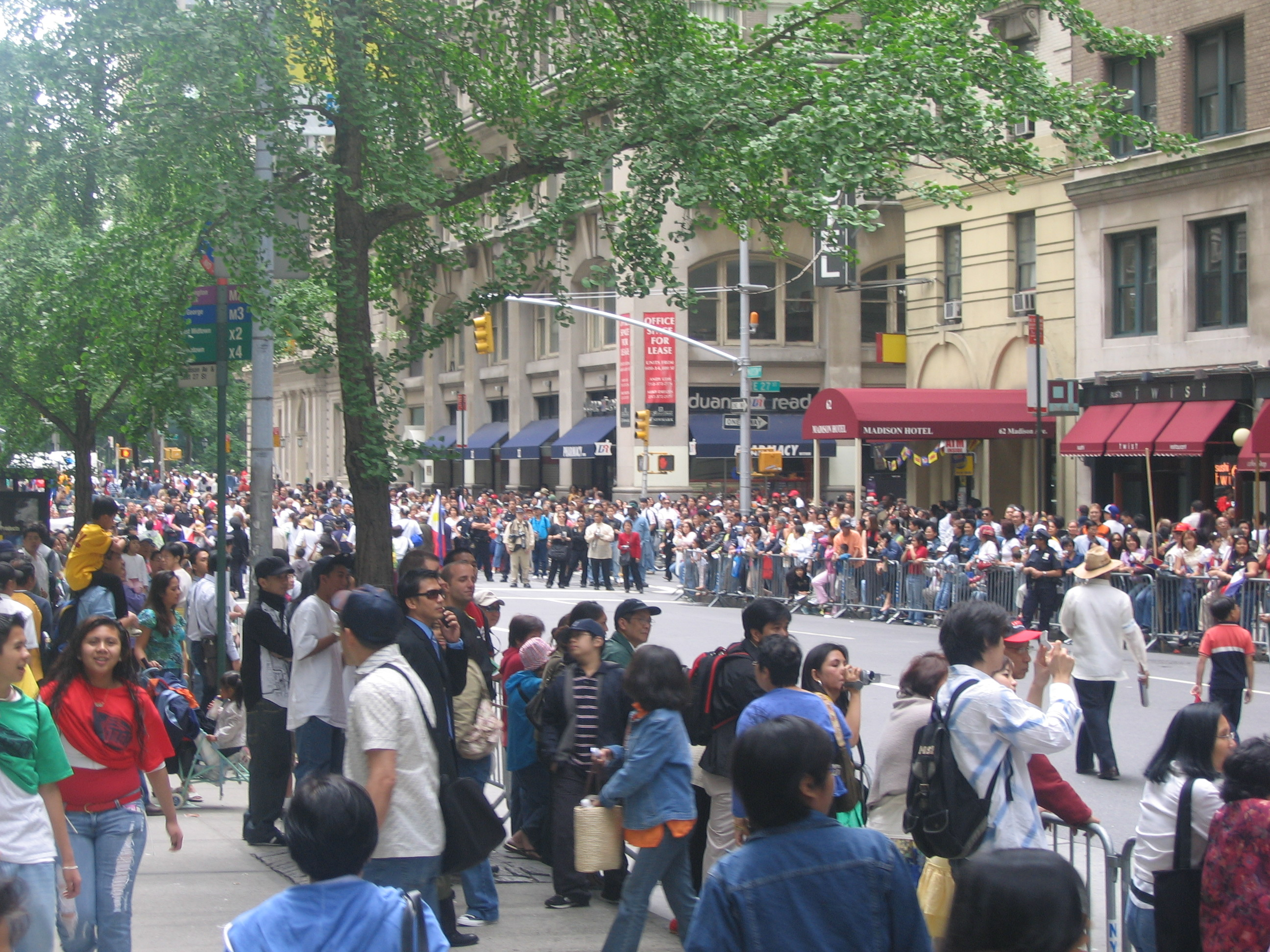

In many areas where there are significant Filipino American populations in the United States celebrate Philippine Independence in the month of June. The largest among Philippine Independence celebrations in the United States takes place in New York City every first Sunday of June. The Philippine Independence Day Parade in New York City attracts over 200,000 people.

The 2026 Philippine Independence Day Parade in New York City took place on June 7, 2026 at Madison Avenue, following the tradition of the celebration being on the first Sunday of June. The 2027 Philippine Independence Day Parade in New York City will take place on June 6, 2027.

There were no parades in 2020 and 2021 as it went on hiatus due to the COVID-19 pandemic.

== Events ==
=== 2026 ===
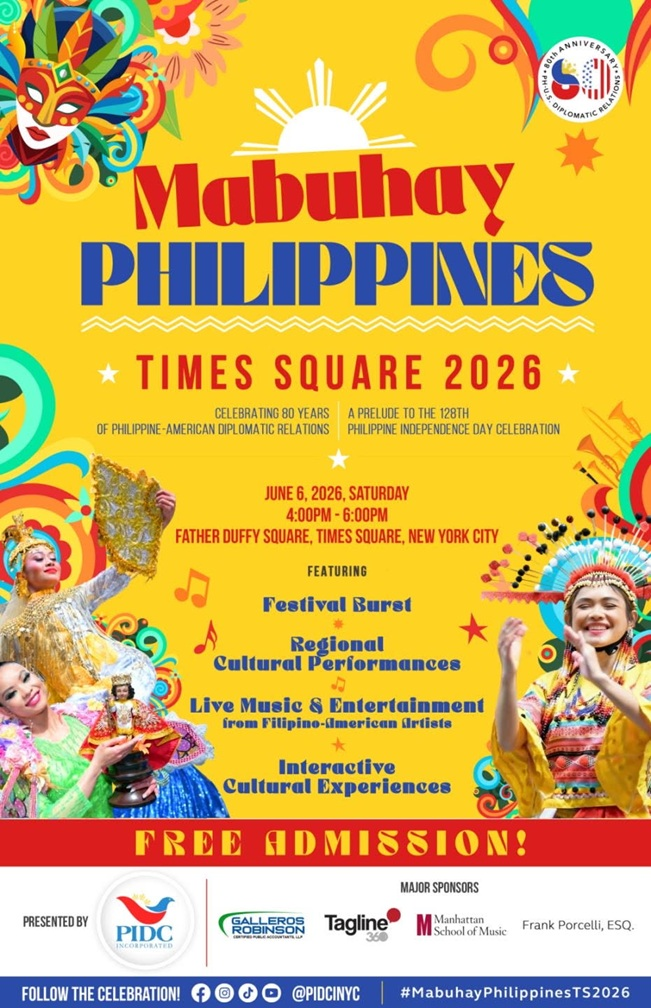
Mabuhay Philippines 2026! Event flyer for Philippine Independence Day Parade

On June 7, 2026, the Filipino-American community in New York City launched the 128th Philippine Independence Day celebrations and commemorated the 80th anniversary of Philippines–United States diplomatic relations with “Mabuhay, Philippines!” in Times Square. Organized by the Philippine Independence Day Council, Inc. (PIDCI) with support from the Philippine Consulate General in New York, the event marked the first Filipino cultural showcase held in Times Square and featured traditional and contemporary Filipino music and dance performances, including presentations of the Lambayok Festival, Sinulog, Kaliga Festival, Tinikling, Subli, and Maguindanao dances. Philippine and Filipino-American officials described the celebration as a tribute to Philippine independence, Filipino cultural heritage, and the longstanding bilateral relationship and people-to-people ties between the Philippines and the United States.

== Other parts of the world ==
=== Passaic, Jersey City, New Jersey ===
Several celebrations dedicated to Philippine Independence are done throughout the world. An example of this would be a smaller annual Philippine Independence Day Parade held in early June in Passaic, New Jersey. This parade is organized by a large Filipino and Filipino-American organization known as the Philippine Day Organizing Council (PDOC). Another major Philippine parade is held in New Jersey called the Philippine-American Friendship Day Parade in Jersey City, New Jersey, it is held every fourth Sunday of June to celebrate Philippine-American Friendship Day, which is July 4. The Philippine government declared July 4 every year as Philippine-American Friendship Day after the celebration of Philippine Independence Day was moved from July 4 to June 12.

=== Toronto, Canada ===
Toronto hosts an annual Philippine Independence Day Celebration.

=== San Francisco, California ===
San Francisco celebrates Philippine Independence Day annually at Union Square. The Philippine flag is raised at the San Francisco City Hall every June 12 as a commemoration of the event and for San Francisco's large Filipino community.

=== Seattle, Washington ===
Seattle celebrates Philippine Independence Day through the "Pagdiriwang Festival," held every June at the Seattle Center.

== Past issues ==
=== Discrimination against attendees of the 2018 NYC Philippine Independence Day Parade ===
New York City rejected a formal complaint of discrimination and found no violation of the City zoning code when attendees of the June 3, 2018, Philippine Independence day parade were cleared from a designated New York City Madison Avenue public plaza on the parade route. The public plaza was then barricaded, patrolled by building security and access denied to the parade crowd. New York City officials, in rejecting the complaints filed by witnesses, offered no explanation why the largely Filipino crowd could not sit or stand in the public plaza which is designated to be open 24 hours for public use.

== See also ==
- History of Filipino Americans
- Demographics of Filipino Americans
- Filipinos in the New York City metropolitan region
