= Ron Magden =

American historian (1926–2019)

- Born: 1926; Mountain Home, Idaho
- Died: 2019 (aged 92–93); Tacoma, Washington
- Education: University of Washington
- Employer: Tacoma Community College
- Organization(s): Tacoma Historical Society, ILWU Education Committee, Harry Bridges Center for Labor Studies
- Notable work: The Working Longshoreman (1991); A History of Seattle Waterfront Workers (1991); Furusato: Tacoma-Pierce County Japanese, 1888-1977 (1998); Mukashi, Mukashi =: Long, Long Ago: The First Century of the Seattle Buddhist Church (2008)

Ronald "Ron" Magden (1926 - 2019) was a historian from Tacoma, Washington who specialized in maritime labor history and Japanese-American history in the Puget Sound region.

== Early life and career ==
Ron Magden was born in Mountain Home, Idaho. Magden credited his early interest in history and social movements to his mother, who he described as a "very forceful union person and [...] very opposed to racial discrimination of any kind." Magden was in high school in 1941 when Pearl Harbor was bombed and the US entered World War II and observed the anti-Japanese sentiment in Boise and the mass incarceration of Japanese-Americans during that time. In 1965, Magden received his PhD in history from the University of Washington. He began teaching at the newly opened Tacoma Community College, teaching the second ever class offered at the institution.

== Contributions to labor history ==
In the early 1980s, Magden was commissioned by ILWU, local 23, and the Port of Tacoma to write a history of the union, funded by a grant from the Washington Commission for the Humanities. The commission had originally been granted to Tacoma writer and journalist Mary Deaton, but she was removed from the project after taking a pro-CIO position in her original draft that at times presented the union in a negative light. Magden was hired to finish the project, and in 1982 he published The Working Waterfront: Tacoma's Ships and Men with Art Martinson. The book was primarily based on oral history interviews with retired longshore pensioners. Magden published an updated version of the book, titled The Working Longshoreman, in 1991. The Port of Tacoma continues to regularly use Magden's book as a point of reference into the present-day.

In 1987, Magden was approached by ILWU, local 19 (Seattle longshore local), to write a history of their union. For the next three years, Magden interviewed pensioners every week. His book A History of Seattle Waterfront Workers, 1884-1934 was published in 1991.

Magden engaged in a number of projects in the later half of his life to promote labor history education. At the urging of Tacoma longshoreman and labor leader Phil Lelli, Magden continued writing articles about waterfront history for the Port of Tacoma's Pacific Gateway magazine and served on the ILWU Education Committee to help educate newer union members about the union's history. Magden served a term as president of the Tacoma Historical Society. In addition, Magden also helped found the Harry Bridges Center for Labor Studies and the Labor Archives of Washington at the University of Washington.

As an act of gratitude for his work in publishing The Working Waterfront, Magden was named an honorary member of the Pacific Coast Pensioners' Association, the ILWU's organization for retired longshore workers. In recognition for his contributions to the fields of labor and maritime history, Magden was named the 2012 Labor History Person of the Year by the Pacific Northwest Labor History Association.

== Japanese-American historical research ==
Though best known for his contributions to the field of labor history, Magden also published two books about Japanese Americans in the Puget Sound region. His first book on the subject, Furusato: Tacoma-Pierce County Japanese, 1888-1977, was published in 1998. Magden worked closely with the Japanese American community in Pierce County to reconstruct a history of the community before the mass incarceration from Executive Order 9066 in World War II. Magden also published Mukashi, Mukashi =: Long, Long Ago: The First Century of the Seattle Buddhist Church about the Seattle Betsuin Buddhist Temple in 2008.

== Selected list of published material ==
- Magden, Ron and Martinson, Art. The Working Longshoreman. Tacoma Longshore Book & Res, 1991.
- Magden, Ron. A History of Seattle Waterfront Workers. Tacoma Longshore Book & Res, 1991.
- Magden, Ron. Furusato: Tacoma-Pierce County Japanese, 1888-1977. Tacoma Longshore Book & Res, 1998.
- Magden, Ron. Mukashi, Mukashi =: Long, Long Ago: The First Century of the Seattle Buddhist Church. Seattle Betsuin Buddhist Temple, 2008.
- Schwartz, Harvey with Magden, Ron. Labor Under Siege: Big Bob McEllrath and the ILWU's Fight for Organized Labor in an Anti-Union Era. University of Washington Press, 2022.

== See also ==
- Ottilie Markholt
- Ross Rieder
- Phil Lelli
