= Shaun Maloney (labor activist) =

American labor activist (1911–1999)

Shaun "Jack" Maloney (1911–1999) was an American labor activist active in the Midwestern United States in the 20s and 30s and the West Coast of the United States after 1942. Though he was best known for his role in the 1934 Minneapolis Teamster Strike, Maloney was also an important figure in the International Longshore and Warehouse Union in the 1970s.

== Biography ==
Shaun McGillin Maloney
- Born: September 10, 1911; Minneapolis, Minnesota
- Died: December 19, 1999 (aged 88); Seattle, Washington
- Other names: Jack Severson, John Severson, Jack Maloney

Maloney was born on 10 September 1911 in Minneapolis. His mother was an Irish nationalist and his step-father, Ole Severson, was a Teamster and Wobbly. In his early life he was known as Jack or John Severson after his step father, but he began to use his biological father's name around 1936 after receiving federal documents under that name. He was called Jack by people who knew him from Minneapolis but was called Shaun by his fellow sailors and longshore workers.

Maloney dropped out of school in eighth grade and worked driving delivery wagons and as a field worker. In the 1920s, he joined the IWW and Teamsters, local 574 and became acquainted with Trotskyist labor organizers Carl Skoglund, Vincent R. Dunne, and Miles Dunne. He participated in the Minneapolis general strike of 1934 as a picket captain and a member of the negotiating committee. Maloney was injured when police fired into a crowd of strikers on what became known as "Bloody Friday."

Following the 1934 strike, Maloney continued organizing truck drivers in the Midwest. In 1940, he was jailed when during a strike by the North Central District Drivers Council a delivery van was destroyed. After his release from prison in 1942 Maloney joined the United States Merchant Marine to avoid being drafted into a war he did not support. After sailing once to Russia in a convoy that suffered heavily casualties, he moved to the West Coast and sailed between Seattle and Alaska.

Maloney sailed for many years and was active with the Sailors' Union of the Pacific until he was expelled with dozens of others in the Mahoney Beef of 1949. He joined the International Longshoremen's and Warehousemen's Union in 1953. In the ILWU, Maloney became known as one of the leading left-wing critics of Harry Bridges and the Mechanization and Modernization Agreement of 1960. He was elected president of Local 19 five times and served in various other leadership positions.

Maloney retired in 1976 but remained active in the labor movement. Despite being unable to walk, he participated in the Seattle WTO Protests just three weeks before his death. He died on 19 December 1999.

== See also ==
- Farrell Dobbs
- Phil Lelli
- Ottilie Markholt
- Jerry Tyler
