= Yuri Nosenko: Double Agent =

- Written by: Stephen Davis
- Directed by: Mick Jackson
- Starring: Tommy Lee Jones; Josef Sommer; Oleg Rudnik
- Music by: Peter Howell

Production
- Executive producer: David Elstein
- Producers: Graham Massey; Elizabeth Small; David Streit
- Cinematography: David Feig
- Editor: Jim Latham
- Running time: 89 minutes
- Production company: HBO Showcase

Original release
- Network: HBO
- Release: 7 September 1986

Yuri Nosenko: Double Agent is a 1986 American–British television drama produced by the BBC and directed by Mick Jackson.

This film tells the true-life story of Yuri Nosenko, a top Soviet KGB agent who defected to the West at the height of the Cold War in 1964.

== Plot ==
Three months after the assassination of President John Fitzgerald Kennedy, Soviet KGB officer Yuri Nosenko defected to the CIA claiming to have been Lee Harvey Oswald's case officer, handler or contact. It resulted in a 3-year battle of wits between Nosenko and high-flying career US Government agent Steve Daley within the power politics inside the CIA.

== Cast ==
- Tommy Lee Jones as Steve Daley
- Josef Sommer as James Angleton
- Ed Lauter as Jerry Tyler
- Oleg Rudnik as Yuri Nosenko
- Edwin Adams as John Collins
- Kevin Cooney as Don Fisher

== Production ==
The film was originally produced as Double Image, episode 23 of season 2 of the British anthology series Screen Two, broadcast 6 April 1986.
