= Ottilie Markholt =

American historian (1916-2004)

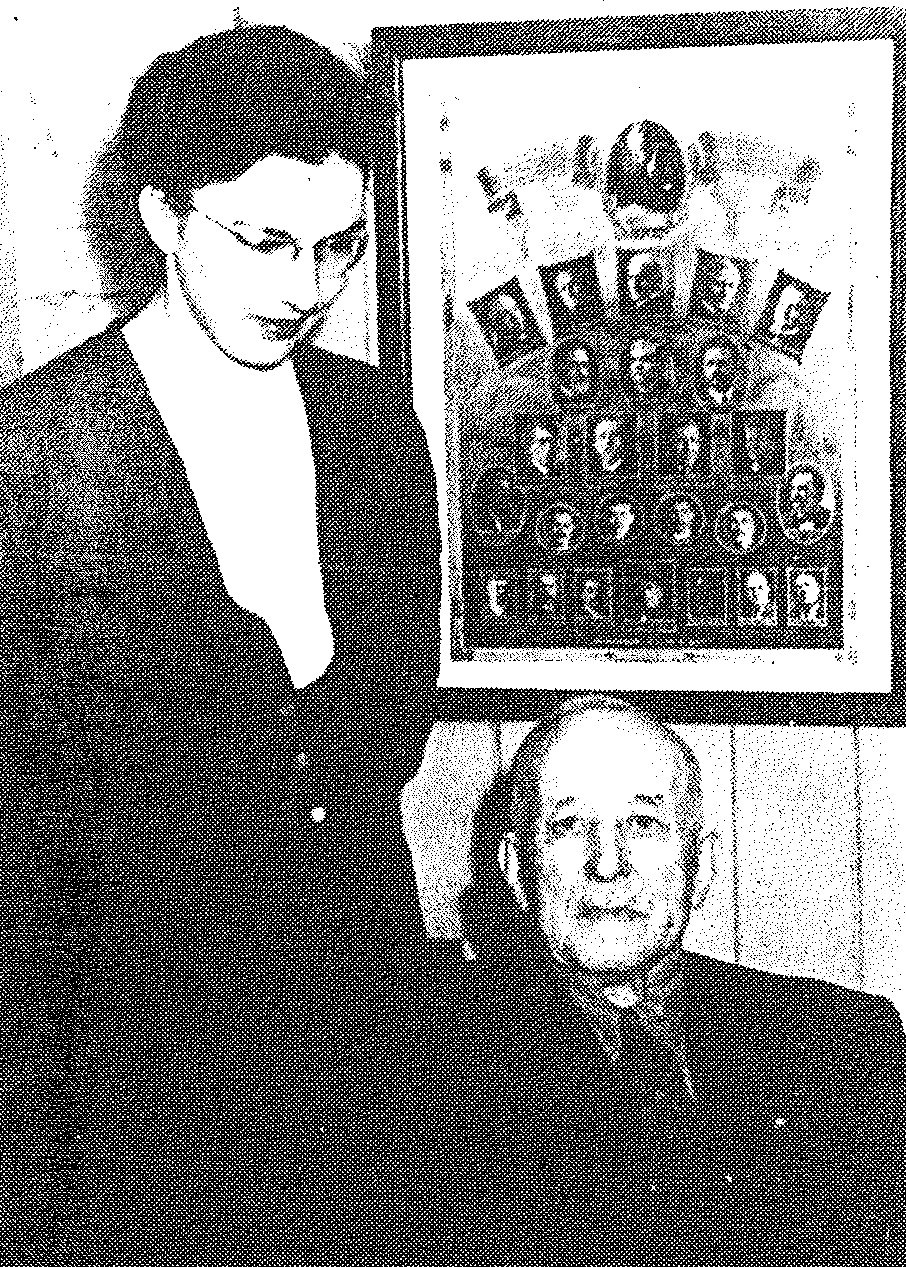
- Ottilie Markholt with Peter B. Gill in 1943
- Born: Ottilie Kepner; February 25, 1916; Candle, Territory of Alaska
- Died: November 25, 2004 (aged 88); Tacoma, Washington, U.S.
- Organizations: Communist Party USA; Congress of Racial Equality; Industrial Workers of the World; OPEIU, local 23; Tacoma NAACP
- Notable work: Maritime Solidarity: Pacific Coast Unionism, 1929-1938; The Concern of All: Tacoma Working People and Their Unions, 1883-1895
- Spouses: Robert (Bob) Dombroff (married 1935-1941); Halvor Markholt (married 1943-1953)
- Children: Bob Markholt (1937-2009); Lee Markholt (1939-2020)
- Parents: Alfred Silverthorne Kepner; Clara Reissennweber Kepner

Ottilie Markholt (February 25, 1916 – November 25, 2004) was an American trade unionist, labor historian, and political activist who spent most of her life in Tacoma, Washington. At different points in her life, Markholt was a member of the Communist Party, CORE, NAACP, IWW, and OPEIU. Markholt authored multiple books and countless articles about labor history on the West Coast and made efforts to expand labor studies and education.

== Biography ==
Ottilie Lou Markholt (née Kepner) was born in Candle, Territory of Alaska, on February 25, 1916, to Alfred Silverthorne Kepner, a territorial judge, and Clara Reissennweber Kepner, a schoolteacher from Chicago. She moved to Seattle with her family in 1921 and graduated as valedictorian from West Seattle High School in 1933.

Markholt first became involved in left wing organizing as a student at the University of Washington from 1933 to 1935. In 1935, she joined the Young Communist League and dropped out of college to devote more time to labor organizing. In December 1935, Ottilie married Bob Dombroff, a sailor and member of the Communist Party. The couple had two sons, Bob and Lee, born in 1937 and 1939 respectively. Markholt and Dombroff divorced in 1941.

After divorcing Dombroff, Markholt moved to Tacoma and began working for the Tacoma Metal Trades Council in 1943. Markholt became involved in OPEIU, local 23, and began working for the union as an office secretary in 1949. She held this job until her retirement in 1981.

In 1943, Ottilie married Halvor Markholt, a timekeeper at the shipyards whom she had met through Local 23. Both Ottilie and her children assumed his last name, and in 1945, the family moved to a farm south of Tacoma. The couple divorced in 1953. As a single mother, Markholt worked hard to tend to the farm and provide for her children while money was extremely tight.

== Activism ==
Bob Dombroff, Markholt's first husband, was a member of the Sailors' Union of the Pacific and the Maritime Federation of the Pacific Coast, a short-lived red union. Markholt and Dombroff left the Communist Party in 1936 due to disagreements with Harry Bridges but remained members of the MFPC. In 1937, Markholt compiled the book Union Labels for Union Men and worked with Ralph Chaplin to edit the MFPC's newspaper Voice of Federation. Markholt also organized the Seattle Women's Maritime Auxiliary to the MFPC.

After leaving the Communist Party, Markholt remained involved in the labor movement and civil rights activism. In the 1950s, she organized against two initiatives that sought to make Washington a right to work state. Markholt became involved with the Civil Rights Movement in the 1960s. She became involved with the Congress of Racial Equality while traveling to Buffalo, New York, in 1964 and was an organizer in the Seattle School Boycott of 1966. She also served as editor of the Tacoma NAACP newsletter. In 1971, Markholt joined the Tacoma-Olympia branch of the Industrial Workers of the World and served as the branch secretary for many years.

Much of Markholt's later activism focused on labor education. She served as the first Education Committee Chair for the Pierce County Central Labor Council and, along with Ross Rieder and other local activists, was a founding member of the Pacific Northwest Labor History Association. In the 1970s and 1980s, Markholt made efforts to design labor history curricula for community colleges. She worked with her son Bob, who was instructing labor studies courses at Tacoma Community College. In 1989, Markholt coordinated the publication of her book To Live in Dignity and a photographic history exhibit for Washington State centennial celebrations.

== Research ==
Markholt wrote a plethora of material related to labor history throughout her life, including countless articles, newsletters, and manuscripts. She worked with Peter Gill to complete a manuscript for Sailors' Union of the Pacific, an early history of the union. The book was originally credited solely to Gill. Her most notable work, Maritime Solidarity: Pacific Coast Unionism, 1929-1938 built on earlier research from Sailors' Union of the Pacific. Encouraged by Ralph Chaplin and Archie Green, Markholt worked on the book in the 1950s and published it in 1998 after raising money through community donations.

Markholt wrote a number of other books and manuscripts, including Nome, Alaska's Early Union Movement and The Concern of All: Tacoma Working People and Their Unions, 1883-1895 in 1984, funded by the Pierce County Central Labor Council. She also wrote a biography of her parents, Alaska Homestead, in 1947, and an autobiography, Against the Current, completed around 2001. In addition to her own writing, Markholt also assisted many others in their research, including Ron Magden and Harold Huycke

== Later life ==
Markholt continued to be involved in labor activism after her retirement, joining picket lines with her family. She died in Tacoma on November 25, 2004. A memorial was held at the ILWU Local 23 Hall in Fife, Washington, in January 2005. Her papers from her activism, research, and writing are held at the Labor Archives of Washington.

== See also ==
- Ron Magden
- Ross Rieder
- Phil Lelli
- Shaun Maloney
