= John Sessions Memorial Award =

American library award

- Type: Library award
- Awarded for: Labor history
- Description: Named in honor of John Sessions of the AFL-CIO
- Sponsored by: American Library Association
- Established: 1981; 45 years ago
- Website: Award page

The John Sessions Memorial Award is presented annually by the Reference and User Services Association of the American Library Association. It recognizes a library or library system which has made a significant effort to work with the labor community and by doing so has brought recognition to the history and contribution of the labor movement to the development of the United States. John Sessions of the American Federation of Labor and Congress of Industrial Organizations (AFL-CIO) was co-chair of the AFL-CIO/ ALA Joint Committee on Library Service to Labor Groups. The article, "A Fifty-Five Year Partnership: ALA and the AFL-CIO" provides additional background.

== Award winners ==
John Sessions Memorial Award

- 2026- Genesee Historical Collections Center. University of Michigan-Flint.
- 2025- Labor Archives of Washington, University of Washington Libraries Special Collections.
- 2024-no award
- 2023- Princeton University Industrial Relations Library wins 2023 John Sessions Memorial Award]
- 2022- Irwin Nash Photo Collection of the Washington State University Libraries, Manuscripts, Archives and Special Collections. Among the photographs is documentation of Guadalupe (Lupe) Gamboa and Michael Fox who were arrested for attempting to alert farm workers of the right to organize—a case that went to the Washington State Supreme Court. This case secured the right for organizers to visit labor camps.
- 2021-Labor Archives of Washington, University of Washington Libraries Special Collections. "For its proactive efforts to reflect a more representative working-class history of the Pacific Northwest through its practices to address representation gaps in occupational communities, racial and ethnic groups, women, LGBTQ+ workers, and other historically marginalized communities. For its collaborative oral history project documenting workers in the Covid-19 pandemic."
- 2020-Labor Collections of the Archives and Special Collections of the UAA/APU Consortium Library. (University of Alaska Anchorage and Alaska Pacific University)."For their consolidation of access to extensive archival materials relating to the history of labor and labor relations in Alaska and their support of the Alaska labor community in which one out of every 5 workers is a member of a union, the Labor Collections of the Archives and Special Collections of the UAA/APU Consortium Library was unanimously selected.
- 2019- No Award.
- 2018. The Iowa Labor Collection and Iowa Labor History Oral Project, State Historical Society of Iowa.
- 2017. The East Side Freedom Library (ESFL), an independent library located in the Payne-Phalen neighborhood of Saint Paul, Minnesota. The ESFL has successfully built relationships with organized labor and community groups that facilitate the empowerment, learning, and engagement of working people. It is located in a former Carnegie Library.
- 2016. The Center for Labor Education and Research, University of Hawai‘i – West O‘ahu “The mission of the labor archive at the Center for Labor Education and Research (CLEAR) is to preserve labor history materials for future generations, protect the artifacts and make them accessible for public use, and defend the importance of working class history.”
- 2015. Calcasieu Parish Library System in Louisiana. For Southwest Louisiana Workforce Research Guide.
- 2014. Local History and Genealogy Department of Toledo-Lucas County Public Library (Ohio). For outreach efforts to local labor unions, the special labor collection, exhibits and displays of the area and national labor movement, and of the Rogowski-Kaptur Labor History Room, which houses materials with a focus on Northwest Ohio and Southeast Michigan labor history but also includes materials on national labor history.
- 2013. Labor Archives of Washington. University of Washington Libraries Special Collections.
- 2012. San Francisco State University Labor Archives and Research Center. J. Paul Leonard Library
- 2011 Russell Library, Middletown, Connecticut, Business & Career Programs.
- 2010 Murray-Green Library at Roosevelt University, Chicago
- 2009 Wirtz Labor Library U.S. Department of Labor.A statement issued by the library expressed gratitude and appreciation for the distinction: “The U.S. Department of Labor’s library, established in 1917, is one of the oldest Cabinet-level libraries. As we plan for the library’s centennial, our recent efforts have been to strengthen and revitalize the library and its services – and to provide and promote the library’s resources to a wider universe of customers. As we build upon our rich history, it is our great pleasure to accept the 2009 John Sessions Memorial Award.”
- 2008 The Walter P. Reuther Library of Labor and Union Affairs, Wayne State University
- 2007 James B. Carey Library-Rutgers, School of Management and Labor Relations. Part of the Rutgers University Libraries system
- 2006 Joan Cassidy - New York State United Teachers (NYSUT) headquarters librarian for creating the Albert Shanker 'Where We Stand' database."
- 2005 Bridgeport (CT) Public Library's Historical Collection. Mary K. Witkowski, head of the Historical Collection, accepted the award on behalf of the Bridgeport Public Library. Local labor history, an oral history project with audio and transcripts on-line, and a curriculum created with the help of area teachers. " The library has done a great service to the community of Bridgeport by making available a part of their working class history to the world."
- 2004 Ruth A. Haas Library, Western Connecticut State University, Danbury, Conn.
- 2003 Friends of the Saint Paul Public Library
- 2002 The Web Design Group for the Allegheny County Labor Council
- 2001 Duane G. Meyer Library, Southwest Missouri State University
- 2000 Lodi Memorial Library of Lodi, New Jersey
- 1999 Libraries for the Future
- 1998 The Institute of Industrial Relations Library
- 1997 Englewood (NJ) Public Library
- 1996 Metropolitan Detroit Professionals Library, UAW Local 2200
- 1995 Special Collections and University Archives, Rutgers University Libraries and Butte-Silver Bow Public Archives, Labor History Collection, Butte, Montana
- 1994 Archives of Labor and Urban Affairs, Walter P. Reuther Library, Wayne State University
- 1993 Texas Labor Archives, University of Texas at Arlington
- 1992 National Association of Letter Carriers, Information Center, Washington, D.C.
- 1991 Department of Archives and Special Collections, Ohio University Libraries, Athens, Ohio
- 1990 Hennepin County Library, Minnetonka, Minnesota
- 1989 Citizens Library (Peter G. Sullivan, Director), Washington
- 1988 Southern Labor Archives, Georgia State University
- 1987 Lorain (Ohio) Public Library
- 1986 Martin P. Catherwood Library, Cornell University, Ithaca, New York
- 1985 Birmingham (Alabama) Public Library
- 1984 Jackson-George Regional Library System, Pascagoula, Mississippi
- 1983 State Historical Society of Wisconsin Library
- 1982 Wagner Labor Archives/ Robert F. Wagner Archives, New York University
- 1981. Muncie Indiana Public Library. (Arthur Meyers, Director).

== See also ==
- List of social sciences awards
