= Alfred Hahn =

American architect (1890–1964)

Alfred A. Hahn (1890–1964) was an architect in Toledo, Ohio, and the founder of the Hahn and Hayes architectural firm. He designed the United States Post Office in Oberlin, Ohio (1934) in neoclassical architecture style. It was dedicated in 1933. The contract for the post office in Oberlin was $85,000.

Hahn along with Harry Hake and Frank Bail designed the Art Deco style Ohio State Office Building (1929) at 65 Front Street in Columbus, Ohio.

Hahn designed the Hillcrest Hotel, also known as Hillcrest Arms Apartment Hotel, at 1603 Madison Avenue in Toledo with H.J. Spieker. It is listed on the National Register of Historic Places for Lucas County. The building was still in use in 2008 and part of a foreclosure effort over a loan default.

Hahn's son Alfred A. Hahn, Jr., was also an architect in Toledo architect and became a partner in the firm in 1940.

== Projects ==
- Hillcrest Hotel (also known as the Hillcrest Arms Apartment Hotel), at 1603 Madison Avenue in Toledo with H.J. Spieker.
- Ohio State Office Building (1929) at 65 Front Street in Columbus, Ohio with Harry Hake and Frank Bail
- Oberlin Post Office (1933–1934)
- Toledo-Lucas County Public Library, Main Library, 325 N. Michigan Street, Toledo. Ohio
