= Wirtz Labor Library =

Library of the U.S. Department of Labor

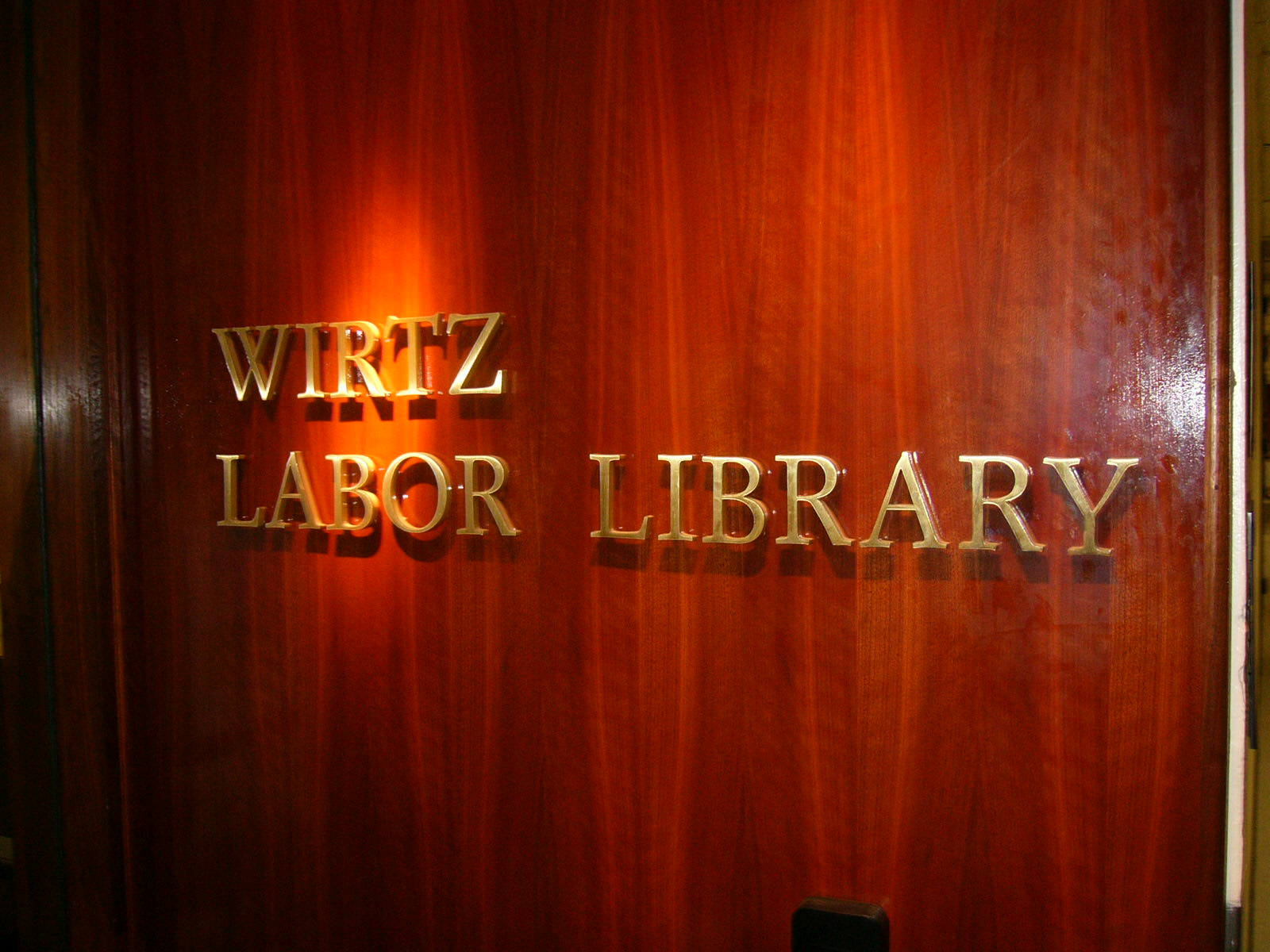
- 38.893396°N 77.014514°W
- Location: Washington, DC

Other information
- Website: https://www.dol.gov/agencies/oasam/centers-offices/business-operations-center/library

The Wirtz Labor Library is the library of the U.S. Department of Labor. It provides Department of Labor employees and members of the general public with access to both historically significant and current resources pertaining to labor. It is located in the Frances Perkins Building in Washington, D.C.

Established in 1917, the U.S. Department of Labor Library was created with the consolidation of the libraries of the former Children's Bureau and the Bureau of Labor Statistics. The Library's collection documents the history of labor, labor unions and the growth and development of the labor movement in a national and international perspective. The Wirtz Library won the John Sessions Memorial Award for library service to labor from the American Library Association in 2009.

== Background ==
The library's online catalog provides access to all materials acquired since 1975 and to selected pre-1975 items. The library is the recipient of the 2009 John Sessions Memorial Award.

The Library was dedicated in honor of former U.S. Secretary of Labor Willard Wirtz and his wife Jane Quisenberry Wirtz on March 28, 2000. It is a federal depository library, and in 2000 was designated a Millennium Library by the White House Millennium Council in recognition of its unique historical holdings.

== Collections ==
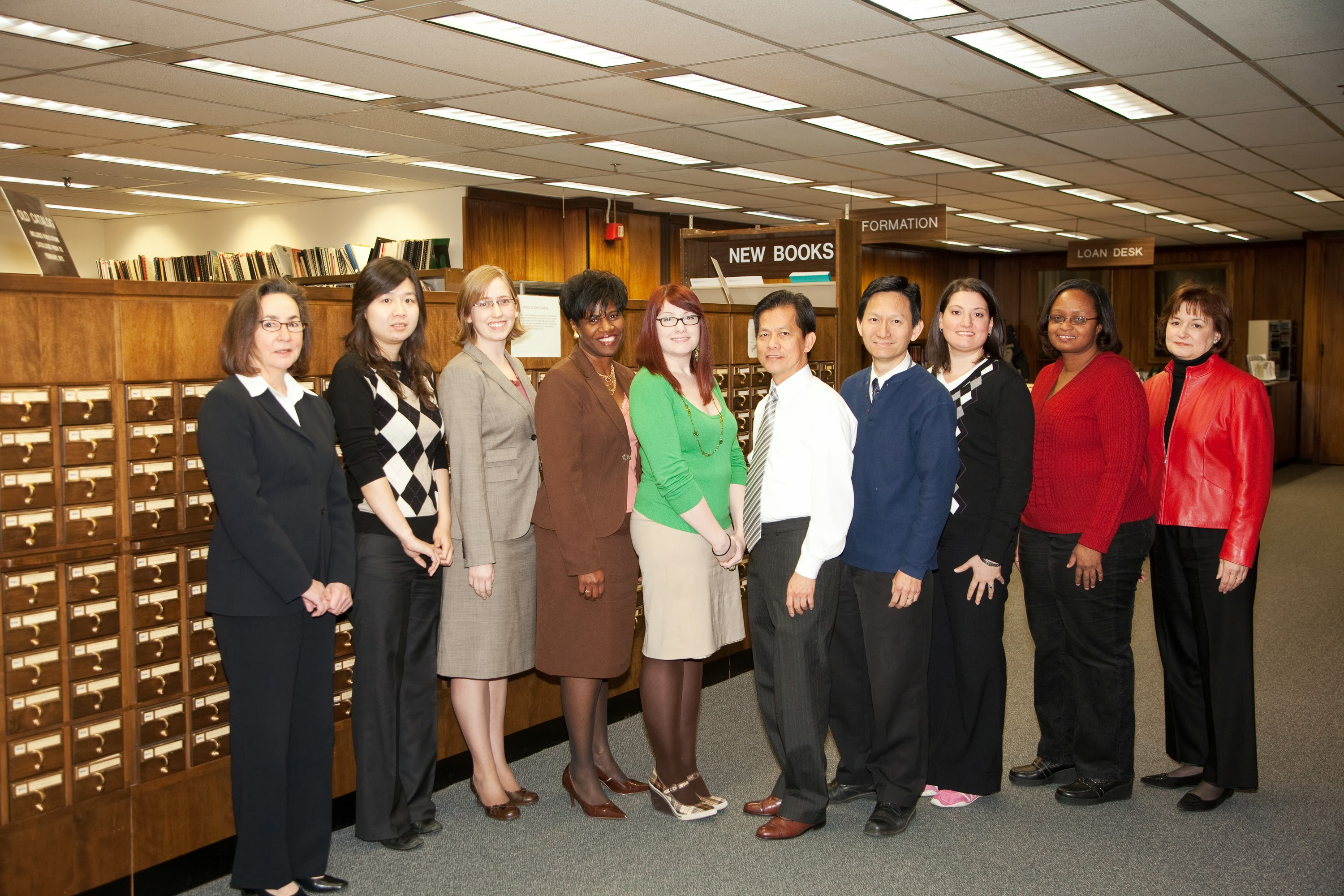
Staff in 2009

The library contains 181,000 items, including the James Taylor collection (labor history), the Folio collection (trade union serials), the department's Portrait Collection and a 30,000 volume labor law collection.
