= Mick Jackson (director) =

English filmmaker and TV producer (born 1943)

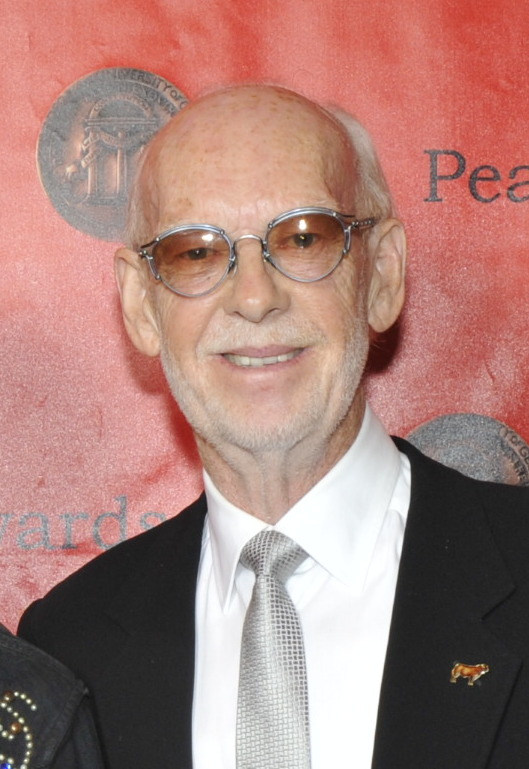
- Mick Jackson at the 70th Annual Peabody Awards in 2011
- Born: 4 October 1943 (age 83); Aveley, England
- Occupations: Director, Producer

Mick Jackson (born 4 October 1943) is an English film director and television producer best known for the 1984 BAFTA Award-winning television film Threads. He is also known for directing projects such as the comedy L.A. Story (1991), the romance drama The Bodyguard (1992), the HBO film Temple Grandin (2010), and the drama Denial (2016).

== Early life and education ==
Jackson was born on 4 October 1943 in the settlement of Aveley in Essex, England. He attended Palmer's School before graduating with a Bachelor of Arts in electronics at the University of Southampton and a postgraduate degree in drama from the University of Bristol.

== Career ==
Between 1973 and 1987, he directed many documentary and drama productions for BBC TV and Channel 4, including the 1984 Cold War television film Threads. He also directed theatrical feature films, including L.A. Story (1991), Volcano (1997) and the Kevin Costner-Whitney Houston thriller The Bodyguard (1992).

== Accolades ==
Jackson won an Emmy for Outstanding Directing for a Miniseries, Movie or a Dramatic Special for the biopic television film Temple Grandin.

He also won the Television Single Drama category for Threads at the 1985 BAFTA Awards.

== Filmography ==
=== Film ===
- Chattahoochee (1989)
- L.A. Story (1991)
- The Bodyguard (1992)
- Clean Slate (1994)
- Volcano (1997)
- The First $20 Million Is Always the Hardest (2002)
- Denial (2016)

=== Television ===
Documentaries

- The Ascent of Man (1973, 13-episode series)
- Connections (1978, 10-episode series)
- The Real Thing (1980, 6-episode series)

Dramas

- How to Pick Up Girls! (1978)
- People from the Forest (1981)
- Threads (1984)
- Yuri Nosenko: Double Agent (1986)
- Life Story (1987)
- A Very British Coup (1988)
- Indictment: The McMartin Trial (1995)
- Tuesdays with Morrie (1999)
- Live from Baghdad (2002)
- Covert One: The Hades Factor (2006)
- The Memory Keeper's Daughter (2008)
- Temple Grandin (2010)
