= Hillcrest Hotel =

- U.S. National Register of Historic Places
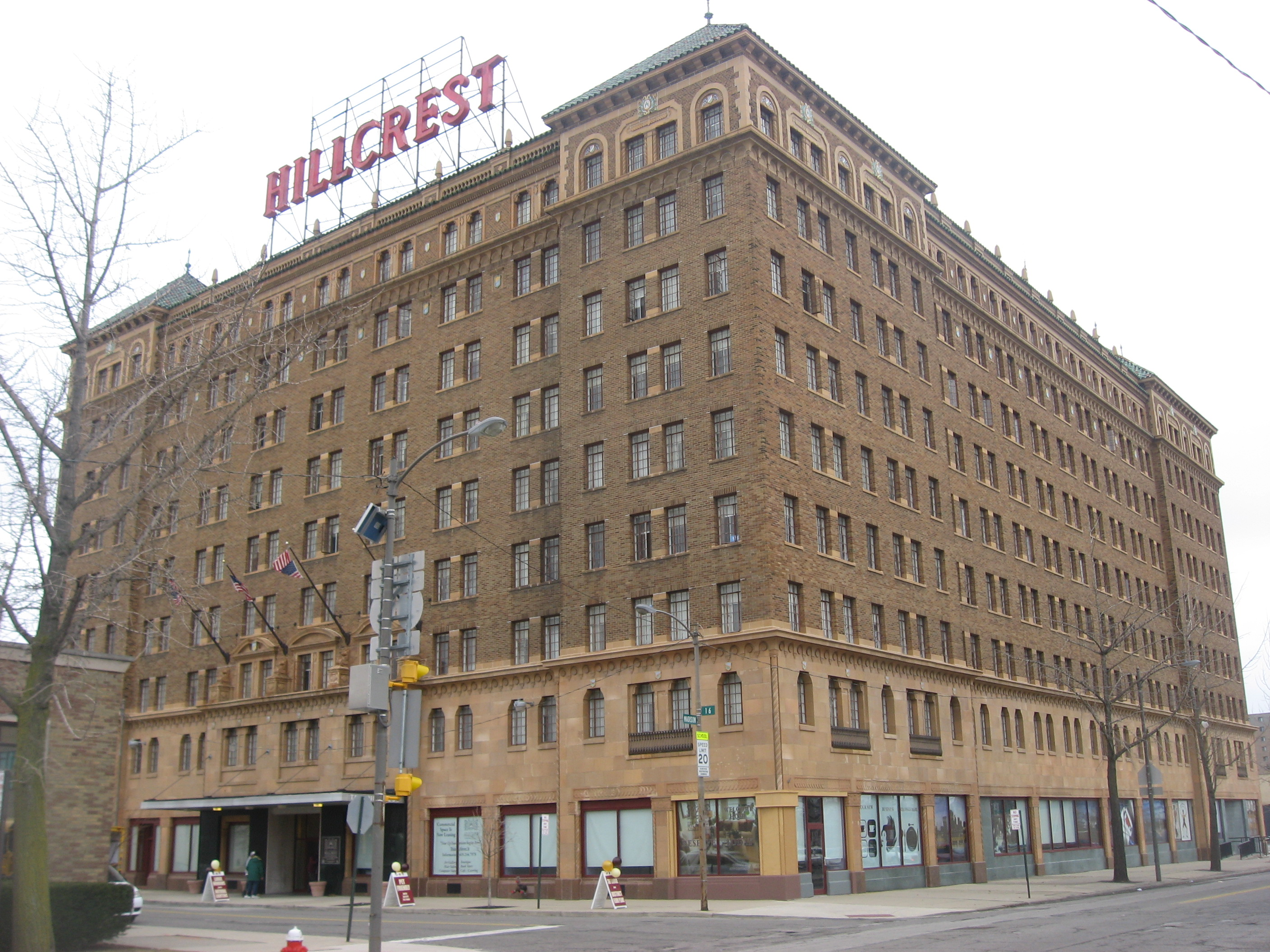
- Front and eastern side

- Location within Ohio Location within the United States
- Location: 1603 Madison Ave., Toledo, Ohio
- Coordinates: 41°39′19″N 83°32′50″W
- Area: less than one acre
- Built: 1929
- Architect: Alfred A. Hahn, H.J. Spieker & Company
- Architectural style: Mediterranean Revival
- NRHP reference No.: 98001179
- Added to NRHP: September 18, 1998

Hillcrest Hotel, also known as the Hillcrest Arms Apartment Hotel, is a historic building in Toledo, Ohio, United States. It has nine floors and was listed on the National Register of Historic Places in 1998. It is located at 1601-1621 Madison Avenue.

The Hillcrest was built in 1929. Authors, artists, and business people stayed in the hotel, including Amelia Earhart in 1933. She had an arrow painted on the roof to assist pilots in locating the local airfield.

The hotel closed in 1990. The building was used as an interdenominational Christian center to help homeless people and substance abusers before a 1994 fire closed it. A $12 million remodel in 1999 converted the building to use as a residential apartment building with 106 apartments. Bonds were issued for the building's renovation. The City of Toledo has made up the difference in loan underpayments and is expected to be "on the hook" for $6.7 million as the building was to be sold in foreclosure in 2009.
