= W. Willard Wirtz =

American politician (1912–2010)

Willard Wirtz
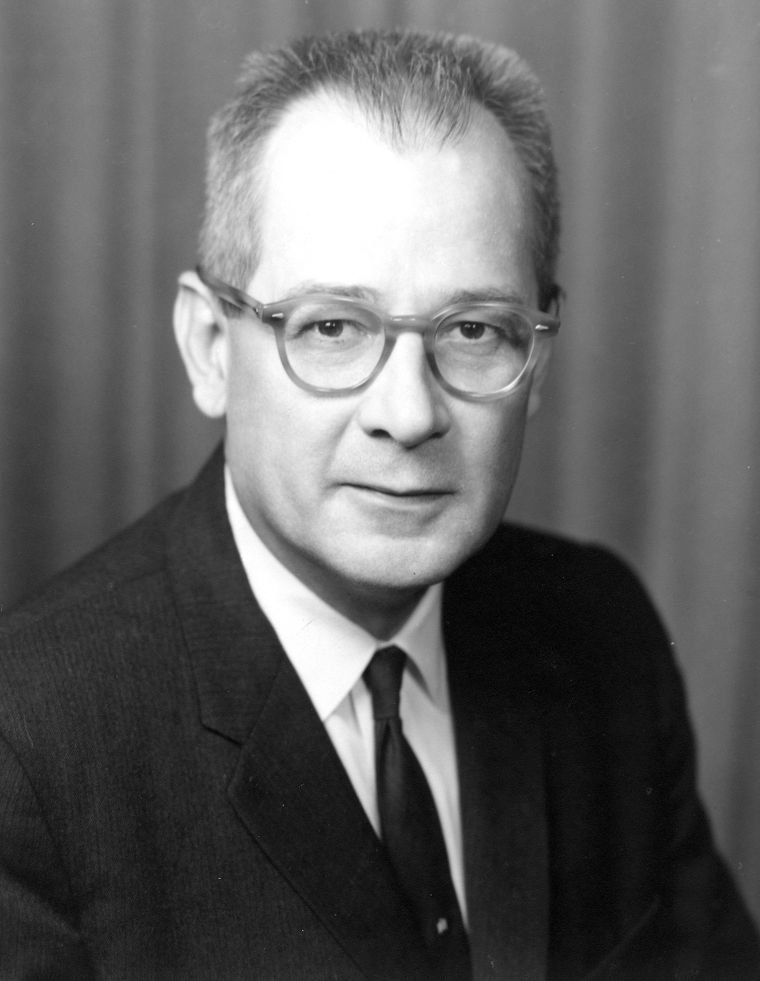

10th United States Secretary of Labor
- In office September 25, 1962 – January 20, 1969
- President: John F. Kennedy; Lyndon B. Johnson
- Preceded by: Arthur Goldberg
- Succeeded by: George Shultz

Personal details
- Born: William Willard Wirtz; March 14, 1912 DeKalb, Illinois, U.S.
- Died: April 24, 2010 (aged 98) Washington, D.C., U.S.
- Party: Democratic
- Spouse: Jane Quisenberry (m. 1936; died 2002)
- Children: 2
- Education: Beloit College (BA); Harvard University (LLB)

William Willard Wirtz (March 14, 1912 – April 24, 2010) was an American administrator, cabinet officer, attorney, and law professor. He served as the Secretary of Labor between 1962 and 1969 under the administrations of Presidents John F. Kennedy and Lyndon B. Johnson. Wirtz was the last living member of Kennedy's cabinet.

== Early life ==
Wirtz was born on March 14, 1912, in DeKalb, Illinois, the son of Alpha Belle (née White) and William Wilbur Wirtz. He attended Northern Illinois University, where he became a brother of Alpha Phi Omega. While a student at Beloit College, he met the former Mary Jane Quisenberry. They married in 1936. They had two sons, Richard and Philip Wirtz.

== Career ==
He graduated from Harvard Law School in 1937 and was immediately appointed to the faculty of the University of Iowa College of Law by the dean of the law school (and future U.S. Supreme Court justice) Wiley B. Rutledge. Wirtz was a professor of law at Northwestern University from 1939 to 1942. He served with the War Labor Board from 1943 to 1945, and was chairman of the National Wage Stabilization Board in 1946. Wirtz returned to teach law at Northwestern until 1954.

His students included future U.S. Supreme Court justice John Paul Stevens, whom Wirtz recommended for what became his 1947–48 clerkship with Justice Rutledge. He was active in Democratic politics and wrote speeches for Adlai Stevenson during his 1952 Presidential campaign. Wirtz was appointed by the Under-Secretary of Labor in 1961.

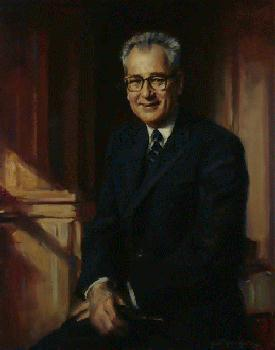
The official portrait of W. Willard Wirtz hangs in the Department of Labor

He held the post of Labor Secretary throughout the Kennedy and Johnson administrations, during which time he is credited for having dealt effectively with the various trade union strikes of the 1960s. One of his programs, meant to deal with a shortage of farmworkers after the end Bracero program in 1964 and a shortage of summer jobs for teenagers, was meant to replace the migrant workers with 17-year-old high school students. More than 18,000 were recruited for the A-TEAM, or Athletes in Temporary Employment as Agricultural Manpower, but only 3,300 ever worked in the fields, and many of them quickly quit or staged strikes because of the poor working conditions, including oppressive heat and decrepit housing. The program was cancelled after the first summer.

While serving in the Labor Department, Wirtz developed programs for the Johnson administration's War on Poverty. He advocated for remedial education for school dropouts and for retraining programs for unemployed workers. Wirtz's relationship with Johnson was compromised by Wirtz sending a private memorandum to the President expressing concerns about the United States' involvement in the Vietnam War.

== Later life ==
Following his public service, Wirtz was a partner in the law firms Wirtz & Gentry (1970–78), Wirtz & Lapointe (1979–[?]), and Friedman & Wirtz (1984–1989). In 1980, he served as the first Wayne Morse Chair of Law and Politics, established in honor of the late former Senator, at the University of Oregon.

Named in 2000, the Wirtz Labor Library is the main library of the U.S. Department of Labor in the Frances Perkins Building in Washington, D.C. The library contains 181,000 items, including the James Taylor collection (labor history), the Folio collection (trade union serials) and a 30,000 volume labor law collection. Wirtz wrote a memoir entitled "In the Rear View Mirror" which was published in 2008 by The Beloit College Press.

== Personal life and death ==
Wirtz was married to Mary Jane Quisenberry (1913-2002) with whom he had 2 children. He died in an assisted living facility in Washington, D.C., on April 24, 2010. At the time of his death he was the oldest living former cabinet member and the last surviving cabinet member of the Kennedy administration.

Political offices
Preceded by Arthur J. Goldberg	U.S. Secretary of Labor; Served under: John F. Kennedy, Lyndon B. Johnson; September 25, 1962 – January 20, 1969	Succeeded by George P. Shultz
