= East Side Freedom Library =

Library in Saint Paul, Minnesota, U.S.

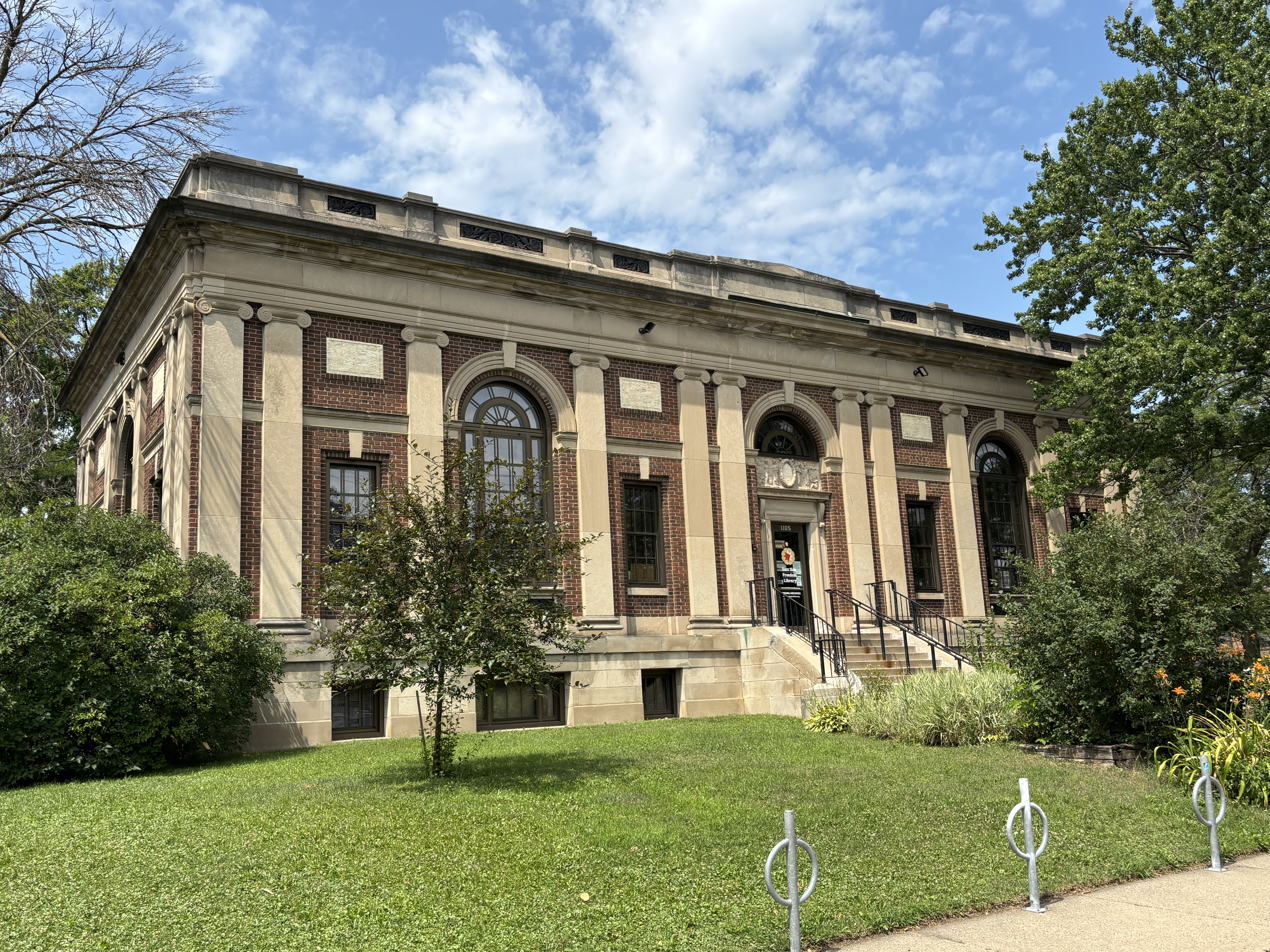
- Exterior of the library
- 44°58′28″N 93°04′17″W
- Location: 1105 Greenbrier Street, Saint Paul, Minnesota, U.S.
- Established: 2013
- Architect: Charles A. Hausler

The East Side Freedom Library is an independent, non-profit library in the East Side neighborhood of Saint Paul, Minnesota, United States. Founded in 2013 by Beth Cleary and Peter Rachleff, it has occupied the Arlington Hills Carnegie library building since leasing it from the city of Saint Paul in 2014. The building is located in the Payne-Phalen neighborhood which is known for being a working-class neighborhood with a large immigrant population. The library's collections and programming focus on the labor history and diverse immigrant communities of the neighborhood. Topics also include feminist history, African-American history and Native American history.

In summer of 2022, the East Side Freedom Library's board of directors hired ethnographer and community advocate Saengmany Ratsabout as the library's first paid full-time executive director.

== Collections and programs ==
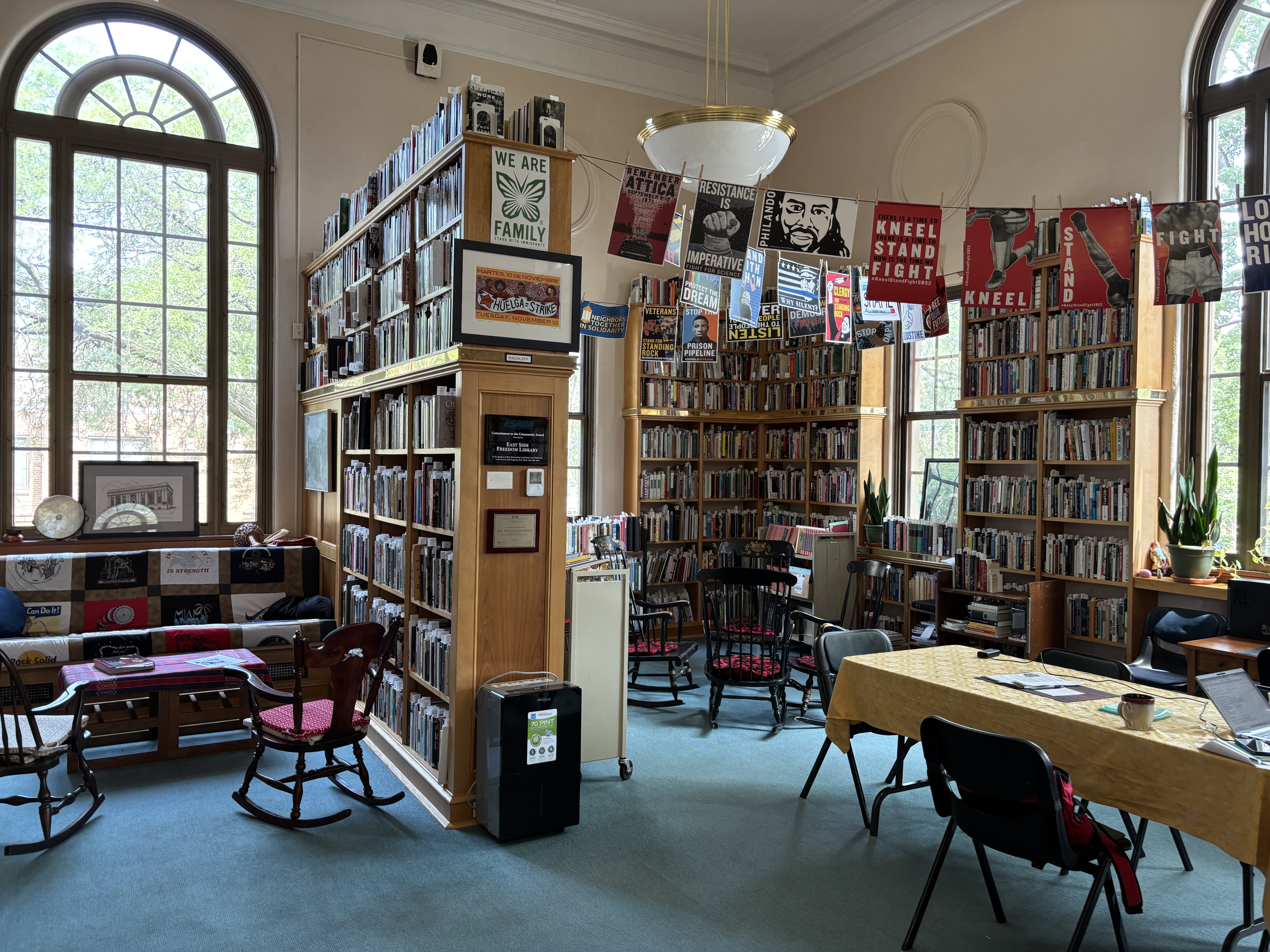
Interior

The mission of the East Side Freedom Library is "to mobilize community knowledge for solidarity, advocate for justice and work toward equity for all". The library's resources and activities serve to provide historical context for the communities of Saint Paul's East Side neighborhood, create connections among them, and encourage celebration of the area's diverse cultures. Events held at the library include workshops, presentations on regional history, and tutoring as well as meetings of clubs and unions. The library also functions as a cultural center, showcasing musical performances, readings, art exhibits, movies, puppet shows, and book clubs.

The library's non-circulating collection of over 35,000 books and other items focuses on the regional histories of labor, African-Americans, immigration, and social movements. The collections have been developed primarily from donations from the personal libraries of a number of scholars, including co-founder Rachleff.

Since 2015, the library has also housed the Hmong Archive. This archive was established in 1999 by Marlin L. Heise, Yuepheng L. Xiong, Tzianeng Vang, and others, and is one of the largest collections of books, documents, and material objects related to Hmong culture and history. It functions as an important resource to the large Hmong community in Minnesota, as well as to educators.

== Murals ==
The East Side Freedom Library features murals by Hmong-American artist Ger (Jackie) Yang. Funded by a Knight Foundation grant, these commissioned murals depict many of the peoples and immigrant groups who have lived in the East Side of Saint Paul, including the Dakota, Hmong, and Karen peoples, African-Americans, and immigrants from Mexico and Europe. Another mural represents the history of labor movements in Saint Paul.

== Awards ==
In 2017, the East Side Freedom Library was awarded the John Sessions Memorial Award by the Reference and User Services Association division of the American Library Association. The award is given to libraries for accomplishments in highlighting the contributions of the labor movement in the United States.

The Metropolitan Regional Arts Council awarded the library its Arts Achievement Award in 2017 for commitment to arts in the region.
