= Toledo Lucas County Public Library =

Public library system in Ohio, U.S.

Coordinates: 41°39′16″N 83°32′23″W

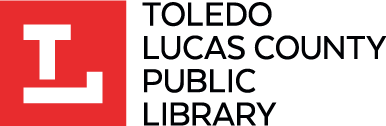

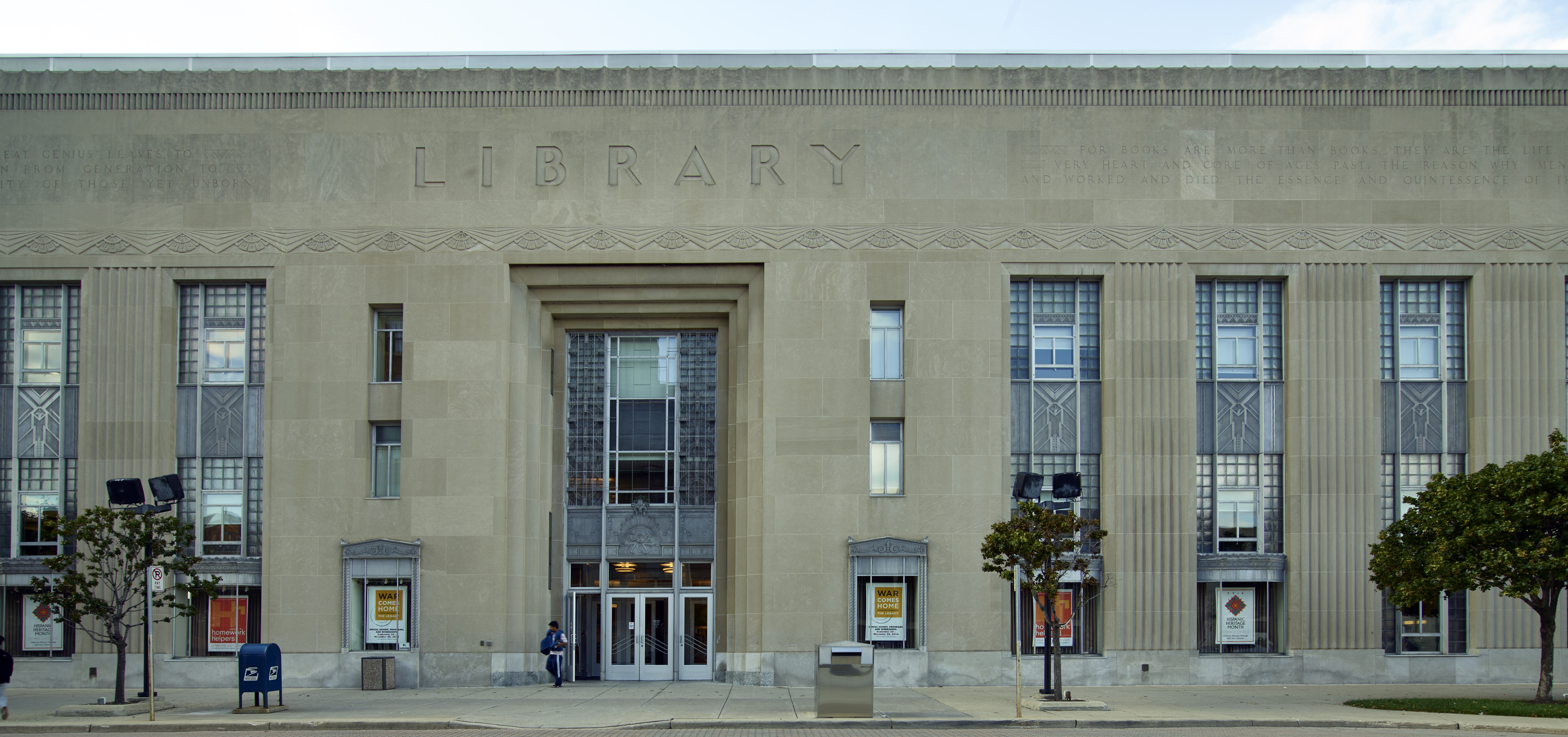
- The Main Library in Downtown Toledo
- Location: 325 N Michigan St, Toledo, Ohio 43604, United States
- Type: Public library
- Established: 1838
- Branches: Main Library and 20 branches

Access and use
- Circulation: 5,882,026
- Population served: 428,505
- Members: 281,996

Other information
- Budget: $3,680,250
- Director: Jason Kucsma
- Employees: 394
- Website: toledolibrary.org

The Toledo Lucas County Public Library (TLCPL) is the public library system serving Toledo, Ohio and its surroundings in Lucas County, Ohio, U.S. The TLCPL system includes the Main Library in downtown Toledo and 20 branches across the city of Toledo and the Toledo metropolitan area. The Toledo Public Library was founded in 1838, and the current TLCPL was formed in 1970 from the merger of the Toledo, Sylvania, and Lucas County library systems.

== History ==
The Toledo Lucas County Public Library is a winner of the National Medal for Museum and Library Service. This is the highest honor that can be awarded to a library system or museum in the United States. The award recognizes TLCPL’s exceptional commitment to serving as the go-to community connector for the makers, doers, and dreamers who are committed to the region’s success.

Founded in December 1838, it was Ohio's first public library created with tax money. There were 66 charter members in the association's subscription library. Members paid an annual fee of two dollars. The Ohio General Assembly granted a charter to the Young Men's Association of Toledo for a "lyceum and public library." In 1864, Republican members broke off from the Young Men's Association Library and formed the Toledo Library Association. The librarian was Thomas Blackwell. In 1867, the two groups merged. In 1873, a free public library was organized by an act of the Ohio Legislature. On May 26, the city council passed a resolution creating the Toledo Public Library. Mrs. Anna B. Carpenter was selected as the first librarian of the Toledo Public Library. On November 3, 1873, the Toledo Public Library opened for its first day of operation on the second floor of the King Block, a commercial building on the northeast corner of Madison Avenue and Summit Street.

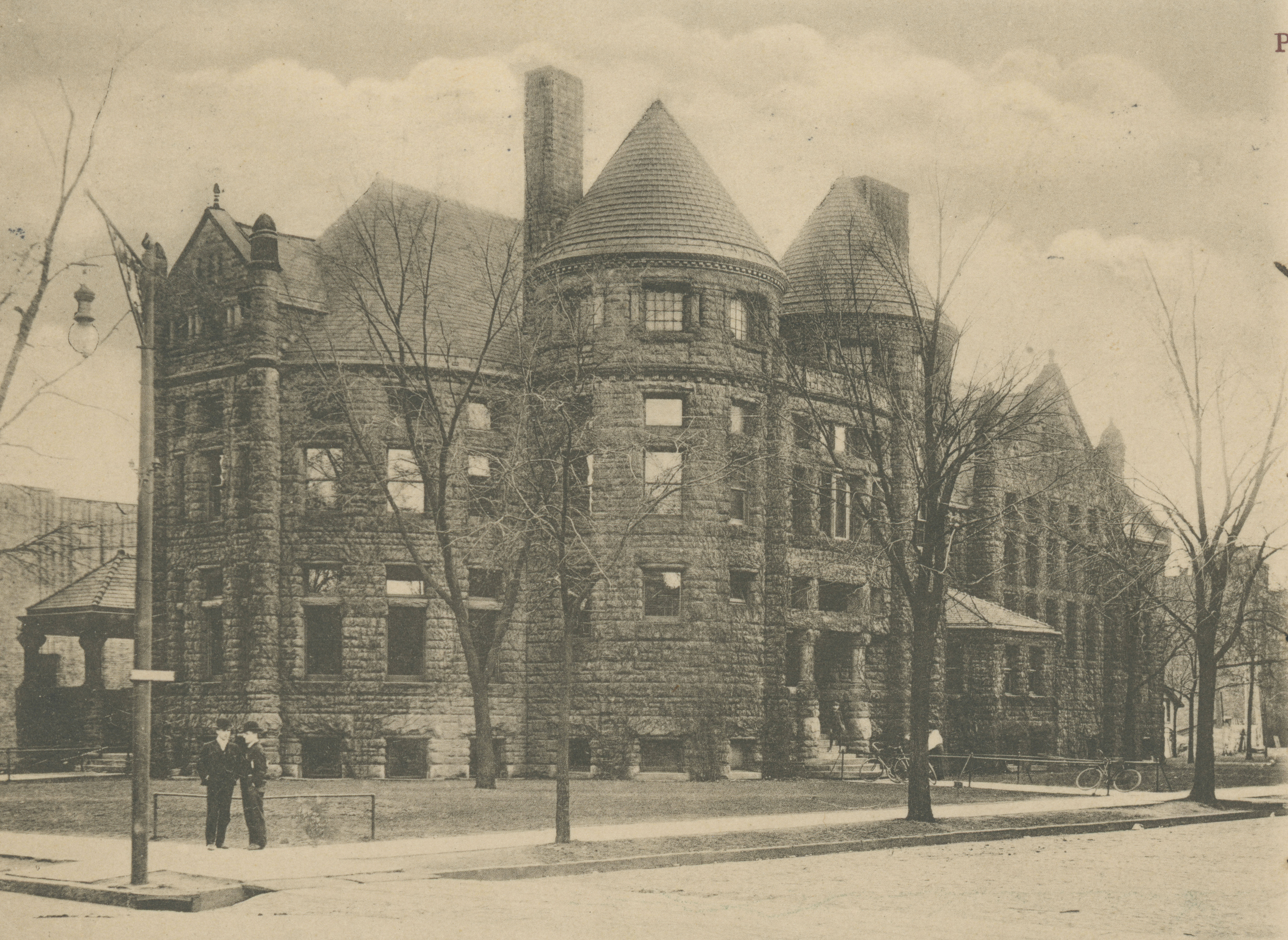
The 1890–1940 Main Library in Downtown Toledo

In 1875, Miss Lucy Stevens succeeded Mrs. Carpenter as librarian. In 1884, Stevens retired and was replaced by Mrs. Frances Jermain. In 1890, Edward O. Fallis designed a new main library to be built on the corner of Madison and Ontario in early Norman and Byzantine style. The final cost, including land, construction and some furniture, was $84,793. It opened on June 23, 1890. An addition was built in 1914. In 1902, Jermain retired and was replaced by Willis Fuller Sewall. He left in 1914 and was replaced by Herbert S. Hirschberg.

An annex to the main library building saw construction begin in September of 1914, with the grand opening on October 21, 1915.

The first full-service branch library opened in April 1915 and was at the Glenwood School. It closed with the opening of the Eliza M. Kent Branch in 1917. Other branch libraries located in schools during the 1920s included Navarre, Nathan Hale, Oakdale-White, Hamilton, McKinley, Arlington, and Harvard schools.

In 1916, the Andrew Carnegie Fund offered $125,000 to build five branches on sites to be provided by city. Consulting architect for all five buildings was Edward Tilton of New York. The five branches were the David R. Locke Branch, designed by M.M. Stophlet, and opened on December 5, 1917; the Eliza M. Kent Branch, designed by L.G. Welker, and opened on December 11, 1917 (fire destroyed the original building in 1974); the Anna C. Mott Branch, designed by Bernhard Becker, and opened on January 3, 1918; the Frances D. Jermain Branch, designed by Bates and Gamble, and opened on January 7, 1918; and the South Branch, designed by David L. Stine and Son, opened on January 16, 1918.

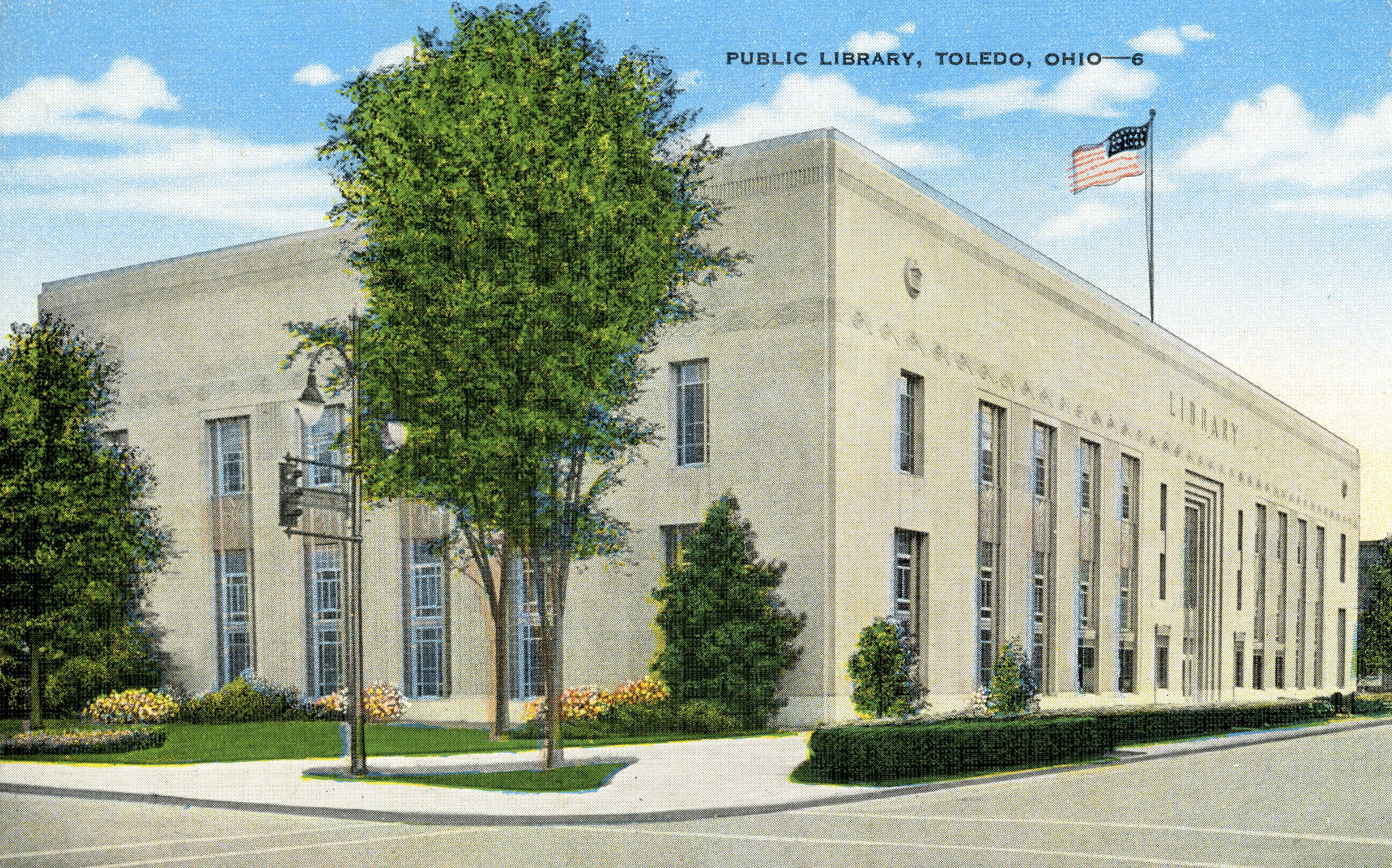
1940s postcard of the Main Library

In 1923, Carl Vitz took over as librarian. He was succeeded in 1937 by Russell Schunk, on whose watch the current Toledo Lucas County Main Library was built. It is on land that was the former home of the Toledo Central High School. The building was designed by the architectural firm of Hahn and Hayes and opened on September 5, 1940, as a Public Works Administration project. The interior of the building was modeled after the Enoch Pratt Free Library in Baltimore, Maryland. The exterior was modeled on that of Folger Shakespeare Library in Washington, D.C. One of the interesting features of the building are the vitrolite murals in the Clyde Scoles Historic Court and the Children's Library. The Local History and Genealogy Department was created when the new building opened.

On November 1, 1945, Herbert M. Sewell was named librarian, taking over for Mr. Vitz; 10 years later, he was succeeded by Robert D. Franklin who stayed as librarian until the merging of the three library systems.

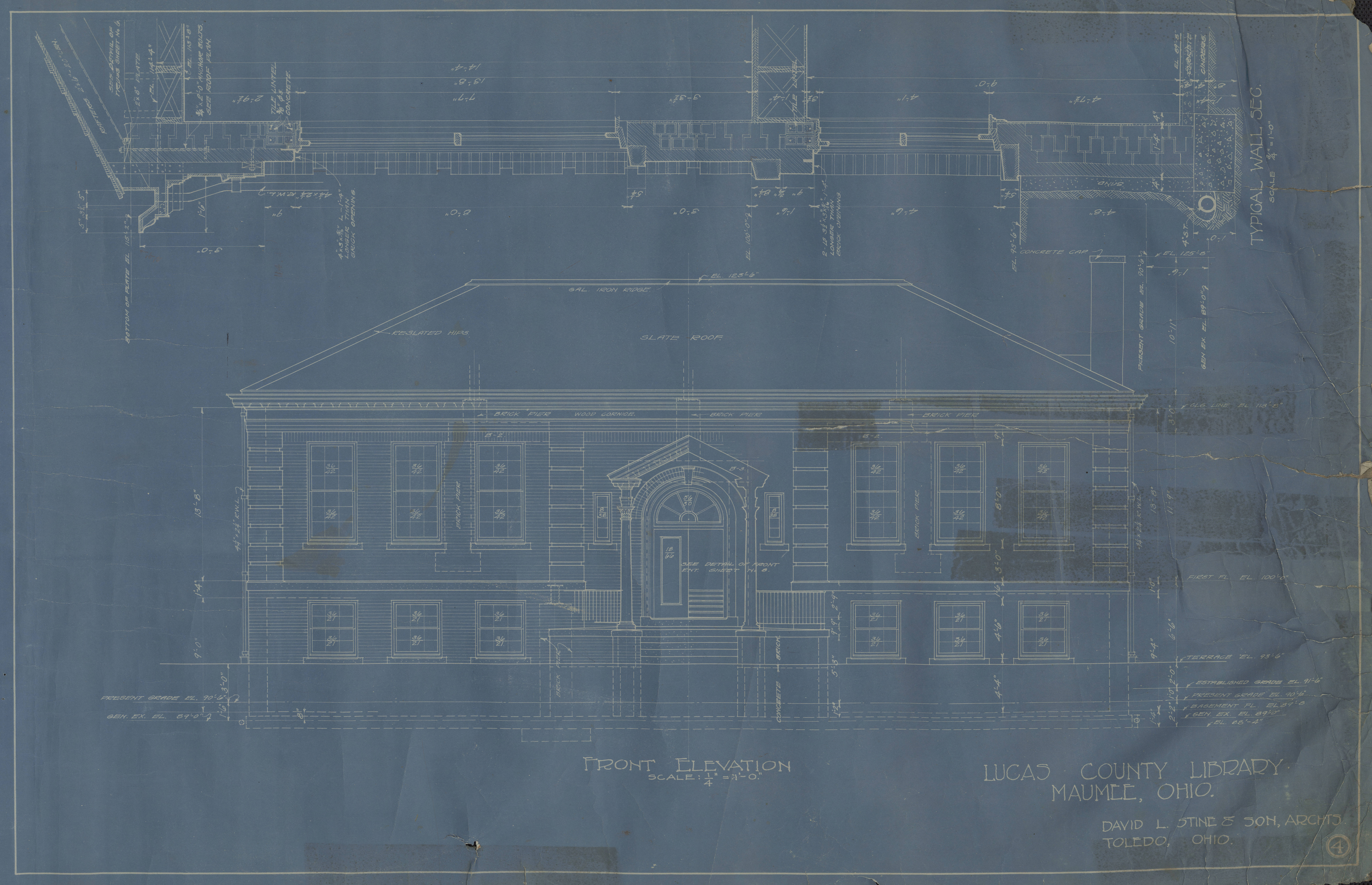
Original architectural drawing for the Lucas County Library in Maumee, now the Maumee Branch

The Lucas County Library opened in 1918 at the location that is now known as the Maumee Branch of the Toledo Lucas County Public Library system. Emilie Meuser was the first director of the Lucas County Library. She was replaced by Dorothy Strouse, who served in that role from 1929 to 1970, when the library systems merged. In 1937 the Lucas County Library system expanded to include bookmobile service for the first time in the county.

The Sylvania Public Library was established as a separate entity from the Lucas County Library in 1926 with Amy M. Ramsey as director. Marie Huff replaced her in 1931 and served as director until 1943, when Lillian Miller Carroll took over. Janet Boucher became director in 1950 and was replaced in 1956 by Helen Consear, who served until the systems merged. The current system was created in 1970 by the merger of the Toledo Public, Lucas County (established in 1918), and Sylvania Public (established in 1927) libraries. Lewis Naylor was named director of the combined libraries. Ardath Danforth was named to replace him in 1977. She would leave in 1985, replaced that same year by Clyde Scoles. In 2019 Jason Kucsma became the current executive director.

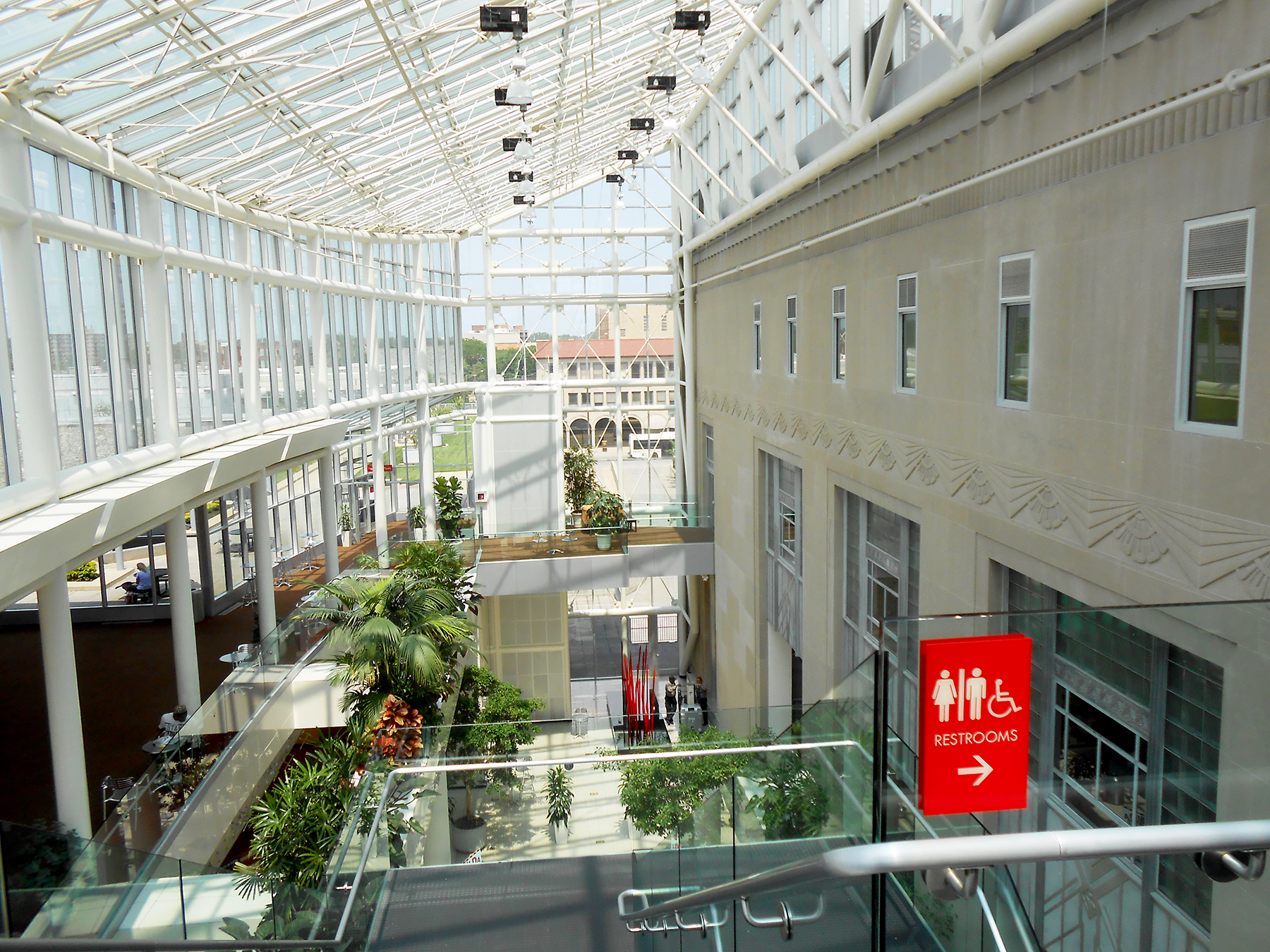
Interior of the expanded Main Library

With passage of the 1995 levy plans began for the renovation and expansion of the Main Library. The plan was to restore the historic and add 100,000 square feet (9,300 m^{2}) to the Art Deco facility. The architectural firm of Munger Munger + Associates Architects, Inc. designed the expansion and renovation of the building. On February 18, 1998, plans for the renovation and expansion were presented to the public, with the official ground-breaking taking place on March 8, 1998. During the project the library was able to stay open, with some temporary modifications to service points, except for the time it took to move the print and audio materials and furnishings to their new locations. The renovated and expanded Main Library reopened in August 2001.

Opened in fall 2016, King Road is the newest Library branch and was built to serve the growing Sylvania and Holland communities. It also houses the library's Mobile Services Department.

To better serve the community, a new modern 21st century Mott Branch at Smith Park was built directly across the street of its previous location. It is adjacent to the Martin Luther King Jr. elementary school. The new branch opened in June 2019.

The Main Library closed for renovations in September 2018, and was reopened to the public on September 28, 2019. The renovations moved the café; expanded the children's library; and added a gift shop, recording studio, and teaching and community spaces.

== Collection ==
Toledo Lucas County Public Library (TLCPL) serves all of Lucas County, which has a population of roughly 426,000. Customers frequently use the discussion groups, meeting rooms, and 170 free Internet-connected computers.

TLCPL contains reference materials, including books, DVDs, and CDs. It also contains special collections such as photographs, artwork, genealogical and local history resource materials, periodicals, family histories, and obituary index to The Blade newspaper, court records, and archives from The Blade. The Library is also a Federal Depository Library and a Patent-Trademark Depository Library.

The library also has many databases available for the public to use such as Ancestry, Consumer Reports, Gale Legal Forms, Medline, and many more.

=== Digital collections ===
- Digital collections: In 2013, TLCPL shared a grant of nearly $1 million with the public libraries of Cleveland, Cincinnati and Columbus, funded by the Ohio Public Library Information Network (OPLIN) and the Library Services Technology Act (LSTA). The grant allowed the libraries to open hubs to digitize documents, photographs, and the like for local organizations and individuals.
- eMedia: The library offers Libby, Hoopla, Freegal, Flipster, and many more types of media.

== Special collections ==
The library has five signature collections.

- The Art Tatum African American Resource Center was established in December 1989 and holds nearly 4,000 printed and documentary sources on Black history and culture. It is housed at the Kent Branch and named for Toledo-born jazz pianist Art Tatum.
- The Jennifer Fisher Nancy Drew Collection consists of books and memorabilia related to Nancy Drew.
- The Robert L. and Posy Huebner Collection began with 13 original illustrations and has grown to more than 240 works by children's book illustrators, displayed at the Main Library and its branches.
- The Local History Digital Collections is a digital archive of materials on the region's history.
- The Steinem Sisters Collection began as a lending library at the feminist bookstore People Called Women and moved to the Main Library in 2018. It has grown to nearly 1,500 titles.

== Special programs ==
The Library hosts more than 1,200 programs each month for all ages across all 20 locations, the full calendar can be viewed on the website.

- Authors!
- Summer Read
- Winter Read
- Live performances
- Literary Conventions
  - Comic-Con
  - Romance-Con
  - Nancy Drew Anniversary Celebration

== Locations ==
The Main Library is located at 325 North Michigan Street in downtown Toledo. Its departments include Computers & Media, Children's Library, Fact & Fiction, Local History & Genealogy, and the Teen Department & Studio Lab. The Children's Library at Main Library houses a creativity lab, the Susan M. Savage Family Place.

The Main Library also houses the award-winning Rogowski-Kaptur Labor History Room. Named for Congresswoman Marcy Kaptur's mother, this room won the John Sessions Memorial Award from the American Library Association in 2014. The library has The Blade Rare Book Room & Vault featuring rare and valuable items such as a letter from Thomas Jefferson dated 1800 and first editions of the original Nancy Drew series, written by local newspaper columnist and author, Mildred Wirt Benson. Both of these rooms are located in the Local History and Genealogy Department.

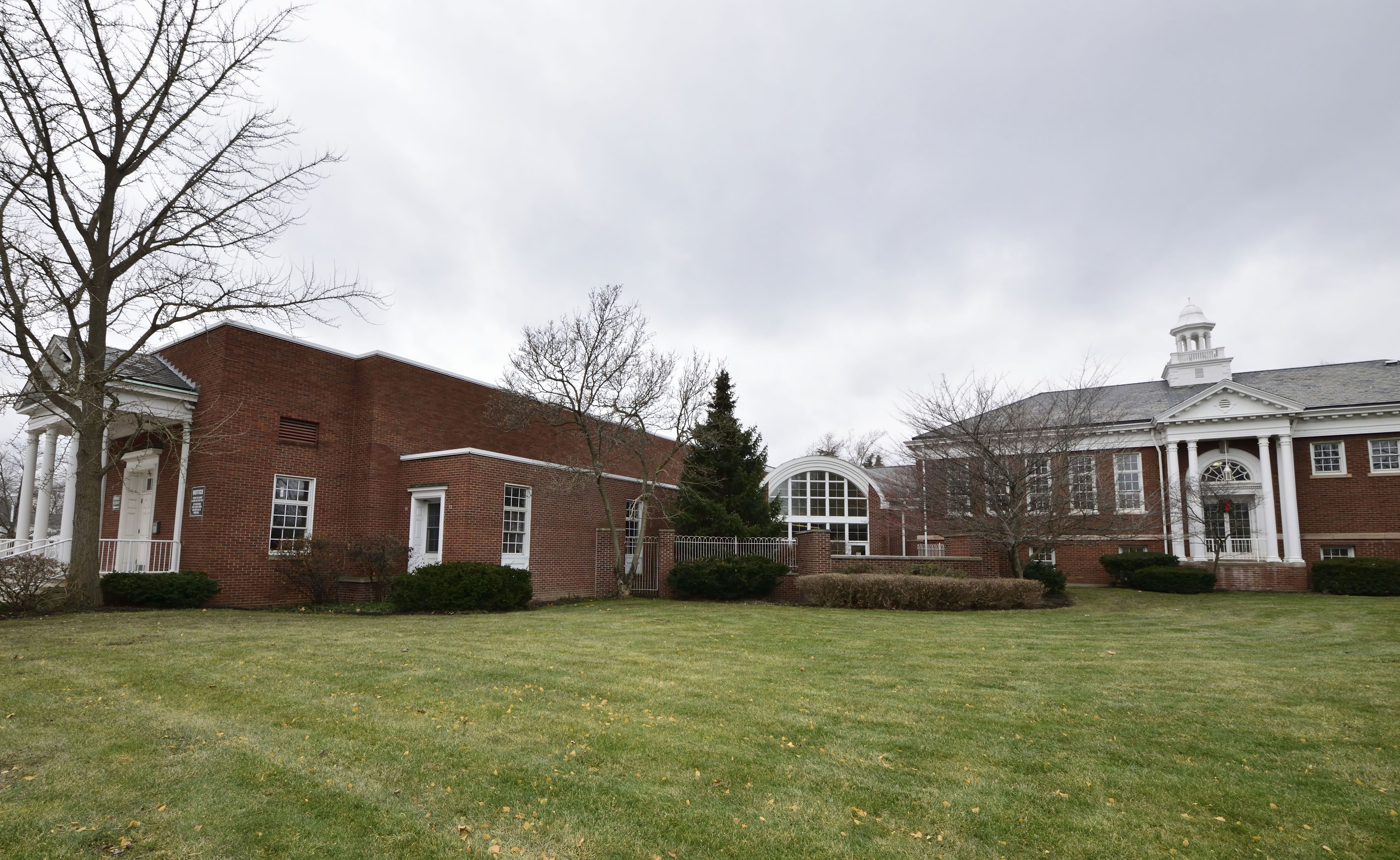
The Maumee Branch opened in 1918

The library system currently has 20 branches and four Mobile Services vehicles. The locations besides Main Library are the Birmingham Branch (opened in 1920), Heatherdowns Branch (opened 1968), Holland Branch (opened 1984), Kent Branch (opened 1917; also houses the Art Tatum African-American Resource Center), King Road Branch (opened 2016), Lagrange Branch (opened 1934), Locke Branch (opened in 1917), Maumee Branch (former location of the Lucas County Library which opened in 1937), Mott Branch (opened 1918), Oregon Branch (opened 1965), Mobile Services, Point Place Branch (opened 1938), Reynolds Corners Branch (opened 1958), Sanger Branch (opened 1950), South Branch (opened in 1918), Sylvania Branch (opened at its original location in 1926, opened at its current location in 1958, while still a separate entity from the Toledo Public and Lucas County libraries), Toledo Heights Branch (opened 1935), Washington Branch (opened 1928), Waterville Branch (opened 1964), and West Toledo Branch (opened 1923).

Mobile Services is Toledo Library’s library-on-wheels that serves local neighborhoods, shopping centers, and other community locations.
