= Mahoney v. Sailors' Union of the Pacific =

Union discrimination lawsuit

Mahoney v. Sailors' Union of the Pacific (colloquially known as the Mahoney Beef) was a 1954 decision by the Washington State Supreme Court that ordered the reinstatement of John Mahoney and his supporters who had been unfairly expelled from the Sailors' Union of the Pacific. Known colloquially as the "Mahoney Beef," the case has been cited by scholars as an example of the relationship between state laws and union membership rights.

== Background ==
John A. Mahoney was a sailor from Seattle and member of the Sailors' Union of the Pacific (SUP) known for having militant politics and challenging the craft-unionist positions of the SUP leadership. In 1949, Mahoney and a group of other militant sailors refused to cross a Canadian Seamen's Union picket line. The SUP leadership viewed the Canadian Seamen's Union as communist-dominated and sought to rid the influence of communism within the SUP. A trial was called at the union headquarters in San Francisco, and Mahoney was expelled for disobedience. Mahoney sued the union for his reinstatement and payment in back wages and damages.

Mahoney received support from many rank-and-file sailors, especially in Seattle, who believed that his trial had been unfair and his expulsion was politically motivated. His supporters established the Mahoney Defense Committee to raise money for his lawsuit. Dozens of other members were expelled from the SUP for their support of Mahoney, including Shaun Maloney, and launched their own lawsuits for reinstatement.

== Ruling ==
In 1954, the Washington Supreme Court ruled in Mahoney's favor and ordered his reinstatement and the payment of damages. The court rejected his claim for back wages, however, on the grounds that it was within the National Labor Relations Board's jurisdiction to award payments for unfair labor practices. Maloney and the other expelled sailors also won reinstatement.

== Aftermath ==
Though they won reinstatement, the majority of Mahoney's supporters who rejoined the SUP were expelled again shortly thereafter. Many of the plaintiffs, including Maloney, never returned to sailing and instead found jobs working as longshore workers in the International Longshore and Warehouse Union, which was much friendlier to left-wing politics. The Mahoney Beef is viewed by labor historians as an example within larger McCarthy-era trend of anti-communist purging in unions.
