= Ross Rieder =

American historian and activist

- Born: 1940; Yakima, Washington, U.S.
- Died: December 14, 2021 (aged 80–81)
- Organization: Pacific Northwest Labor History Association
- Known for: Labor activism

Ross Rieder was a labor activist and historian from Washington state and founder of the Pacific Northwest Labor History Association.

== Biography ==
Ross K. Rieder was born in 1940 in Yakima, Washington, to Frances Rieder and Rolla Rieder, Sr. He spent his childhood in Yakima, Damascus, and San Jose. In 1962, he graduated from Linfield College with a degree in music education.

In 1962, Rieder began teaching music and eighth grade chorus at Evergreen Junior High School in Everett, Washington. He became involved in his union, the Everett Federation of Teachers (American Federation of Teachers, Local 722). He served as president of the Washington State Federation of Teachers from 1968-1975.

After his term as WSFT president, Rieder continued his career in the labor movement. From 1977 to 1979, he worked as a negotiator and organizer for the International Federation of Professional and Technical Engineers, Local 17, and he was Political Action Director at the Washington State Labor Council from 1979 to 1986. He worked as an organizer for the Snohomish County Labor Council from 1991 to 1997. Rieder was also involved in the production of numerous publications and media programs about the labor movement and its history.

In 1977, Rieder worked with Ottilie Markholt and a group of local labor activists and historians to establish the Pacific Northwest Labor History Association. Rieder was elected the PNLHA's first president, and he remained in that role until his retirement in 2015. As president, he produced the PNLHA's newsletter "Urban Work," led the PNLHA in sponsoring an annual labor stage at the Northwest Folklife Festival, oversaw annual conferences, produced the PNLHA's annual labor history calendar, and produced labor history walking tours in Seattle and Tacoma.

Rieder retired from the PNLHA in 2015. He died on December 14, 2021.

== See also ==
- Ottilie Markholt
- Ron Magden
