= Jerry Tyler =

American labor leader (1911–2009)

- Born: November 11, 1911; Shenandoah, Iowa
- Died: 2009 (aged 97–98); Everett, Washington
- Occupations: Marine Cook, Longshore Worker
- Known for: Host, Reports From Labor

Jerry Tyler was a longshore worker, labor activist, and radio personality from Seattle, best known for being the host of a popular radio show Reports From Labor, which ran from 1948 to 1950.

== Early life and career ==
Jerry Tyler was born in Shenandoah, Iowa, in 1911 to small farmers who struggled to make ends meet amidst rising prices. Tyler worked many odd jobs beginning at a young age and made his way to the West Coast during the Great Depression. His first stable employment was as a nightclub waiter in Modesto, California, and he became a member of Waiters Union, Local 30. Tyler briefly joined the California National Guard but left after refusing to take part in breaking the San Francisco General Strike in 1934.

During World War II, Tyler first became involved in maritime labor when he joined the Marine Cooks and Stewards of the Pacific (MCS), where he worked on US Navy ships for the duration of the war. The MCS was a left-wing union that was racially integrated and more democratic than other unions at the time, which had a profound influence on Tyler. He also joined the Communist Party during the war, but he left in the mid-1950s.

After the war, Tyler remained in the MCS and moved to Seattle with his pregnant wife. In 1946, he became the vice president of the Seattle Industrial Trade Union Council, a central labor council for CIO affiliated unions, and vice-chairman of the Northwest Committee for Maritime Unity.

== Reports From Labor radio broadcast ==
In 1948, when Harry Truman attempted to block the MCS and other waterfront unions from striking, Tyler was selected by the union to host a biweekly radio broadcast to drum up public support for the struggle. This proved effective during the Longshore Strike of 1948, and after the strike Tyler helped coordinate with other unions to make a regular broadcast program Reports From Labor. The show became a key tool for workers from local unions to coordinate with each other and gain public support for strikes. The show promoted a progressive social commentary, including on issues like civil rights and unemployment. The show was cancelled, however, in 1950 amidst the Red Scare after the ILWU, MCS, and nine other unions were expelled from the CIO due to alleged communist infiltration.

== Longshore career ==
Tyler worked part-time as a longshore worker through ILWU, local 19, while hosting Reports From Labor. After the broadcast was cancelled, he became an organizer for the ILWU, and by the late 1950s, he was a full-time longshore worker and regular member of Local 19. During the mid-1950s, Tyler left the Communist Party due to political disagreements and concerns over the lack of internal democracy within the party. In 1954, he was called before the House Unamerican Activities Commission, where he remained mostly silent.

In the 1960s, Tyler was elected multiple times as vice president of Local 19. He also became an editor of the Local 19 newsletter The Hook and later helped establish the Local 19 Pensioners Association newsletter The Rusty Hook. Tyler retired in 1974. He moved to Everett in the 1990s, where he lived until his death in 2009.
