= Payne-Phalen, Saint Paul =

Neighbourhood in Saint Paul, Minnesota

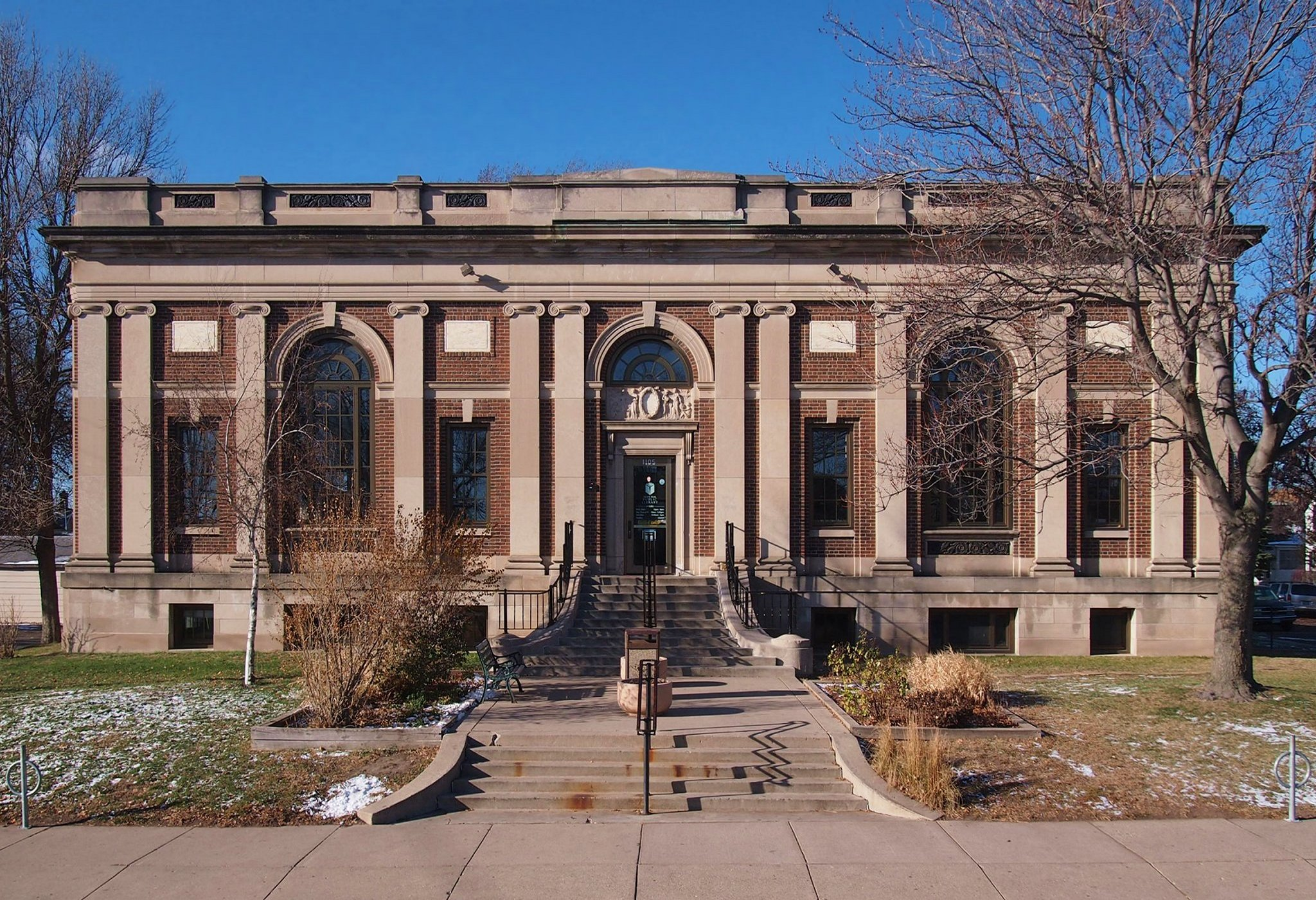
The former Arlington Hills Library, now known as the East Side Freedom Library.

Payne-Phalen is a neighborhood and city planning district in Saint Paul, Minnesota in the United States. It is Planning District 5. The area includes several smaller neighborhoods, namely Railroad Island, Phalen Park, Rivoli Bluff, Vento, Wheelock Park, and Williams Hill. It ranges from a blue-collar area to the south to a middle-class area north of Maryland Avenue, including upscale real estate around Lake Phalen. The neighborhood is part of the larger area known as the East Side of Saint Paul. Major streets in the neighborhood include E. 7th St, Phalen Boulevard, Arcade Street, which hosts U.S. Route 61 and Payne Avenue. Payne Avenue has been a major commercial corridor for the east side of Saint Paul since the 1930s.

Historically, the neighborhood has hosted many immigrant groups. Almost 30% of residents were born in another country in 2020 with a majority of residents being Asian. As recent as 1980, almost 95% of residents were white but by 2020 that number had dropped to about 30%.

The neighborhood is home to LEAP High School, which focuses on education for English language learners and immigrants, and Johnson Senior High School.

The neighborhood and nearby neighborhoods used to have major manufacturing employment with Hamm's Brewery, 3M, and Whirlpool Corporation being major employers. Those three major employers as well as several others left the neighborhood in the 1980s to 2000s. For a time, the neighborhood struggled to retain businesses, and in the 2010s had a reputation for crime and gang activity. Since the 2020s the neighborhood has focused on arts and received increased levels of government and non-profit guided investment.

== Culture ==
=== Luther Seminary (1893 - 1932) ===
Beginning in 1893, Luther Seminary of the German-speaking Evangelical Lutheran Joint Synod of Ohio moved from Afton, Minnesota, to Phalen Park. Luther Seminary enabled German immigrant pastors to attain bachelor of arts degrees and master classical and biblical languages by teaching them in German. Initially, during the Panic of 1893, construction costs skyrocketed and banks refused to finance the building. However, administrators raised funds to open the seminary. Students were all men and lived in a single building that included a dormitory, classrooms, a library, offices, and dining facilities. Students paid into a mutual aid "boarding club" to purchase food collectively. Seminary students also participated in publishing the school yearbook and the school newspaper, sports, English, and German, and musical clubs, and often volunteered at local Lutheran churches.

By 1911, the seminary had expanded by 10 acres (4.0 ha) and raised $30,000 to finance a new auditorium and lecture hall. During World War I, anti-German and xenophobic sentiment grew in Saint Paul, leading German-language enrollment at the seminary to dwindle. In the 1920s, additional dormitories were also built, and the seminary developed a junior college, a conservatory, and a religious and philosophy seminar for bachelor of science degrees. In 1927, it became coeducational, integrating women students. The seminary was active in establishing Ohio Synod churches throughout the Midwest until the synod merged into the American Lutheran Church in 1930. Due to financial issues from the Great Depression, the program in Saint Paul was closed and transferred to Wartburg Theological Seminary in Dubuque, Iowa. The seminary program and college funds were also transferred later to Wartburg College in Waverly, Iowa.
