= Phil Lelli =

American activist (1929–2004)

- Born: December 4, 1929; Edgewood, Washington, U.S.
- Died: April 25, 2004 (aged 74); Puyallup, Washington, U.S.
- Occupation: Longshore worker
- Organization: ILWU

Phillip (Phil) Lelli was a longshore worker, union activist, and philanthropist from Tacoma, Washington. Lelli was president of ILWU, local 23, for four nonconsecutive terms between 1966 and 1985.

== Biography ==
Phil Lelli was born in Edgewood, Washington, outside of Tacoma, in 1929. His parents were children of German and Italian immigrants and his father owned a small grocery store. Lelli graduated from high school and began working on the waterfront in 1955 unloading bales of wheat. In 1961, he began working in a gear locker.

During the mid-twentieth century, Tacoma had become home to many anarchists, syndicalists, and old IWW members. Unlike most other ports on the West Coast, Tacoma longshore workers did not affiliate with the newly formed ILWU in 1937 and instead remained part of the craft-unionist AFL. Many workers distrusted Harry Bridges and the CIO and wished to maintain the union's independence. After not being permitted to travel to nearby ports for extra work, however, in early 1958, Tacoma longshore workers voted to join the ILWU. Lelli voted against this decision, wary of the union becoming dominated by a large centralized bureaucracy. Lelli later stated that his fears were largely unfounded and entering the ILWU was the correct decision.

Lelli was first elected president of Local 23 in 1966 and served until 1969. He later served three other terms as president from 1971 to 1975 and 1977–1986. During his time as president, Lelli worked closely with Local 23 business agent George Ginnis to modernize and attract commerce towards the Port of Tacoma. He also funded a project to write a book about the history of Local 23 through a grant from the Washington Commission for the Humanities. He retired in 1993.

In addition to his role in the ILWU, Lelli also took on other labor advocacy roles during his life. He served on the Washington state Advisory Council on International Trade and Development from 1983 to 1985 and was elected Tacoma port commissioner in 1992.

Lelli married B. Joann Williams and had five children, one of whom became a longshore worker and died in an accident on the waterfront in 1989. He died in 2004. In 2016, the Washington State Transportation Commission announced that a portion of State Route 509 leading into the Port of Tacoma would be named in honor of Lelli.

== See also ==
- Ottilie Markholt
- Shaun Maloney
