= Longshore strike 1948 =

The Longshore Strike 1948 was an industrial dispute which took place in 1948 on the west coast of the United States. President of the ILWU (International Longshore and Warehouse Unions) at the time was Harry Bridges. The WEA (waterfront employers association) led by Frank P. Foisie were in a conflict, they were unable to come to agreeable terms and with the issues of hiring and the politics of union leadership, longshoremen and marine unions performed a walk out on September 2, 1948.
The strike shut down the United States’ West Coast ports and put a dent in American labor history and a positive change for future longshoremen.

== Background ==
"The ILWU is about workers who built a union that is democratic, militant and dedicated to the idea that solidarity with other workers and other unions is the key to achieving economic security and a more peaceful world." In the sense that the workers wanted to achieve a better life for themselves and their families. The conditions of this job are unsafe and “on call”. The work of loading and unloading ships’ cargoes was, at times, very random and unscheduled.

The employers were demanding change in order to keep up with the demands of war effort. With the history of this type of work as well with their democratic point of view, conservative and hardworking, any negative changes are nearly impossible to make especially in a time of radical reformation.

The 1948 Seattle Pacific Longshore Strike was a conflict between the changes from the New Deal and the prestages of the Cold War. During World War II many divisions splitting up the ILWU began. WEA during the 1948 strike attempted to manipulate these sections, the outcome would then weaken the union's solidarity. With the outbreak of the war this put the ILWU in a strange position there was a pressure on the Union to increase production for the sake of the war effort. The demand for soldiers and the need for stability had a huge impact of the ILWU.

This was a ninety-five-day strike that stretched from San Diego to Alaska. The outburst of this strike emerged shortly after the Taft-Hartley Act. This was taking place during the time of The Red Scare. The 1948 strike secured the future for the ILWU, in the sense that it would survive the Cold War anti-labor persecutions that diminished most leftwing unions. With the two leaders unable to come to terms, the strike lasted more than three months during which “union members displayed an intensity of purpose and level of solidarity that defied the expectations of employers and many observers” With the stress of World War II and the Cold War, along with Conflict arising between WEA and ILWU led to the Longshoreman strike of 1948.

== Strike Timeline ==
The outbreak of this strike goes back to the start of “Fink Hall” an open shop hiring system, which originated in Seattle, under the leadership of Frank P. Foisie. This system changed the history of how a longshoreman found work, the employers were now in charge as to who gets hired and for how much. Many conflicts arose from this new type of hiring system such as bribes were initiated to obtain work. Many known union supporters were blacklisted and unable to get a job. This decreased the rotation work allowing those in favor to find work while others will go days and days without work and pay.

The objective of the 1948 strike was to illuminate the control of the employers, and to end favoritism, allow opportunity for all and continue to work in a secure position. The two building blocks that provide the strength for the ILWU's Longshore Division have always been the hiring hall and the coastwise contract. After the strike of 1937 the West Coast longshoremen won the coast contract. This new contract made many improvements in the working lives of many longshore men and their families, and the strength and solidarity necessary to improve wages and benefits for generations to come.

After the strike of 1934 the union gained major concessions from employers. The strike of 1948 was significant in the sense that it created the union control over the hiring hall, which would give workers job security and more control which allowed fairness for all.

This strike did not appear out of nowhere changes within the labor movement and a political shift gave leeway to the WEA to take a more aggressive approach against the hiring hall with the involvement of a radical leader of the ILWU.

The President at the time, Truman, initiated the Taft-Hartley Law to deprive the ILWU of all of its gains. This act “outlawed the hiring hall, preferential hiring for union members, secondary boycotts, and strikes over jurisdictional issues.” During the political shift the Republican Party began to win both the House of Representatives and the Senate. Their Republican- controlled Congress were the ones who passed this Act, this law made it harder for unions to form, thus changing the outlook of labor. This law was put in place because a strike was on the radar and was going to happen if Truman didn't take action. Unfortunately this Law was unsuccessful and the strike went on creating a “New look”. September was the specific time that the Longshoremen walked off the job on the Puget sound of Seattle. Bringing forth hostility and the rise of the strike

== Aftermath ==
The Strike of 1948 gave a “new look” to the longshoremen workers. One of the finest trade union agreements ever made was negotiated in the new atmosphere. The hiring hall continued as it was; wages were increased, union security was reaffirmed and improvements were made in the hours and vacations provisions. This was the last time the coast wise contract was challenged by employers.
