= Labor Archives of Washington =

Collection at the University of Washington Libraries

- Established: 2010

The Labor Archives of Washington is a special collection at the University of Washington Libraries dedicated to preserving documents from the labor movement in Washington state.

== Background ==
The Labor Archives were founded by Conor Casey in 2010 funded by a $250,000 fundraising campaign run by the Washington State Labor Council and a $150,000 matching grant from the International Longshore and Warehouse Union.

The Labor Archives won the John Sessions Memorial Award in 2013 and 2021. The 2021 award citation commended the Archives for its Oral History Project, “Working in the Time of COVID19,” that was a collaboration with unions, faculty, and regional labor history organizations.
