= List of Asian-American writers =

This is a list of Asian American writers, authors, and poets who have Wikipedia pages. Their works are considered part of Asian American literature.

== A–D ==
- Ai
- Shaila Abdullah
- Aria Aber
- George Abraham
- Jessica Abughattas
- Dilruba Ahmed, poet
- Maya Ajmera
- Karl Ichiro Akiya
- Meena Alexander
- Agha Shahid Ali
- Kazim Ali
- Noel Alumit
- Mia Alvar
- Hala Alyan
- Ryka Aoki
- Fatimah Asghar
- Aziz Ansari
- Gina Apostol
- Gaiutra Bahadur
- Shauna Singh Baldwin
- Peter Bacho, American Book Award winner for the novel Cebu
- Ravi Batra
- Cathy Bao Bean (包圭漪)
- Susham Bedi
- Tamiko Beyer
- Bette Bao Lord (包柏漪)
- Rick Barot
- Mei-mei Berssenbrugge (白萱华), poet
- Cecilia Manguerra Brainard
- Sujata Bhatt
- Jean Shinoda Bolen
- Jaswinder Bolina
- Jenny Boully
- Akemi Dawn Bowman
- Rowan Hisayo Buchanan
- Carlos Bulosan
- Regie Cabico
- Lan Cao
- Celso Al Carunungan
- Linda Ty Casper
- Gilbert Luis R. Centina III
- Steph Cha
- Theresa Hak Kyung Cha
- Jeffery Paul Chan (陈耀光)
- Rajiv Chandrasekaran
- Jay Chandrasekhar, screenwriter
- Diana Chang (張粲芳), novelist
- Eileen Chang (张爱玲)
- Iris Chang (張純如)
- Jennifer Chang
- K-Ming Chang
- Lan Samantha Chang
- Leonard Chang
- Tina Chang
- Lisa Changadveja
- Bonnie Chau
- Maneet Chauhan
- Daniyal Mueenuddin, author
- Cathy Linh Che
- Alexander Chee
- Traci Chee
- Anelise Chen
- Justina Chen
- Su Hua Ling Chen (凌叔华)
- Nien Cheng (郑念)
- Anna Chennault (陈香梅)
- King-Kok Cheung
- Cheng Sait Chia
- Fay Chiang
- Monlin Chiang (蒋梦麟)
- Ted Chiang, Hugo and Nebula Award winner
- Frank Chin (趙健秀)
- Justin Chin
- Marilyn Chin (陈美玲)
- Mei Chin
- Staceyann Chin
- Frank Ching
- Kah Kyung Cho, philosopher
- Khendum Choden
- Don Mee Choi
- Susan Choi
- Roshani Chokshi
- Deepak Chopra
- Louis Chu (雷霆超), author of Eat a Bowl of Tea (1961)
- Seo-Young Chu (주서영), author of "A Refuge for Jae-in Doe" and "I, Discomfort Woman"
- Wesley Chu (朱恆昱), science fiction writer
- Frank Chuman
- Frances Chung
- Philip W. Chung, playwright
- Peter Ho Davies
- Ghalib Shiraz Dhalla
- Chitra Banerjee Divakaruni
- Dinesh D'Souza, conservative journalist
- Tony D'Souza
- Bei Dao
- Sylvia Day
- Violet Kazue de Cristoforo
- Oliver de la Paz
- Margaret Dilloway, author of How To Be An American Housewife (2010)
- Chitra Banerjee Divakaruni

== E–J ==
- Fan Wu (吴帆)
- Nancy Yi Fan (范禕)
- Sui Sin Far (水仙花), a.k.a. Edith Maude Eaton
- Ben Fee (张恨棠/木云)
- Eilis Flynn
- Noriko Sawada Bridges Flynn
- Jamie Ford
- Eugie Foster, Nebula Award winner
- Sesshu Foster
- Gyo Fujikawa
- Jun Fujita
- Michiyo Fukaya
- Francis Fukuyama
- Dale Furutani
- M. Evelina Galang
- Sarah Gambito
- V.V. Ganeshananthan
- Anu Garg
- Atul Gawande
- Tess Gerritsen
- Alex Gilvarry
- Anchee Min
- Zulfikar Ghose
- Khalil Gibran
- Eugene Gloria
- Prince Gomolvilas
- Philip Kan Gotanda
- Vince Gotera
- Amitav Ghosh
- Karl Taro Greenfeld
- Mary Matsuda Gruenewald
- Kovid Gupta
- Ganggang Hu Guidice (胡剛剛)
- Han Suyin (韩素音)
- Jessica Hagedorn
- Kimiko Hahn
- Sarah Haider
- Usha Haley
- Darrell Hamamoto
- Sheila Hamanaka
- Mohsin Hamid
- Jenny Han
- Mikiso Hane
- Sadakichi Hartmann
- Asma Gull Hasan
- Alamgir Hashmi
- S. I. Hayakawa
- Le Ly Hayslip
- Joseph Heco
- Lee Herrick
- Naomi Hirahara
- Lane Ryo Hirabayashi
- William Hohri
- Tess Uriza Holthe
- Cathy Park Hong
- Euny Hong, author
- Garrett Hongo
- Bill Hosokawa
- Khaled Hosseini
- Velina Hasu Houston
- Jeanne Wakatsuki Houston
- TC Huo
- Eddie Huang
- David Henry Hwang (黃哲倫), playwright
- Joe Ide
- Naomi Iizuka
- Lawson Fusao Inada
- Daniel K. Inouye
- Ayako Ishigaki
- Shizue Iwatsuki
- Pico Iyer
- Tania James
- Gish Jen
- Ha Jin (哈金)

== K–L ==
- Cynthia Kadohata
- Julie Kagawa
- Michiko Kakutani
- Mindy Kaling
- Jay Caspian Kang, journalist, novelist
- Michael Kang
- Minsoo Kang, historian and writer
- Younghill Kang, novelist
- Bhanu Kapil
- Sheba Karim
- Hiroshi Kashiwagi, poet, playwright, novelist
- Soji Kashiwagi, playwright
- Alma Katsu
- Sarah Kay
- Phil Kaye
- Nora Okja Keller, author of Comfort Woman (1997) and Fox Girl (2002)
- Porochista Khakpour
- Uzma Aslam Khan
- Parag Khanna
- Crystal Hana Kim
- Elaine H. Kim, author of Asian American Literature: An Introduction to the Writings and Their Social Context
- Jaegwon Kim, philosopher
- Myung Mi Kim
- Patti Kim
- Richard E. Kim, novelist
- Suki Kim, novelist
- Ronyoung Kim
- Maxine Hong Kingston, novelist
- Katie Kitamura
- Bharti Kirchner
- Alexandra Kleeman
- Lisa Ko
- Kyo Koike
- Dorinne K. Kondo
- Gowri Koneswaran
- R.F. Kuang
- Sarah Kuhn
- Helena Kuo
- Kevin Kwan, author
- Jean Kwok, author of Girl in Translation (2010)
- Dan Kwong
- Jhumpa Lahiri
- Him Mark Lai
- Andrew Lam
- Le Thi Diem Thuy
- Ang Lee
- Chang-Rae Lee
- Chin Yang Lee (黎錦揚)
- Don Lee
- Ed Bok Lee
- Gus Lee (李健孫)
- Helie Lee
- Karen An-hwei Lee
- Krys Lee
- Li-Young Lee
- Stacey Lee
- Joseph O. Legaspi
- Russell Leong
- Yiyun Li
- Eugene Lim, author of Fog & Car (2008, 2024), The Strangers (2013), Dear Cyborgs (2017), and Search History (2021), recipient of the Dos Passos Prize
- Sandra Lim
- Shirley Geok-lin Lim
- Adet and Anor Lin
- Ed Lin
- Grace Lin
- Tan Lin
- Tao Lin
- Lin Tai-yi
- R. Zamora Linmark
- Linh Dinh
- Eric Liu
- Ken Liu (刘宇昆), Hugo and Nebula Award winner
- Marjorie Liu
- Timothy Liu
- Malinda Lo
- Teresa Lo, novelist and screenwriter
- Vyvyane Loh
- Mimi Lok
- Bette Bao Lord
- Marie Lu
- David Wong Louie

== M–S ==
- Ling Ma
- Adeline Yen Mah (馬嚴君玲)
- Sezan Mahmud
- Michelle Malkin, conservative newspaper columnist
- Sally Wen Mao
- Maliha Masood
- Sujata Massey
- Kristina McMorris
- Tulika Mehrotra
- Hasan Minhaj
- Janice Mirikitani
- Marie Mutsuki Mockett
- Mary Anne Mohanraj
- Toshio Mori
- Mong-Lan
- Toshio Mori
- Mai Neng Moua
- Bharati Mukherjee
- David Mura
- Milton Murayama
- Sabina Murray
- An Na, novelist
- Shōson Nagahara
- Ken Narasaki, playwright
- Sunil Nayar, television writer
- Aimee Nezhukumatathil
- Celeste Ng
- Fae Myenne Ng
- Bich Minh Nguyen, novelist
- Kien Nguyen
- Qui Nguyen
- Nguyen Qui Duc
- Viet Thanh Nguyen
- Thuc Doan Nguyen
- Barbara Noda
- Yone Noguchi
- Sigrid Nunez
- John Okada
- Gary Okihiro
- Daniel Okimoto
- Dwight Okita
- Miné Okubo
- Matthew Olzmann
- Julie Otsuka
- Milton K. Ozaki
- Ruth Ozeki
- Pai Hsien-yung, Chinese Muslim writer
- Gary Pak, author of Children of a Fireland: A Novel (2004) and Language of the Geckos and Other Stories (2005)
- Greg Pak
- Ty Pak, author of A Korean Decameron: Tales of the Yi Dynasty (1961), Guilt Payment (1983), Cry Korea Cry (1999), Moonbay: Short Stories (1999), Dear, Daughter (2017) and Moonbay: Short Stories (1999)
- Linda Sue Park, novelist
- Therese Park
- Yongsoo Park, author of Boy Genius (2002), Las Cucarachas (2004), The Art of Eating Bitter: A Hausfrau Dad's Journey With Kids (2018), and Rated R Boy: Growing Up Korean in 1980s Queens (2020)
- Kamran Pasha
- Craig Santos Perez
- Andrew X. Pham
- Aimee Phan
- Bao Phi
- Michelle Naka Pierce
- Jon Pineda
- Ramesh Ponnuru
- Imad Rahman
- Aneesh Raman
- A.K. Ramanujan
- Anantanand Rambachan, religious writer
- Bino Realuyo
- Rishi Reddi
- Srikanth Reddy
- Paisley Rekdal
- Nina Revoyr
- Barbara Jane Reyes
- Bruce Reyes-Chow
- Margaret Rhee
- Lee Ann Roripaugh
- Patrick Rosal
- Shawna Yang Ryan
- Edward Said
- Albert Saijo
- Henry Sakaida
- Yumi Sakugawa
- Bienvenido Santos
- Rahadyan Sastrowardoyo
- Kiyo Sato
- Allen Say
- Lisa See, novelist
- Sunny Seki
- Vijay Seshadri
- Vikram Seth
- T. K. Seung, philosopher
- Purvi Shah, poet
- Naren Shankar, screenwriter
- Prageeta Sharma
- Brenda Shaughnessy
- Julie Shigekuni
- Brandon Shimoda, poet
- Sun Yung Shin, poet
- Bapsi Sidhwa
- SJ Sindu, novelist
- Keiho Soga, poet
- Monica Sone, autobiographer
- Cathy Song
- Etsu Inagaki Sugimoto
- Indu Sundaresan, historical fiction author
- Sui Sin Far
- Toyo Suyemoto
- Sokunthary Svay
- Arthur Sze
- Mai-Mai Sze

== T–Z ==
- Eileen Tabios
- Ronald Takaki, UC Berkeley history professor
- Grace Talusan
- Amy Tan, novelist
- Lucy Tan, novelist
- Karin Tanabe
- Ronald Tanaka
- Yuko Taniguchi
- Lysley Tenorio
- Madeleine Thien
- Bhagat Singh Thind, author
- Sherry Thomas, novelist
- Maggie Tokuda-Hall
- Teiko Tomita, poet
- Tim Toyama, playwright
- Barbara Tran
- Truong Tran
- Vu Tran
- Monique Truong
- Hsi Tseng Tsiang (a.k.a. H.T. Tsiang)
- Gail Tsukiyama
- Yoshiko Uchida
- Thrity Umrigar
- Loung Ung
- Amy Uyematsu
- Abraham Verghese
- Jose Garcia Villa
- Padma Viswanathan
- Saymoukda Vongsay
- Ocean Vuong
- Raees Warsi
- Onoto Watanna, a.k.a. Winnifred Eaton
- Qian Julie Wang
- Weike Wang
- Yun Wang
- Michi Weglyn
- Jade Snow Wong
- Jane Wong
- Nellie Wong
- Shawn Wong
- Merle Woo
- Sung J. Woo
- Bryan Thao Worra
- Fan Wu (吴帆)
- Julie Wu
- William F. Wu
- Mitsuye Yamada
- Hisaye Yamamoto
- Lois-Ann Yamanaka
- Iris Yamashita
- Karen Tei Yamashita
- Wakako Yamauchi
- Hanya Yanagihara
- Gene Luen Yang (楊謹倫)
- Jeff Yang
- Kao Kalia Yang
- Yanyi
- Taro Yashima
- John Yau
- Lisa Yee
- Paul Yoon
- Monica Youn
- C. Dale Young
- Charles Yu, novelist
- Lizzie Yu Der Ling
- Laurence Yep
- Paula Yoo
- Connie Young Yu, writer and historian
- Judy Yung
- Fareed Zakaria, political analyst author
- C. Pam Zhang
- Jenny Zhang
- Jenny Tinghui Zhang
- Kat Zhang
- Helen Zia (謝漢蘭)

== See also ==
- Asian American Literary Awards
- Asian American literature
- Asian/Pacific American Awards for Literature
- Before Columbus Foundation
- Chinese American literature
- List of American writers of Korean descent
- List of Asian Canadian writers
- Multi-Ethnic Literature of the United States
