= List of American writers of Korean descent =

Korean American literature treats a wide range of topics including Korean life in America, the intersection of American and Korean culture in the lives of young Korean Americans, as well as life and history on the Korean peninsula.

To be included in this list, the person must have a Wikipedia article showing they are Korean American writers or must have references showing they are Korean American writers and are notable.

== Korean American writers ==
- Claire Ahn
- Jung-hyo Ahn
- Matthew J. Baek
- Jane Bahk
- Haemi Balgassi
- Kendare Blake
- Steph Cha
- Theresa Hak Kyung Cha (1951–1982)
- Leonard Chang
- Alexander Chee
- Don Mee Choi
- Sook Nyul Choi
- Susan Choi
- Yoon Choi (author of Skinship)
- Seo-Young Chu
- Daniel Chun
- Catherine Chung
- Nicole Chung
- Susan Ee
- Heinz Insu Fenkl
- Joan Kwon Glass
- Jenny Han
- Johanna Hedva
- Lee Herrick
- Euny Hong
- Cathy Park Hong
- Y. Euny Hong
- Grace Jung
- Jay Caspian Kang
- Minsoo Kang
- Younghill Kang (1903–1972)
- Nora Okja Keller
- Alice Sola Kim
- Derek Kirk Kim
- Elaine H. Kim
- Elizabeth Kim
- Eugenia Kim
- Mike Kim
- Myung Mi Kim
- Patti Kim (1970–)
- Richard E. Kim
- Ronyoung Kim (1926–1987)
- Suji Kwock Kim
- Suki Kim
- E.J. Koh
- Cecilia Hae-Jin Lee
- Chang-Rae Lee
- Don Lee
- Ed Bok Lee
- Helie Lee
- Janice Y. K. Lee
- Marie Myung-Ok Lee
- Mary Paik Lee
- Min Jin Lee
- Yoon Ha Lee
- Young Jean Lee
- Walter K. Lew
- Nami Mun
- An Na
- Greg Pak
- Linda Sue Park
- Therese Park
- Yongsoo Park
- Sun Yung Shin
- Cathy-Lynn Song
- Kim Sunée
- Jane Jeong Trenka
- Ilyon Woo
- Sung J. Woo
- Paul Yoon
- Monica Youn
- Gabrielle Zevin
- Michelle Zauner

== See also ==
- List of Asian American writers
- Asian American literature
- Asian American Literary Awards
- Asian/Pacific American Awards for Literature
