= Ken Choy =

American dramatist

- Occupations: Performance artist, actor, writer, author, producer
- Years active: 1984–present
- Website: https://GizmoPorn.com

Ken Choy is an American writer of Chinese-Native Hawaiian ethnicity. He also is a performance artist and actor and owns and operates a shopping business in Southern California.

Choy was the subject of a two-part series on KCBS-TV Los Angeles that featured his book "Make Money Shopping," his website, Makemoneyshopping.org, and his shopping and mystery shopping business.

== Theatre and activism ==
Upon arriving in the Twin Cities, Choy immediately involved himself in the Asian American Renaissance, an Asian American arts organization. He taught classes and hosted AARGH!!, the Asian American Cabaret with poet and performance artist David Mura.

In 1992, Choy toured his one-man show Buzz Off Butterfly nationwide. He also directed and organized the large scale Asian American performance presentation "Miss Appropriated" at the Walker Art Center under the auspices of the performance group he founded, Asian Pacific American Renegades. Choy is discussed in Dorinne K. Kondo's "About Face," Linda Frye Burnham's "High Performance," David A. Schlossman's "Actors and Activists," and Deborah Wong's "Speak it Louder".

In 1993, Choy and Juliana Pegues staged a "die-in" protest at the Minnesota Opera performance of Madama Butterfly at St. Paul's Ordway Music Theatre. During the performance, Choy, dressed in women's clothing, and Pegues simulated their deaths by repeatedly falling in front of the orchestra pit while shouting, "No more Butterfly!". They were arrested for disorderly conduct and fined $25 after the charges were reduced to a petty misdemeanor. Choy stated that the protest was aimed at the offensive portrayal of Asia and Asian people in Madam Butterfly, asserting that it "perpetuates the notion of Asian lives as expendable."

In 1994, Choy received $5,000 as part of the Playwright's Center Jerome Fellowship in Minnesota. The program stated that he used the grant "for three months of travel and study in the Hawaiian Islands," researching and interviewing family members and island natives, "focusing on disenfranchisement and the disappearance of island culture due to industrialization, white settlement, tourism and environmental racism."

Choy founded and was co-chair of Pan Asian Voices for Equality (PAVE) and the Miss Saigon Protest Committee with Rita Nakashima Brock.

== Writing ==
Choy is the author of the book My Loveable Combustible Asian American Nuclear Family and the creator of the video blog, From Chaos to Love: My Loveable Combustible Asian American Nuclear Family journey.

He is the creator of the journalistic dialectic, "Living with Bill and Rob," an ongoing research project which explores the link between racism and mental illness and how those both are unflinchingly harnessed as a viable excuse for lack of human and community involvement and participation. Choy traversed those manifestations in a roommate situation with the titular subjects.

His screenplay Lazy Susan won first place in the Boulder Asian Film Festival in 2005.

== Festivals and conventions ==
Choy is the producer and founder of Breaking the Bow: The Independent Asian Pacific Islander Performing Artists and Writers Festival. The 1st festival was held October 22–25, 2009. The festival was produced by Mavericks of Asian Pacific Islander Descent (MAPID). Choy founded MAPID.

Under Choy's direction, MAPID also hosted the Battle of the Pitches and co-presented a short screenplay competition in partnership with the Los Angeles Asian Pacific Film Festival. Battle of the Pitches was a live competition for screenwriters designed to promote and discover creators within the Asian Pacific Islander (API) community who featured strong, prominent, and non-stereotypical API characters and themes. Similarly, MAPID partnered with the Writers Guild of America, West, to identify talented API screenwriters through their short screenplay competition.

In 2010, MAPID launched the first Asian Pacific Islander TV Pilot Shootout in collaboration with Fox Broadcasting. Shootout provided API writers the opportunity to submit a synopsis, logline, sample pilot script pages, and a 2-minute pitch video. The top five entries were paired with directors to create 1-minute teasers. Ultimately, one of the entries secured a pitch meeting with a television executive. In October 2010, Choy co-organized ID Film Fest, which included the Asian American Independent Features Conference, with Quentin Lee and Koji Steven Sakai at the Japanese American National Museum. During this event, MAPID premiered a second Battle of the Pitches competition, in addition to five teasers for API TV Pilot Shootout and a Filmmaker's Crash Course session.

He has moderated panels at Wondercon and Comic-Con.

== Notable Theater Works ==
- Charlene Chan in "Me?"
- Sticky Substances
- Buzz off Butterfly
- Miss Appropriated
- Ken Choy's Theatrical Extravaganza Lazy Susan
