= Dragon Ladies: Asian American Feminists Breathe Fire =

1997 book edited by Sonia Shah

- Language: English
- Genre: Anthology
- Published: 1997, South End Press
- ISBN: 9780896085763

Dragon Ladies: Asian American Feminists Breathe Fire is a book edited by Sonia Shah, published in 1997. The work contains a preface by Yuri Kochiyama and a foreword by Karin Aguilar-San Juan. The book is divided into four parts: Strategies and Visions, An Agenda for Change, Global Perspectives, and Awakening to Power, consisting of a collection of 16 essays and interviews by Asian American writers, artists, and activists presenting their views on feminism.

The book describes Asian Women frustration with the mainstream feminist movement in the United States dominated by white women. It addresses the attitudes of Asian women on a wide variety of topics including insights on immigration, jobs, culture, and the media as it tells the history and formation of the Asian Feminist Movement.

== History ==
=== First wave of Asian women ===
The migration of Asian women to the United States first started in the 1800s. The first wave of Chinese immigrants were smuggled into the country and came to be known as prostitutes. The reputation generated as a result, led to a negative perception and attitude toward Asian American woman that would continue to plague them to this day. Eventually, in the late-1800s, anti-Japanese and Chinese movements were formed, and although the population of Asian immigrants was low, racism was virulent. The U.S. immigration law in pre-1960's allowed very few Asian men, and even fewer women into the nation, but women emigrated before this time were employed as either servants or laundress. Despite their lack of presence, Asian women had a negative effect on Asian men who were working. It enabled U.S. employers to pay Asian men less due to the fact they didn't have families to support as opposed to other laborers. During World War II, Japanese Americans lost all of their belongings and were put in internment camps in exchange. Women who tried to request leave were dismissed by government officials because of their status and reputation. As a result, Asian women fared many obstacles that left them oppressed. It wasn't until 1965 when the immigration act welcomed an influx of Asian immigrants into the states to fill job positions like physicians, doctors, and engineers, did it alter the face of Asian America and politics.

=== Asian movement ===
Before the formation of the Asian feminism movement that is known today, there was the Asian American Movement. From the early 1950s to early 1960s, the civil rights movement was ensuing. Asian Americans were pulled into the campaign in support, but more importantly, to argue their own racial identity. The spark that led to the formation of the Asian movement was the influence of Dr. Martin Luther King Jr. who motivated them to "demand access to policy makers and initiate advocacy programs for their own communities". It was later Malcolm X inspired the movement to reclaim traditions from earlier generations and strive for liberation instead.

In 1968, the first Asian collective movement began with the San Francisco State Strike. The action took place at a college campus, organized by minority groups made of Asians, Latinos, and American Indians, and more. The group fought for ethnic studies, open admissions, and a redefinition of the education system. Through this successful strike, Asian Americans were able to link their lives to the struggle of earlier generations of Chinese immigrants laborers, Japanese American concentration camp resisters, and others, while simultaneously liberating themselves from the oppressions society had placed on them. This event would initiate a series of other movements such as the anti-Vietnam war movement.

However, despite the goals of the Asian movement for social justice, equality, and rights, the campaign only focused on the liberation for Asian men. The Asian women, though their issues were the same, were excluded. Asian male activists believed that the women belonged to them, and nothing more. They rationalized after years of Asian women being excluded from America, and Asian men unable to seek sexual pleasure from them, they believed they had a right to utilize them however they wanted; not as people that should have rights, but as possessions.

This idea of subjugation sent a crackle through the Asian movement. As a result, the first wave of Asian women organizing formed. Women of the faction bonded together in response in attempt to reason with the men, but little results came into fruition. The Asian men would not change their attitudes, and the women that nursed together, couldn't garner support from fellow Asian women who were unwilling to help. The reason for this reluctance was because of the U.S. immigration law in 1965. At the time, many high-value professions needed to be filled in the U.S. economy, and as a result, the law allowed an influx of Asian women to take those roles and led them to be preoccupied with making money. Thus, many Asian women were primarily concerned with enhancing their status and opportunities instead of fighting for social justice.

=== 1960s, '70s - Asian Feminism Movement ===
As a result of the tension between Asian men and women, the women began to attend separate meetings together to discuss the challenges of the Asian American movement. It was later that they realized that the only movement going to represent them and their interests was an Asian Feminism Movement. Despite the lack of early support from fellow Asian women, the Asian feminism movement still went ahead. Members performed community activism by providing social services, making public presentations, and having their voice heard through media, and writing. In 1969, this resulted in the creation of Gidra, a monthly newspaper focusing on Asian feminism.

Later, one of the most important milestone's occurred in April 1971, at the Vancouver Indochinese Women's Conference event, where marginalized women from all over North America from respected liberation movements met with Indochinese women in "exchange of information, solidarity against United states, imperialism, and what it was doing". In 1971, women activists from universities and communities came together to form the Asian Women's Center, its mission to tackle community concerns. This resulted in the creation of the International Women's Day, a celebration to bring together the many Asian groups in the neighborhood. A year later, another organization was formed; the Little Friends Playgroup based out of Los Angeles in helping the Chinese community in Chinatown. That same year, the first Asian Women Studies course at UCLA was implemented as a result of the San Francisco Strike in 1968 and the community of Asian women in the area.

While there were many progressions made in the early years of the movement, there soon came an ideological development that halted its momentum. There was a growing debate between the women in the Asian feminism movement as to whether they identified themselves more to the feminism movement or the Asian American Movement. At the time, there was a rebellion against the Asian American Movement for its male chauvinism, yet there was a strong alliance to stay connected due to the intersectionality they shared as a race. On the other hand, the mainstream feminism movement was known as "anti-male", an idea Asian women did not want to be associated with since it wasn't consistent with their ideals. The dispute to whether feminism was defined as "someone who believes in women's rights and equality" or a battle between men and women was a topic of discussion in its early days in determining their agenda and action.

=== 1976, '80s - Regression ===
In the late 1970s, the Asian feminism movement took a turn for the worse. In 1976, International Women's Day had its least successful outing after three years. That year, the AWC (Asian Women's Center) had decided to include other marginalized groups and Third World women with the intent to learn to understand and form alliances with one another, however, given the lack sensitivity and experience between the different groups of women, it caused more division than cooperation.

That same year, an economic crisis was occurring. Many Americans blamed greedy corporations and President Regan, who was president at the time for the situation. In return, these big corporations who were losing profits, began to put the fault on the democratic surges in the previous decade, where many existing systems of authority in universities, businesses, and politics suffered because people no longer had the same obligation to follow them, and as a result, problems of control and order arose.

In response to this complication, President Ronald Reagan incorporated Reaganomics, where businesses no longer had the government on them, taxes were reduced for the rich, and social programs were cut for the poor. As a by product, many poor neighborhoods suffered that included Asian Americans, Latinos, and African American populations, the latter group being most affected of all. Though the Asian feminism continued, the setback caused Asian women to focused their attention on surviving day-to-day from poverty and hate crimes.

=== 1990s - Revival ===
The status on Asian women changed at the start of the 1990s. Asian women that had been initially in high demand to the workforce were no longer needed. In exchange, cheap labor pools now lead the charge of employment for Asian women where working conditions are horrible, pay has been degraded, and the protection for workers are non-existent. In other words, the policies that once benefitted Asian women when they were needed professional professions have disappeared, but the legal rights that have always plagued Asian women are still present and working against them.

However, as a silver lining, Asian women activists have sprung up in response, and support for Asian women feminism have increased. One of the responses that was formed was the Asian Immigrant Women Advocates or AIWA to combat the labor movement and helped "secure $15,000 in back wages for Asian immigrant seamstresses who had been stiffed by their employer, Lucky Sewing Company". Other organizations have formed and others have been revived after previously being dormant, but all have the same agenda to represent Asian American women's interests. Before the 1990s, there had been thirty years of activists combating racism, sexism, media stereotypes, hate crimes, and U.S. imperialism, but it wasn't until enough support was garnered did the face of Asian political movement appeared.

== Origin ==
The title Dragon Ladies originated from Empress Tsu-hsi, who ruled China from 1898 to 1908. As a tyrant, she was known as the Dragon Lady because of her cold-blooded ways to kill anyone who challenged her authority; methods included poison, forced suicide, and strangling. The book is titled after Dragon Ladies to represent the Asian American feminist movement not as a cold-blooded creature, but as an embodiment of power to fight for representation, justice, and equality for the Asian American women.

Dragon Ladies was published after the mainstream feminism movement, and Asian American movement failed to represent the issues and interests of Asian American women. Therefore, the book sets out to "describe, expand, and nurture the growing resistance of Asian American women and girls and their allies" by bringing together the reactions of female Asian Americans. Shah sees the work as contributing to an understanding of "a growing social movement and an emerging way of looking at the world" resulting from racism and patriarchy in American society and as well as U.S. aggression against Asia.

== Book ==
The book is divided into four parts, each focusing on a different purpose, they are:

=== Strategies and visions ===
The first module of the four part set, Strategies and Visions focuses on strategies for Asian feminism to "build movements in a consistent and long-reaching way". In one of the essay's, Strategies from the Field: Organizing the Asian American Feminist Movement, the author Pegues promoted combining the identity-based community model and political agenda model as complementary instead of exclusively. The identity-based community model on its own concentrates on shared experiences of racism, class, and sexism; however, it is deprived of political agenda, the analysis among shared identities. Such as "where is our place in social change movements, and how do we uniquely affect how movements shaped?" By incorporating the two models, Pegues explains it will shape the Asian feminism with a sense of belonging and purpose by defining whom they are willing to interact in respects with identity and political beliefs.

In the essay Slippery Path: Organizing Resistance to Violence Against Women, by Bhattacharjee stated a vision to "transform power structures that perpetuate violence against women and to build power among women". To achieve that, a strategy pointed in this article included challenging the foundations of exploitation by targeting the people who exploited them and naming the structures that support the oppressive frameworks; as well as working with other organizations to aid them in their goal towards liberation.

Other essays presented in this section from other contributors provide other varying strategies and visions.

=== Agenda for change ===
The second module of the four part set, Towards an Agenda focuses on plan and action. The book explains what needs to be done to create and lead a successful movement. This includes defining a vision and a goal that will ensure Asian women won't drop out and will continue to support, and perform action. One of the issues advocated is economic change: Asian women sit at the bottom of the status quo and are among the poorest because of country origin. Second, generational issue: as generations of Asian Americans move along, how are identity and goals maintained? Third, media: racism is prevalent in media as Asian women stereotypes are reinforced and representation is few.

Ultimately, able to control images and represent how Asian women want to be represented, and point those concerns out there, leads to action, thus leads to change.

=== Global perspectives ===
The third module, An Agenda for Change focuses on awareness and unity. It explains how mainstream feminism has not advocated the interests and concerns of Asian women, despite having the same issues being argued for. Thus, Asian feminism challenge for inclusion. However, in order for White feminism to do that, they must be made aware of, educated, and understand that Asian is just not one race, but full of different ethnicities carrying unique culture, issues, and perspectives that must be advocated for. Additionally, it includes aiding and campaigning for women outside of United States. Feminism is more than just women or White, feminism is for all genders and ethnicities in all places of the world; building a stronger front against the oppressions that all feminism movement are arguing for.

In the essay, Lost in Translation: Western Feminism and Asian Women, author Aguilar states that sisterhood isn't sisterhood just because experience of oppressions are the same if there is no unity among the women. The common phrase, "a victory for women anywhere is a victory for all women" is false because Aguilar argues the idea: Would U.S. women celebrate the successes won by Philippine slum dweller women in their country? How many U.S. women would even know or care? Thus, Asian feminism suggests that all feminism movements come together to "develop a critical understanding of women's condition and to forge a sense of solitary among [all] women".

=== Awakening to power ===
The last module, Awakening to Power focuses on various activists and what led each woman to become a part of the Asian feminism movement. One of the women focused on is famous activist Yuri Kochiyama, notable for her work with Black liberation leader, Malcolm X. Kochiyama had her political awakening when she was a child after her father was taken away due to the events of Pearl Harbor on December 7, 1941. After experiencing the concentration camps, and later in her life meeting with women who survived the atomic-bomb in Hiroshima, she realized she needed to fight for her civil rights.

From there, after Kochiyama moved to Harlem, she went to join the Harlem Parents Committee to work on local community issues, before shortly united with Malcolm X to fight for human rights. Later, she was on one of thirty activists who seized control of the Statue of Liberty to protest the imprisonment of Puerto Rican independentistas. Throughout her life, Kochiyama worked with various organizations and supported many others such as the National Committee for the Defense of Political Prisoners, Black Panthers, and Concerned Japanese Americans.

The legacy she drew up was the radical activism she fought for, for not just herself, or a single race, but other communities and groups as well. Thus, she is seen as a role model for other Asian women around her to step up and advocate for what is right. Kochiyama is an important figure in Asian women's political history.

Other activists included in this section are mother and daughter duo Shamita Das Dasgupta, and Sayantani DasGupta, the journey of minister Cheng Imm Tan, and interview with Margarita Alcantara, Leslie Mah, and Selena Whang.

== Topics ==
Many ideas are discussed. The main subjects are:

=== Immigration and jobs ===
Immigration and jobs are two of four major topics featured in Dragon Ladies. The book discusses different periods of immigration from initial smuggling, to helping the economy, to now being used as cheap labor in horrible working conditions and little pay. Additionally, the books points out various impediments for Asian women settled in the U.S. such as isolation, access to health, anti-immigration, and zero-population movements.

Most Asian immigrants do not know English when arrive at the states. As a result, they cannot communicate nor assimilate easily with the Western culture. Thus, this creates stress of isolation and also fear or deportation. In health, many Asian women have medical history. However, due to the ability to unable to speak, diagnoses are hard to uncover. On top of that, current federal healthcare for immigrants are being cut off. With anti-immigration and zero-population movements, Americans advocate for the halt of immigration so that supplies and resources such as food aren't rapidly depleted, but also so that environments aren't polluted because these groups believe they are the cause. Immigrants already in the states are pressured to leave.

On another note, immigrants moving to the U.S. to be employed and have a better future instead find themselves forced into working specific low-paying jobs with little benefits. This is due to the United States having "welfare reforms" by removing social services and benefits that take care of children and the elderly, and in replacement, have Asian women provide those services cheaply. The U.S. immigration policy acts as reinforcement that ensures to "recruit migrant women as contract laborers or temporary workers who are ineligible for the protections and rights afforded to citizens". Jobs that Asian women are forced into are homecare workers, domestic workers, nannies, and servants.

Thus, Asian feminism advocates for English classes, translators in hospitals, more support services for immigrant Asian women, and to "mobilize and educate Asian women to assert our right to live in the and work productively wherever we choose".

=== Media and culture ===
Media and culture are the other two major topics discussed in the book. Since the migration of Asian immigrants in the 1800s, many of stereotypes, and prejudices have been constructed as a result of their early days in prostitution. Examples include, concubine, geisha girl, and lotus blossom; and among traits such as small-eyed or "chinky", and "lisp" Asian accent. These expectations still persist in society's view on Asian women today, and leads how the U.S. media portrays them. As a result, Asian women are negatively and unfairly shaped in status, self-image, and potential.

Media coverage on Asian women explored in the book include fashion and movies. Despite a rise in Asian attire in Western culture, it is not a positive note for Asian women nor the culture they carry. In the essay Critical Visions: The Representation and Resistance of Asian Women, Lu states that fashion designers in the West takes what the East has, and turn them into something that Americans wouldn't be embarrassed to be in: "to look Asian without actually being Asian, to take the essence of Asian culture, and mutate aesthetically pleasing without all the political baggage". As a result, Asian cultures are misrepresented and fail to grow appropriately in Western society. By falsely altering Asian clothes to American standards, it gives the idea that Asian women and culture are not so different, but in reality it doesn't accustom Asian experience nor existence.

In movies, Asian women are victimize. They play stereotypical characters such as a prostitute or despite characters written as Asian, roles are instead given to other races, mainly White women. This is known as white-washing. In doing so, movies, plays and other media forms fail to be historically accurate, disregarding Asian existence, and erasing the culture of stories that were initially driven by Asian-based characters. A famous play pointed by Lu is "Madame Butterfly", where the character is an Asian women, but is instead played by an Anglo actor.

Today, activists argue for racial authenticity and stop against job discrimination as they raise cultural production to educate, reclaim history, shape Asian women future, and produce new images to expand the representations of Asian women to control their own paths.

== Contributors ==
The writers and activists who have contributed to the work are:

Delia D. Aguilar an Ethnic Studies and Women's Studies professor at Bowling Green State University in Ohio.

Karin Aguilar-San Juan the editor of The State of Asian America: Activism and Resistance in the 1990s. She teaches Asian American studies and Sociology in California.

Margarita Alcantara the editor of the 'zine Bamboo Girl.

Anannya Bhattacharjee the former Executive Director of the Committee Against Anti-Asian Violence and founding member of Sakhi for South Asian Women.

Kshiteeja Bhide a psychotherapist who works with corporations and their employees with special culture requirements. She is also a founder of Women's Entrepreneurial Trust, an organization dedicated to the education and empowerment of women toward economic and social self-sufficiency.

Grace Chang the author of Gatekeeping and Housekeeping: The politics of Regulating Women's Migration.

Pamela Chiang a worker at Asian Pacific Environmental Network.

Milyoung Cho a worker for the National Asian Pacific American Women's Forum.

Sayantani Dasgupta an MD/MPH student at Johns Hopkins University and freelance writer.

Shamita Das Dasgupta a psychology professor at Rutgers University and one of the founders of Manavi, an organization for battered South Asian women based in New Jersey.

Diane C. Fujino an Asian American Studies professor, and a founding member of the Political Organization Asian sisters for Ideas in Action Now.

Elanie Kim an Asian American Studies professor at Berkeley. She is also the Chair of Ethnic Studies.

Yuri Kochiyama a human rights activist.

Miriam Ching Louie a worker for Asian Immigrant Women Advocates and the Women of Color Resource Center.

Lynn Lu an editor and publisher for South End Press.

Meizhu Lui an activist.

Leslie Mah a guitarist for Tribe 8.

Sia Nowrojee a board member for the National Asian Women Health Organization. She also a consultant in sexual and reproductive health, specializing in the impact of gender on women's health.

Juliana Pegues a writer and activist.

Bandana Purkayashta a member of SNEHA, and an educator and community activist.

Shyamala Raman a founder and member of SNEHA. She is also a professor of Economics and International Studies and Director of International Studies at Saint Joseph College in Connecticut.

Purvi Shah a worker for Sakhi for South Asian Women.

Seema Shah a student at Oberlin College in Ohio.

Jael Silliman a Women's Studies professor at the University of Iowa, and is involved with the National Asian Women's Health Organization, Pro-Choice Resource Center, International Projects Assistance Services, and Committee on Women, Population, and Environment.

Julie Sze an organizer with the New York City Environmental Justice Alliance. She is also a PhD student in American Studies, studying constructions of race, nature, and environmental justice.

Cheng Imm Tan a Senior Associate Minister at the Unitarian Universalist Urban Ministry. Also a co-founder of the Asian Women's Task Force Against Domestic Violence in Boston.

Selena Whang a Ph.D. candidate in performance Studies at the Tisch School of the Arts, New York University.

Helen Zia a daughter of Chinese immigrants and an activist for social change. She is also a writer and journalist with many of work in publications.

== Impact ==
Sonia Shah, Dragon Ladies' accomplished the task of "representing a political aesthetic made possible by turning our professional intellectual critiques to trenchant political activism". It has been a vital contribution to Asian American Studies as well as to the openings of more Asian contemporary courses around the world. In addition, other issues such as Queer Asian America have emerged greatly due to the success and influence of the book to society. More Asian women are inspired to join the Asian Feminist Movement as a result of the existence it has historically and personally. Today, the movement has grown into a global movement where all Asian women of all countries and their allies are at the forefront battling social structures, injustices, and inequities; and explaining terms, ideas, and stories for people to talk about in the hopes of creating justice, understanding, and harmony for all women in the world.
