= Patti Kim =

Patti or Patty Kim may refer to:

- Patti Kim (singer) (born 1938), South Korean pop singer
- Patti Kim (writer) (born 1970), Korean American writer
- Patty Kim (filmmaker), Canadian filmmaker
- Patty Kim (politician) (born 1973), American politician
