= Famous Suicides of the Japanese Empire =

2008 debut novel

- Author: David Mura
- Publisher: Coffee House Press
- Publication date: 2008-09-01
- Pages: 269
- ISBN: 978-1566892155

Famous Suicides of the Japanese Empire is a 2008 debut novel by David Mura. It follows a Japanese American family in wake of internment after World War II.

== Plot ==
The novel follows a Japanese American family's resettlement in Chicago after internment during World War II.

== Critical reception ==
Historical Novel Society called the novel "haunting" and stated that "Readers will be riveted by the connection between this hidden aspect of history and the demise of both Nisei and Sansei family members haunted by an unspoken civil war that former Japanese camp prisoners and their descendants cannot escape."

The Seattle Times stated that "Mura, in exploring the ambiguous dividing line between public event and personal psychodrama, does justice to both."
