= Pegues =

Pegues is a surname. Notable people bearing the surname include the following:

- Derek Pegues (born 1986), American football player
- Jeff Pegues (born 1974), American news correspondent
- JJ Pegues (born 2001), American football player
- Juliana Pegues, American writer, performer and community activist
- Lou Courtney, American soul singer and songwriter born Louis Pegues (born 1943)
- Mike Pegues (born 1978), American college basketball coach and former player
- Steve Pegues (born 1968), American former Major League Baseball player
