= Sonia Shah =

American journalist (born 1969)

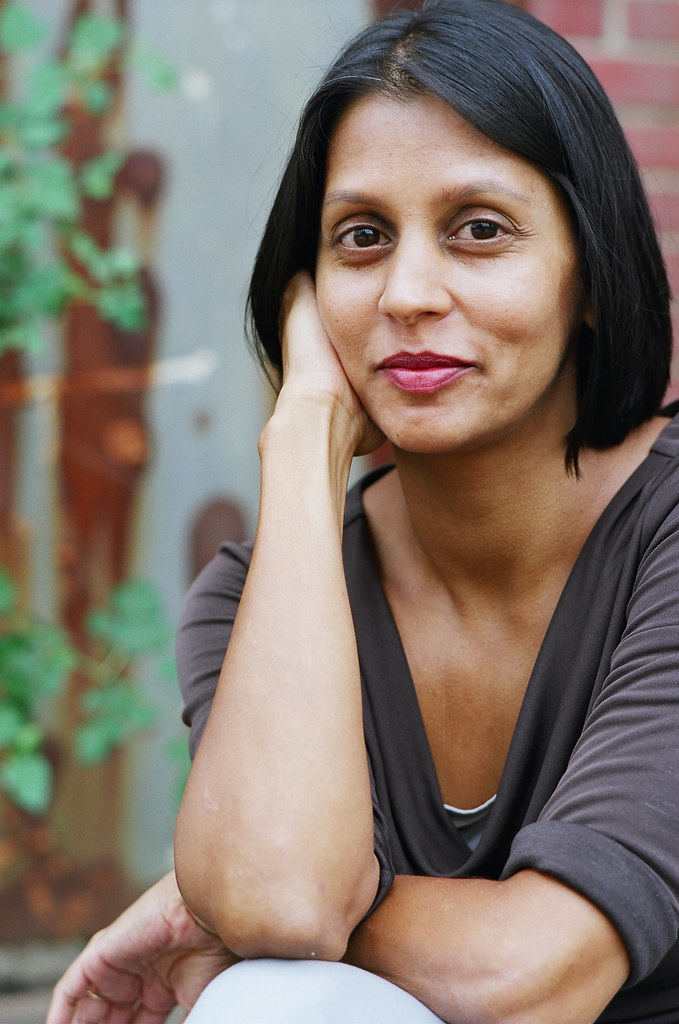
- Born: 1969 (age 56–57)
- Education: Oberlin College
- Occupation: Journalist
- Writing career
- Language: English
- Years active: 1992-2020

Sonia Shah (born 1969 in New York City, United States) is an American investigative journalist and author of articles and books on corporate power, global health and human rights.

== Early life ==
Shah was born in 1969 in New York City to Indian immigrants. Growing up, she shuttled between the northeastern United States, where her parents practiced medicine, and Mumbai and Bangalore, India, where her extended working-class family lived, developing a lifelong interest in inequality between and within societies. She later earned BA in journalism, philosophy, and neuroscience from Oberlin College. She later became the managing editor of Nuclear Times, joined South End Press in 1997, and began writing full-time on developing countries and corporate power in 2000.

== Work ==
Shah's writing, based on original reportage from around the world, from India and South Africa to Panama, Malawi, Cameroon, and Australia, has been featured on current affairs shows around the United States, like Democracy Now!, as well as on the BBC, Australia's Radio National, and Ted.com. A frequent keynote speaker at political conferences, Shah has lectured at universities and colleges across the country, including Columbia's Earth Institute, MIT, Harvard, Muhlenberg College, Stetson University, and elsewhere.

Her writing on human rights, medicine, and politics have appeared in a range of magazines from Playboy, Ms. Magazine, Sojourners, The Lancet, Salon, and Orion to The Progressive and Knight-Ridder. She has also published articles in The New York Times, Mother Jones, The Wall Street Journal, Scientific American, Foreign Affairs, and New York Times Magazine. Her television appearances include A&E, CNN, and Radiolab, She has also consulted on many documentary film projects, from the ABC to Channel 4 in the UK. Shah is a former writing fellow of The Nation Institute and the Puffin Foundation. The annual human rights award, the Puffin/Nation Prize for Creative Citizenship, is given to someone who has done distinctive and courageous social justice work.

In 1992, Between Fear and Hope, a book she edited, was published. In 1999, Dragon Ladies: Asian American Feminists Breathe Fire, a book she edited, was published. It described Asian Women frustration with the mainstream feminist movement in the United States dominated by White Women. The book also addressed the attitudes of Asian women on a wide variety of topics including insights on immigration, jobs, culture and the media as it tells the history and formation of the Asian Feminist Movement. Caroline Chung Simpson described the book, in a review for the Signs: Journal of Women in Culture and Society, that the book was a vital contribution to Asian American Studies.

In 2004, her book Crude: The Story of Oil was published. This book chronicles the story of petroleum production. She was later interviewed by ABC as part of their 2008 documentary with the same title as her book. Shah later said that she agreed to the documentary filmmaker giving the film the same name as her book and stated that it had "amazing footage" of her in it. The book was later published in other countries like Italy and Greece.

In 2006, Shah published another book entitled The Body Hunters. This book focused on indigent patients used as test subjects by pharmaceutical companies. Ted.com argued that this book established Shah as a "heavy hitter in the field of investigative human rights reporting. The book was adapted from an article in The Nation.

A few years later, in 2010, she published a book titled The Fever: How Malaria Has Ruled Humankind for 500,000 Years. This book was described by Kirkus Reviews as a sad and "sobering account" which communicated "important lessons" for readers, and the year's "most significant science book" for general readers by Cleveland.com. It was praised by the Washington Independent Review of Books for chronicling "the science and social impact of malaria."

In 2016, Shah published a book about pandemics and disease entitled Pandemic: Tracking Contagions, from Cholera to Ebola and Beyond. The book was described as a "not fun reading, but...necessary", and a look at the "major contagious disease outbreaks of modern history." The New York Times was more critical, arguing that the book had "no clear focus" and superficially rehashed "the existing literature." The book was selected as a finalist for Los Angeles Times Book Prize in science and technology in 2017, the National Association of Science Writers Science in Society Award, and other awards.

Her 2020 book, The Next Great Migration, describes both human migration and animal migration as a consistent pattern throughout the history of humanity and life on earth. It also describes the trend towards building border barriers such as the Trump Wall on the Mexico–United States border, and the harm inflicted by these structures.

== Personal life ==
She lives in Baltimore with molecular ecologist Mark Bulmer and their two sons. She previously lived in North Queensland, Australia with her family.

Shah is also politically active. This includes pushing the Baltimore County Council to abandon a redistricting plan and calling for more Black majority Council districts. Shah also criticized the county's district structure, saying it was "devised in the 1950s" and argued that it was "outdated" and did not reflect the county's current demographics.

== Bibliography ==
External videos
- Presentation by Shaw on The Fever, August 2, 2010, C-SPAN
- Forum on infectious diseases and pandemics moderated by Shah, featuring discussion of Pandemic: Tracking Contagions, From Cholera to Ebola and Beyond, February 23, 2016, C-SPAN
- Presentation by Shah on Pandemic, February 26, 2016, C-SPAN

- —, ed. (1992). Between Fear and Hope. Fortkamp Publishing Company. ISBN 187917510X.
- —, ed. (1999). Dragon Ladies: Asian American Feminists Breathe Fire. South End Press. ISBN 0896085759.
- — (2004). Crude: The Story of Oil. Seven Stories Press. ISBN 1-58322-625-7.
- — (2006). The Body Hunters. The New Press. ISBN 1-56584-912-4.
- — (2010). The Fever: How Malaria Has Ruled Humankind for 500,000 Years. Farrar, Straus and Giroux. ISBN 978-0-374-23001-2.
- — (2016). Pandemic: Tracking Contagions, from Cholera to Ebola and Beyond. Macmillan Publishers. ISBN 978-0-374-12288-1.
- — (2020). The Next Great Migration: The Beauty and Terror of Life on the Move. Bloomsbury USA. ISBN 978-1-63557-197-4.
