= The Care and Handling of Roses with Thorns =

2012 novel by Margaret Dilloway

The Care and Handling of Roses With Thorns
- First edition
- Author: Margaret Dilloway
- Language: English
- Genre: Chick lit Fiction
- Publisher: G.P. Putnam's Sons
- Publication date: August 2012
- Publication place: United States
- ISBN: 978-0399157752

The Care And Handling Of Roses With Thorns is a novel written by Margaret Dilloway. The novel was released in August 2012. The book is about a rose breeder and teacher who also has kidney disease. Dilloway states that the inspiration for this book came from her sister-in-law, who had three kidney transplants where she ultimately died of kidney failure in 2011. The teaching portion of the character comes from Dilloway's teaching experiences and those of her sister-in-law, who was also a high school teacher.

== Awards ==
The book won the Reference and User Services Association of the American Library Association 2012 award for top Women's Fiction. Entertainment Weekly gives the book a B+ rating.
