= The Fever: How Malaria Has Ruled Humankind for 500,000 Years =

2010 nonfiction book by Sonia Shah

- Author: Sonia Shah
- Language: English
- Subject: History of medicine
- Publisher: Farrar, Straus and Giroux
- Publication date: July 6, 2010
- Publication place: United States
- Pages: 320 (Hardcover)
- ISBN: 9780374230012

The Fever: How Malaria Has Ruled Humankind for 500,000 Years is a 2010 nonfiction book by Sonia Shah. The book explores the history of malaria, its impact on human history, efforts to eradicate the disease, and its effects on the modern world.

== Contents ==
Malaria first emerged 500,000 years ago. Shah traces the development of various malarial subspecies, including P. malariae, P. vivax, and P. falciparum. She discusses the human mutations that led to resistance against malaria. In Africa, evolutionary pressure led to the development of Duffy-negative and sickle cell disease. In Rome, this selective pressure led to the development of G6PD deficiency. Shah discusses malaria and its effects on the Roman Empire, attributing its fifth century decline in part to the emergence of P. falciparum.

In the 1600s, English colonists at Jamestown brought P. vivax to North America; it quickly became endemic. In the late 1690s, Scottish entrepreneur William Paterson envisioned a road through Panama instead of a canal. The Spanish had previously failed at building a canal, in large part due to malaria. Paterson's disastrous mission became known as the Darien scheme. The majority of the inhabitants of the New Caledonia colony died. The settlement was quickly abandoned.

In the 18th century, the Atlantic slave trade brought millions of enslaved Africans, as well as P. falciparum, to the Americas. By the late 1700s, New Englanders began building milldams. Artificial lakes attracted mosquitoes; flooding led to repeated malaria outbreaks.

In 1880, French scientist Alphonse Laveran isolated and identified Plasmodium as the causative agent for malaria. In India, Ronald Ross identified the transmission of malaria in birds. In 1896, Italian researcher Amico Bignami hypothesized that the bite of the mosquito, not mosquito-tainted water, was the method of transmission. Fellow scientist Giovanni Grassi identified the correct species of mosquito in human transmission. Controversially, in 1902, Ross was the sole winner of the Nobel Prize in Physiology or Medicine.

In 1903, the USA began a campaign against malaria during the construction of the Panama Canal. William C. Gorgas was hired to protect the workers from malaria, an effort which was only partially successful.

By the early 20th century, the Dutch had a monopoly on quinine production due to their plantations in Java. Although the Dutch enjoyed high profits, most people could not afford the price of quinine. By 1942, Germany and Japan had taken control of 95% of the world's quinine. Lack of quinine supply spurred Allied scientists to research new therapies. Quinacrine and chloroquine were discovered independently by both German and American groups. Initially, quinacrine was extremely effective at suppressing malaria; however, by the end of WWII, resistance to the drug was already developing.

In the 1940s, DDT was adopted. By 1951, malaria had been eradicated from the United States. However, by the mid-1950s, DDT-resistant mosquitoes were appearing. Due to concerns for environmental toxicity, use of DDT was phased out over the following years.

In 1958, Eisenhower signed a bill allocating funds for a worldwide malaria elimination plan. In addition to humanitarian goals, the USA hoped to gain allies against the spread of communism by currying favor in countries with endemic malaria. Initial periods of success were followed by relapses, and international efforts to combat malaria faltered.

In 1967, the Chinese government began Project 523, leading to the development of artemisinin. Due to distrust between China and the West, widespread adoption of artemisinin-based drugs was limited until the 1990s.

In 1998, the WHO announced Roll Back Malaria. International efforts to fight the disease increased over the next decade. The idea of distributing insecticide-treated mosquito nets became popular, but was not always effective for social and cultural reasons.

For years, international aid with artemisinin-based pills was limited, as donors preferred to supply the cheaper but less-effective chloroquine. It was not until 2004 that the Global Fund agreed to provide funding to purchase these drugs. In the gap, substandard and fake artemisinin pills contributed to growing resistance.

Shah discusses her own travels to malaria-endemic regions, including Panama and Malawi. She visits malaria research institutes such as Harvard. Shah also discussed the way in which people living in malaria-endemic areas view the disease. There may be distrust in the medical establishment and disbelief in the mosquito as the primary vector. Many people consider malaria to be a mild disease, or simply a fact of life. In the present day, private corporations such as Marathon, Exxon-Mobil, and the Gates Foundation have taken leading roles in the fight against malaria. Shah comments about the different motivations behind this shift away from the WHO and NGOs. Shah concludes that the only effective way to win the fight against malaria will be from local communities, rather than top-down international efforts.

== Reception and awards ==
In a review for the Journal of Clinical Investigation, Christopher Plowe called Shah's book "gripping, balanced, and impressively wise." The review praised the book for its thorough exploration of malaria, despite its lack of technical jargon. Plowe notes that there are a few minor stumbles: for example, Shah makes a common error when describing the basis by which malaria develops resistance to chloroquine. The review praised the way in which Shah's background as a journalist allowed her to portray important historical figures, as well as modern-day fighters against malaria. Plowe concluded that the book is both humbling and discouraging, yet enlightening and entertaining.

A review in The Journal of Nuclear Medicine commented on Shah's style, which avoids excessive scientific detail in favor of simple prose. The review stated that Shah "provides us a unique perspective about those living day to day with the parasite." They commented about the legacy of colonialism with regards to malaria, noting that modern-day research centers such as Harvard are often in areas where malaria is not endemic. The reviewers concluded by recommending the book to readers interested in "health-care epidemiology, political health-care policy, and medical technologic advances of this deadly disease."

Writing for NPR, Michael Schaub states that Shah showed "the same curiosity, eye for history, and anger on behalf of the oppressed" which permeated her earlier works. Schaub felt that the book's conversational writing style was its biggest strength. The review felt that Shah's book was a clearheaded call to arms, although written without alarmism. Schaub concluded that The Fever was an essential read.

Kirkus Reviews wrote that Shah's treatment of malaria argued that the disease was in control, rather than humans. The review called the book a "sad, sobering account" that nevertheless had important implications, particularly for policymakers.
