= Younghill Kang =

Korean-American novelist (1898–1972)

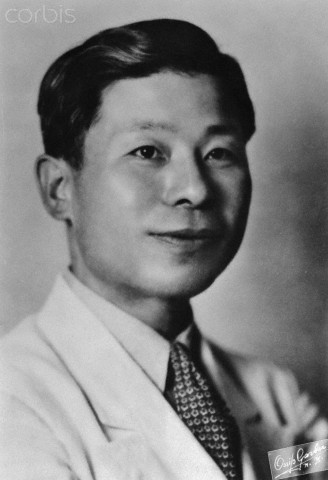
- Born: June 5, 1898 (May 10 in a lunisolar calendar); Hongwon, South Hamgyong Province, Joseon
- Died: December 2, 1972; Satellite Beach, Florida, United States
- Occupations: Author, lecturer
- Writing career
- Period: 1930s
- Notable works: The Grass Roof; East Goes West

- Younghill Kang
- Hangul: 강용흘
- Hanja: 姜龍訖
- RR: Gang Yongheul
- MR: Kang Yonghŭl

Younghill Kang (Korean: 강용흘; June 5, 1898 – December 2, 1972) was a Korean-American writer. He is best known for his 1931 novel The Grass Roof (the first Korean American novel) and its sequel, the 1937 fictionalized memoir East Goes West: The Making of an Oriental Yankee. He also wrote an unpublished play, Murder in the Royal Palace, which was performed both in the US and in Korea. Kang's antipathy for Syngman Rhee was said to have influenced the book's framing. He has been called "the father of Korean American literature."

== Early life and education ==
As a child in Korea, Kang was educated in both Confucian and Christian missionary schools. In 1921, he fled Korea because of his participation in the Korean independence movement; he went first to Canada (where he briefly studied at Dalhousie University), then to the United States. He received his B.S. from Boston University in 1925 and an Ed.M. in English education from Harvard University in 1927.

== Work ==
Kang at first wrote in Korean and Japanese, switching to English only in 1928 under the tutelage of his American wife, Frances Keeley. He worked as an editor for the Encyclopædia Britannica and taught at New York University, where his colleague Thomas Wolfe read the opening chapters of his novel The Grass Roof and recommended it to the publisher Scribner's. The book was admired by such other authors as Rebecca West and H. G. Wells, and was considered for a movie adaptation by Hollywood. The Grass Roof was well received in its time, since it seemed to confirm American disdain for Korea. East Goes West, however, criticized the United States and therefore was less popular until the multicultural movement gave it renewed attention.

In addition to The Grass Roof and East Goes West, Kang translated Korean literature into English and reviewed books for The New York Times. Kang also traveled in Europe for two years on a Guggenheim Fellowship, curated at the Metropolitan Museum of Art, and worked as an Asian expert for the U.S. government in both the U.S. Military Office of Publications and the Corps Office of Civil Information.

Kang received the Halperine Kaminsky Prize, the 1953 Louis S. Weiss Memorial Prize, and an honorary doctorate from Koryo University.

== The Grass Roof ==
The Grass Roof uses the character of Chungpa Han to depict Kang's life in Korea and to explain his decision to leave. Han chooses to leave Korea rather than join the popular resistance movement fighting for independence from the Japanese. He has been influenced by Western literature and prefers the promises of individualism in the West to the mass movements, nationalism, and emphasis on family connections that he sees in a Korea he believes is dying.

== East Goes West ==
East Goes West continues the story of Han (standing in for Kang) and his life in the United States, where he notices how involved his fellow immigrants are in Korean independence and how much they hope to return to their native land. His distance from his fellow immigrants increases his sense of loneliness in his new country. Moreover, his hopes for a new life in the West are never realized, as his dreams exceed the reality of American opportunity at that time. He befriends two other Koreans—Jum and Kim—who are also interested in becoming truly American, but they too have never been able to enter fully into American society. He hopes that furthering his schooling will be the solution, but even a scholarship to college does not solve his problems. As the novel ends, Han has found most of his dreams dashed, except for the Buddhist hope of a life beyond this one.

== Critical studies ==
1. Jeon, Joseph J. "Koreans in Exile: Younghill Kang and Richard E. Kim." IN: Srikanth and Song, The Cambridge History of Asian American Literature. Cambridge: Cambridge University Press; 2015. pp. 123–138.
2. Roh, David. "Scientific Management in Younghill Kang’s East Goes West: The Japanese and American Construction of Korean Labor.” MELUS: Multi-Ethnic Literatures of the United States 37.1 (2012): 83-104.
3. Kuo, Karen J. Lost Imaginaries: Images of Asia in America, 1924-1942. Dissertation, U of Washington, 2006.
4. Szmanko, Klara. "America Is in the Head and on the Ground: Confronting and (Re-)Constructing 'America' in Three Asian American Narratives of the 1930s." Interactions: Aegean Journal of English and American Studies/Ege Ingiliz ve Amerikan Incelemeleri Dergisi, 2006 Fall; 15 (2): 113-23.
5. Sorensen, Leif. "Re-Scripting the Korean-American Subject: Constructions of Authorship in New Il Han and Younghill Kang." Genre, 2006; 39 (3): 141-156.
6. Lee, A. Robert. "Younghill Kang" IN: Madsen, Asian American Writers. Detroit, MI: Gale; 2005. pp. 159–62
7. Knadler, Stephen. "Unacquiring Negrophobia: Younghill Kang and Cosmopolitan Resistance to the Black and White Logic of Naturalization." IN: Lawrence and Cheung, Recovered Legacies: Authority and Identity in Early Asian American Literature. Philadelphia, PA: Temple UP; 2005. pp. 98–119
8. Todorova, Kremena Tochkova. "An Enlargement of Vision": Modernity, Immigration, and the City in Novels of the 1930s. Dissertation, U of Notre Dame, 2003.
9. Oh, Sandra Si Yun. Martyrdom in Korean American Literature: Resistance and Paradox in East Goes West, Quiet Odyssey, Comfort Woman and Dictee. Dissertation, U of California, Berkeley, 2001.
10. Lee, Kun Jong. "The African-American Presence in Younghill Kang's East Goes West." CLA Journal, 2002 Mar; 45 (3): 329-59.
11. Lew, Walter K. "Grafts, Transplants, Translation: The Americanizing of Younghill Kang." IN: Scandura and Thurston, Modernism, Inc.: Body, Memory, Capital. New York, NY: New York UP; 2001. pp. 171–90
12. Knadler, Stephen. "Unacquiring Negrophobia: Younghill Kang and the Cosmopolitan Resistance to the Black and White Logic of Naturalization." Jouvert: A Journal of Postcolonial Studies, 2000 Spring-Summer; 4 (3): 37 paragraphs.
13. Livingston, James. "Younghill Kang (1903- )." IN: Nelson, Asian American Novelists: A Bio-Bibliographical Critical Sourcebook. Westport, CT: Greenwood; 2000. pp. 127–31
14. Huh, Joonok. "'Strangest Chorale': New York City in East Goes West and Native Speaker." IN: Wright and Kaplan, The Image of the Twentieth Century in Literature, Media, and Society. Pueblo, CO: Society for the Interdisciplinary Study of Social Imagery, University of Southern Colorado; 2000. pp. 419–22
15. Kim, Joanne H. "Mediating Selves: Younghill Kang's Balancing Act." Hitting Critical Mass: A Journal of Asian American Cultural Criticism, 1999 Fall; 6 (1): 51-59.
16. Lew, Walter K. "Before The Grass Roof: Younghill Kang's University Days." "Korean American Fiction" special issue of Korean Culture 12.1 (Spring 1998): 22-29.
17. Strange, David. "Thomas Wolfe's Korean Connection." The Thomas Wolfe Review, 1994 Spring; 18 (1): 36-41.
18. Lee, Kyhan. "Younghill Kang and the Genesis of Korean-American Literature." Korea Journal, 1991 Winter; 31 (4): 63-78.

== See also ==
- List of Korean novelists
- List of Asian American writers
- List of Korean Americans
- Korean American writers
