= Ronyoung Kim =

American novelist

- Born: Gloria Jane Kim; March 28, 1926; Los Angeles, California
- Died: February 1987 (aged 60)
- Writing career
- Notable work: Clay Walls

Ronyoung Kim (March 28, 1926 – February 1987), aka Kim Ronyoung, was the pen name of Gloria Hahn, a Korean American writer. She was born and raised to Korean immigrants in Los Angeles's Koreatown and died not long after finishing Clay Walls (1987), a Pulitzer Prize-nominated novel about a Korean family that leaves Japanese-occupied Korea in the 1920s to live in the United States that was "the first major novel to illustrate the experiences of Korean immigrants and Korean Americans in the United States".

== Clay Walls ==
This novel about an immigrant family and their life in California from the 1910s to the 1940s. It is divided into three parts: The first focuses on the mother, the aristocratic Haesu; the second, on the father, Chun, who is from a farming background; and the third on their American-born daughter, Faye. Chun and Haesu had fled to the United States after Korea was annexed by Japan in 1910, but find their relationship difficult in the States, due partly to American racial discrimination but due also to the class differences between them. Haesu grows more involved with the immigrant community's work for the Korean independence movement and dislikes Chun's patriarchal attitudes; but Chun feels that Haesu cannot adapt to their new situation and that she doesn't appreciate his work supporting the family. While Haesu and their children visit Korea, Chun loses the family business; he becomes addicted to gambling, abandons the family and eventually is found dead in Nevada. Haesu takes a job to support her family and eventually sells off a piece of land in Korea she was using to connect her to Korea. Faye grows up knowing only the States; her brothers and male friends join the military after the attack on Pearl Harbor, and at the end of the novel, she is being courted by a Korean medical student from Yale.

Kim began the novel after being diagnosed with breast cancer in 1976 and based it partly on the experiences of her parents: her father came from a peasant background and her mother was an aristocrat who participated in the Korean-independence movement in the States. The novel focuses both on key aspects of Korean-American life during World War II (including living conditions, Korean nationalism and the government's mistaken treatment of Koreans as "Japanese citizens" after Pearl Harbor) and on the asymmetry of race, gender and class relationships in both Korean and U.S. cultures.

== See also ==
- List of Korean American writers
- List of Asian American writers
