= Gus Lee =

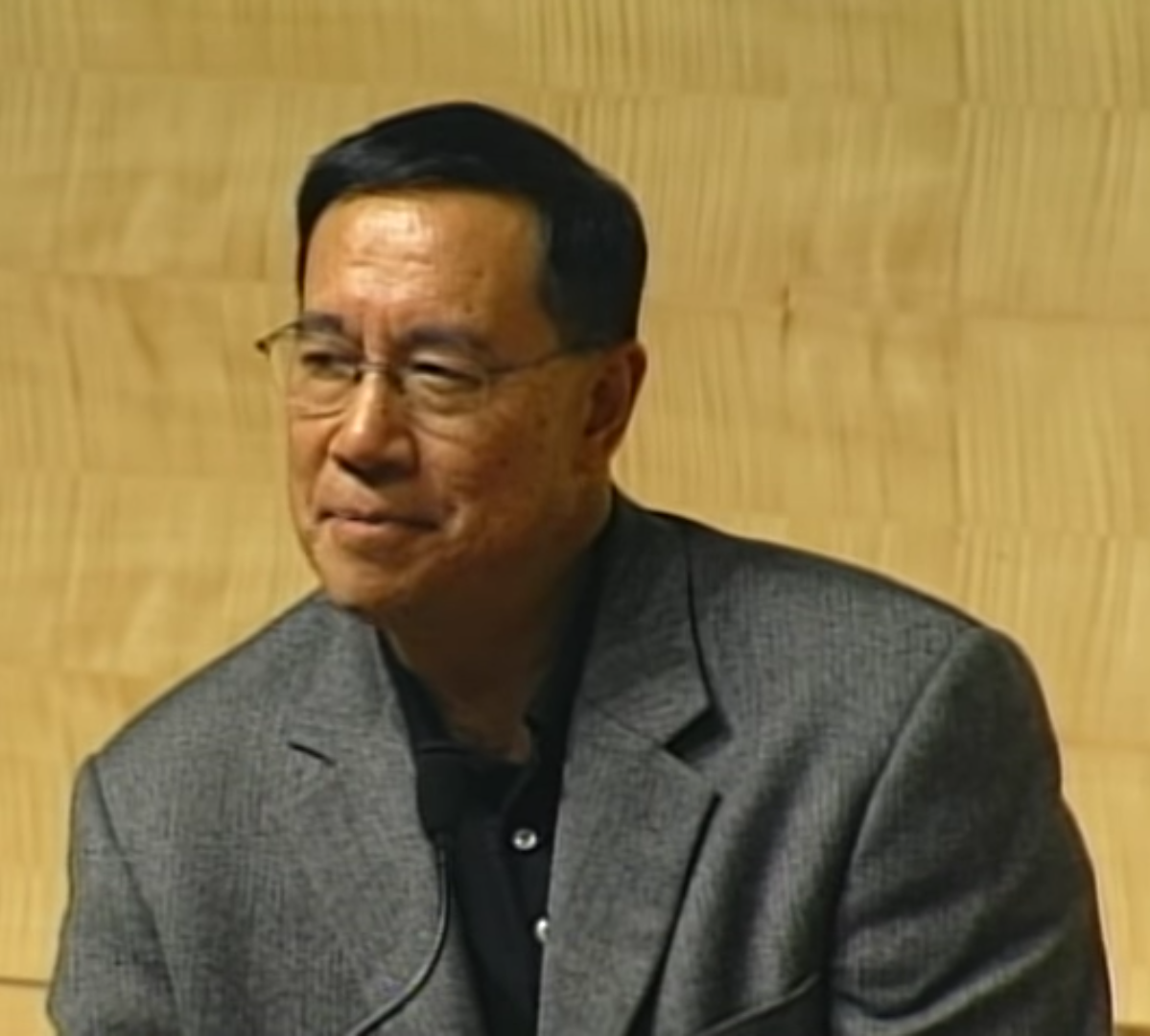
- Born: Augustus Samuel Mein-Sun Lee; August 8, 1946 (age 80); San Francisco, California, U.S.
- Education: University of California, Davis (BA, JD)
- Occupations: Lawyer, Writer
- Spouse: Diane Elliott
- Military Service
- Allegiance: United States
- Branch: United States Army
- Service years: 1977–1980
- Rank: Captain
- Unit: J.A.G. Corps

Augustus Samuel Mein-Sun "Gus" Lee (born August 8, 1946) is an American author and ethicist. He was born in San Francisco, a place he recounts in his childhood memoir/novel China Boy (1991) about growing up in a broken, poverty-stricken immigrant family in an inner city ghetto.

Lee attended the U.S. Military Academy at West Point, did graduate study in East Asian History with Liu Kwangching and obtained a J.D. degree from the University of California, Davis School of Law (King Hall). While a graduate and law student at Davis, Lee served as an Assistant Dean of Students for the Educational Opportunity Program, project coordinator for Asian American Studies and ROTC Brigade Commander. He was an Army boxer, Army drill sergeant, paratrooper, Command Judge Advocate, U.S. Senate ethics investigator and legal adviser to the worldwide Connelly Investigation with tours in Asia. He became a multiple-event whistle blower, which involuntarily launched him into his work as an ethicist and character-based leadership consultant.

Lee worked as supervising deputy district attorney, acting deputy attorney general, FBI and law enforcement trainer, Deputy Director of the California District Attorneys Association. He was an adjunct leadership instructor at USC.

Lee recounts his life in autobiographical fiction. A challenging childhood in San Francisco's Panhandle is the subject of his book China Boy (1991), which became San Francisco's first One City One Book selection and a Colorado Springs' Pikes Peak Reads selection. Honor and Duty (1994) describes the tension between integrity, friendship and fidelity in an autobiographical tale about West Point. Tiger's Tail (1996) recounts Lee's role as an Army criminal investigator pursuing enemy secret agents, man-carried atomic devices and shaman prophets on the Korean DMZ. No Physical Evidence (2000) is a legal thriller that recounts a difficult trial as a deputy DA, involving a vulnerable teenage victim and a sociopathic child abuser, and recounts the simultaneous loss of their first daughter. Lee followed with a memoir, Chasing Hepburn (2004), in which his mother and three young sisters conduct a harrowing flight from wartime China to America. His 2007 book Courage: The Backbone of Leadership describes the measurable behaviors of integrity and courage. He has contributed to anthologies, written for Time and Encyclopædia Britannica and written op-eds. The death of his West Point mentor, General H. Norman Schwarzkopf caused him to write With Schwarzkopf: Life Lessons of the Bear (2015), which recalls their relationship.

== Bibliography ==
- With Schwarzkopf: Life Lessons of The Bear (Non-Fiction) (2015) ISBN 978-1588345295
- Courage: The Backbone of Leadership (Business Non-Fiction) (2006) ISBN 978-0-7879-8137-2
- Chasing Hepburn (Non-Fiction) (2004)
- No Physical Evidence (2000)
- Tiger's Tail (1996)
- Honor and Duty (1994)
- China Boy (1991)

== See also ==
- List of Asian American writers
