= Beyond the Cayenne Wall =

Beyond the Cayenne Wall is a collection of stories by Shaila Abdullah about Pakistani women struggling to find their individualities despite the barriers imposed by society. Beyond the wall lie women of or from Pakistan, a region of shifting boundaries, who are eternally challenged by the looming traditional wall that separates the acceptable from the sinful. It captures the cultural chasm (and, sometimes, the collision between the East and the West), as the characters dare to go beyond the wall that divides their traditions and the world outside.

The characters draw the reader into their stories through their heartbreaking situations and inspiring decisions. Tannu is asked to give up her firstborn child to the caretakers of the temple of Shah Daullah in order to uphold the tradition of sacrifice. Dhool is a defiant, spirited woman who confronts the five mistakes in her life and ventures out among the wolves in human clothing to make the lives of her children better. In a striking account of alienation and the clash of two worlds, Mansi, a young mother, returns to her native land to bring her widowed mother back to live with her brother in the United States.

In these (and several other) stories, Abdullah weaves together a collection of events that spin around betrayals, confessions, lost opportunities, misunderstandings, revenge, acceptance, and denial, shaken in with exotic spices and flavor, a potpourri for the senses.
