= The Barbarians are Coming =

2000 novel by David Wong Louie

- Cover photo of the Penguin paperback edition
- Author: David Wong Louie
- Language: English
- Subject: Chinese Americans fiction, Black humor
- Genre: novel
- Published: G.P. Putnam's Sons, 2000
- Publication place: United States
- Pages: 372
- Awards: Shirley Collier Prize
- ISBN: 9780399146039
- OCLC: 41606328

The Barbarians are Coming is a novel by David Wong Louie.

The novel tells the story of a Chinese American man trying to make it in the United States while dealing with his immigrant parents and their desires for their son.

The book was released in 2000 by G.P. Putnam's Sons, and received positive reviews from Publishers Weekly, The Los Angeles Times Book Review, San Francisco Chronicle, and Ploughshares.

== Bibliography ==
- The Barbarians Are Coming: A Novel, G.P. Putnam's Sons, 2000, ISBN 9780399146039
