= David Wong Louie =

American novelist

- Born: December 20, 1954; Rockville Centre, New York, U.S.
- Died: September 19, 2018 (aged 63)
- Education: East Meadow High School
- Alma mater: University of Iowa
- Writing career
- Genres: novel, short story
- Notable works: Pangs of Love; The Barbarians Are Coming
- Notable awards: First Fiction Award from Los Angeles Times and from Ploughshares; John C. Zacharis First Book Award; UCLA's Shirley Collier Prize

David Wong Louie (Chinese: 雷祖威; pinyin: Léi Zǔwēi; December 20, 1954 – September 19, 2018) was a Chinese-American novelist and short story writer.

== Life and career ==
Born in Rockville Centre, New York, Louie graduated from East Meadow High School in 1973, as "one of the few Asian-Americans" in the school. He received an M.F.A. (Master of Fine Arts) in Creative Writing from the University of Iowa in 1981 and an A.B. from Vassar College in 1977. He taught at Vassar College and the University of California, Los Angeles.

Louie's short story collection, Pangs of Love received the 1991 First Fiction Award from the Los Angeles Times and the John C. Zacharis First Book Award from Ploughshares. It was also named a Notable Book by The New York Times and a Voice Literary Supplement Favorite. The Barbarians are Coming won the Shirley Collier Prize.

In 2001, he was awarded a Lannan Literary Fellowship. He has also had a fellowship with the National Foundation for the Advancement of Arts.

His short story "Displacement" was included in 100 Years of the Best American Short Stories, Houghton Mifflin Harcourt October 6, 2015.

Louie's essay "Eat, Memory," on his experience living with throat cancer, receiving a tracheostomy tube, and using a G-tube for six years, was originally published in Harper's Magazine in August 2017. The essay was included in Best American Essays 2018, edited by Hilton Als. Louie died due to throat cancer on September 19, 2018.

== Works ==
- Pangs of Love: stories. Knopf. 1991. ISBN 978-0-394-58957-2.
- The Barbarians are Coming. G.P. Putnam's Sons. 2000. ISBN 978-0-399-14603-9.
- A Contemporary Asian American Anthology with Marilyn Chin.

=== Anthologies ===
- Terrell Dixon, ed. (2002). "Bottles of Beaujolais". City wilds: essays and stories about urban nature. University of Georgia Press. ISBN 978-0-8203-2339-8.

== See also ==
- List of Asian American writers

== Critical studies ==
from March 2008:

1. Caucasian Partners and Generational Conflicts-David Wong Louie's Pangs of Love By: Wen-ching Ho, EurAmerica: A Journal of European and American Studies, 2004 June; 34 (2): 231–64. (In Chinese)
2. 'The Most Outrageous Masquerade': Queering Asian-American Masculinity By: Crystal Parikh, MFS: Modern Fiction Studies, 2002 Winter; 48 (4): 858–98. (journal article)
3. Toward a More Worldly World Series: Reading Game Three of the 1998 American League Championship and David Wong Louie's 'Warming Trends' By: Jeff Partridge, American Studies International, 2000 June; 38 (2): 115–25. (journal article)
4. Stacey Yukari Hirose (2000). Words Matter: Conversations with Asian American Writers. Honolulu, HI: University of Hawaii Press. pp. 189–214. ISBN 9780824822163.
5. Saddle; Zyzzyva, 1999 Winter; 15 (3): 116–21.
6. Chinese/Asian American Men in the 1990s: Displacement, Impersonation, Paternity, and Extinction in David Wong Louie's Pangs of Love By: Sau-ling Cynthia Wong. IN: Okihiro, Alquizola, Rony and Wong, Privileging Positions: The Sites of Asian American Studies. Pullman: Washington State UP; 1995. pp. 181–91
7. Cynthia Kadohata and David Wong Louie: The Pangs of a Floating World By: Sheila Sarkar; Hitting Critical Mass: A Journal of Asian American Cultural Criticism, 1994 Winter; 2 (1): 79–97.
8. Affirmations: Speaking the Self into Being By: Manini Samarth; Parnassus: Poetry in Review, 1992; 17 (1): 88–101.
