= Margaret Dilloway =

Japanese American author

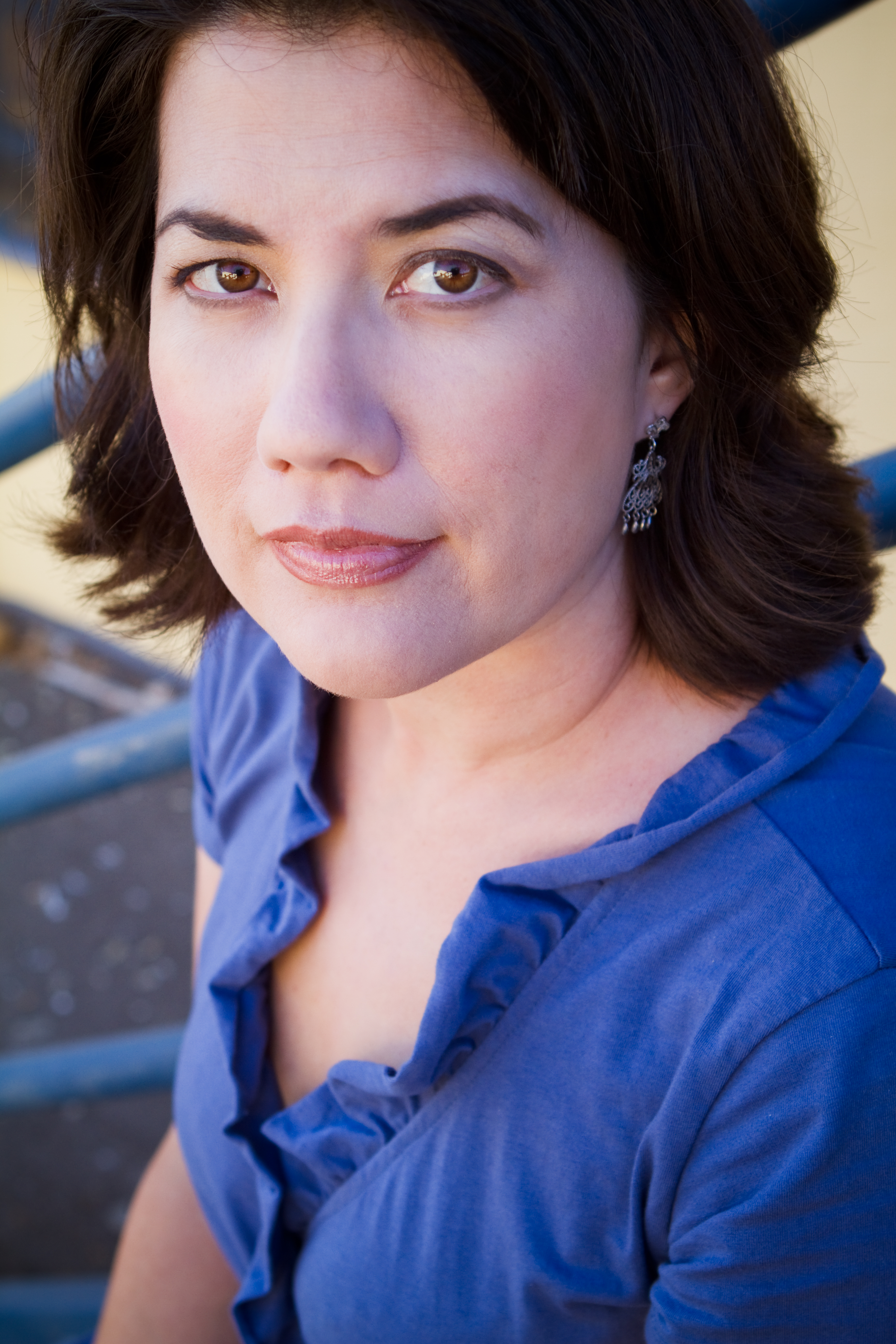
- Margaret Dilloway
- Website: http://www.margaretdilloway.com

Margaret Dilloway is a Japanese American author best known for her novels How To Be An American Housewife and The Care And Handling Of Roses With Thorns.

== Biography ==
Margaret Dilloway was born in San Diego, California to a Japanese mother and American father. She grew up in San Diego and has lived in Washington, Hawaii, and San Diego, California as an adult. She attended Scripps College in Claremont, California, earning a Studio Art B.A. She has three children.

== Career ==
How To Be An American Housewife was published by Putnam Books in 2010 and reprinted in paperback in 2011. It received positive reviews, including four stars from People magazine.

Her second novel, The Care And Handling Of Roses With Thorns was published by Putnam in August 2012. The book won the American Library Association Reference and User Services Association 2012 award in Women's Fiction.

Her third book Sisters of Heart and Snow was published in 2015 by Penguin, with narratives alternating between current-day Japanese American sisters and 12th century female samurai Tomoe Gozen .

Middle grade fantasy: MOMOTARO: XANDER AND THE LOST ISLAND OF MONSTERS and MOMOTARO: XANDER AND THE DREAM THIEF were published by Disney-Hyperion and then bought by Balzer + Bray, and optioned by Fox Animation for a feature film.

Middle grade contemporary, published by Balzer + Bray (HarperCollins): SUMMER OF A THOUSAND PIES, FIVE THINGS ABOUT AVA ANDREWS, and WHERE THE SKY LIVES.

In 2020, Margaret was the Zion National Park Artist-in-Residence in February, living there for a month right before the quarantine hit. There she wrote WHERE THE SKY LIVES, which takes place in Zion.

== Honors and awards ==
- Christopher Award, FIVE THINGS ABOUT AVA ANDREWS, 2021
- Children's Literature Council of Southern California Excellence in a Work of Juvenile Fiction, SUMMER OF A THOUSAND PIES, 2020
- American Library Association Asian/Pacific American Librarians Honor Award, MOMOTARO: XANDER AND THE LOST ISLAND OF MONSTERS, 2017
- American Library Association Literary Tastes Award for Best Women's Fiction, THE CARE AND HANDLING OF ROSES WITH THORNS, 2013
- John Gardner Fiction Award Finalist, 2011
- Indie NEXT List Pick, 2010

== Bibliography ==
- Dilloway, Margaret (2010). How to Be an American Housewife. United States: Putnam. ISBN 978-0-399-15637-3.
- Dilloway, Margaret (2012). The Care and Handling of Roses with Thorns. United States: Putnam. ISBN 978-0399157752.
- Walton, Todd (2013). Spark: A Creative Anthology. United States: Empire & Great Jones Little Press. ISBN 978-0988807211. Contributing author.
- Dilloway, Margaret (2015). Sisters of Heart and Snow. G.P. Putnam's Sons. ISBN 9780399170805.Dilloway, Margaret (2016). Momotaro: Xander and the Lost Island of Monsters. Little, Brown Readers. ISBN 978-1484746813.Dilloway, Margaret (2016). Momotaro: Xander and the Dream Thief. Little, Brown. ISBN 978-1484790076.
- "The Japanese Untouchables" http://www.huffingtonpost.com/margaret-dilloway/the-japanese-untouchables_b_697585.html
- "My Mother and the American Way" http://www.blogher.com/my-mother-and-american-way-housekeeping.

== See also ==
- List of Asian American writers
