= Sokunthary Svay =

Khmer-American musician

- Born: Sokunthary Svay; Thailand (refugee camp), Thailand
- Writing career
- Genre: Poetry

Sokunthary Svay is a Pushcart-nominated Khmer poet, writer and musician from the Bronx. She and her family were refugees from Cambodia who survived the genocidal Khmer Rouge regime. As of 2016, Svay is the poetry editor for Newtown Literary, and a founding member and Board President of the Cambodian American Literary Arts Association (CALAA). Svay was a subject in New York magazine’s “Living in a Sanctuary City” portfolio and featured in the New York Immigration Coalition's This is Our NY, broadcast in Times Square. She has been published in Women's Studies Quarterly, Prairie Schooner, LONTAR, and Mekong Review, Perigee, and Margins. She is a recipient of the American Opera Projects' Composer & the Voice Fellowship for 2017-2019. Her first poetry collection, Apsara in New York (Willow Books), was published in 2017 and had a debut at Poets House. Svay is the author of the memoir Put It On Record: A Memoir-Archive (2023).
