= Shaila Abdullah =

Pakistani–American author, writer, and designer (born 1971)

- Born: 1971 (age 54–55); Karachi, Pakistan
- Children: 2
- Writing career
- Genre: short stories
- Notable work: Saffron Dreams
- Notable awards: Patras Bukhari Award for English Language; Golden Quill Award

Shaila Abdullah (born 1971) is a Pakistani-American author, writer, and designer.

== Life ==
Shaila Abdullah has received the Patras Bukhari Award for English Language, the Golden Quill Award, the Reader Views Award, the Written Art Award, and a grant from Hobson Foundation. Beyond the Cayenne Wall received the Jury Prize for Outstanding Fiction which is the highest award in the Norumbega Fiction Awards.

Her books include Saffron Dreams, Beyond the Cayenne Wall and three children's books: Rani in Search of a Rainbow, My Friend Suhana, and A Manual for Marco. She has also written books for children with special needs.

In early 2014, a research team from Washington and Lee University conducted a study in which they found that reading a 3,000-word extract from Saffron Dreams can make a person less racist. The novel was cited as among the 50 Greatest Works of Immigration Literature by Open Education Database.

== Works ==
- Beyond the cayenne wall : collection of short stories, iUniverse, 2005. ISBN 9780595370092, OCLC 69671582
- Saffron dreams : a novel, Modern History Press, 2010. ISBN 9781615990252, OCLC 920296670
- My friend Suhana, Loving Healing Press, 2014. ISBN 9781615992119, OCLC 863854490
- A manual for Marco, Loving Healing Press 2015. ISBN 9781615992478, OCLC 886381624
