= Juliana Hu Pegues =

American poet

- Born: Taiwan
- Occupations: Writer, Performer, Community Activist, Academic
- Employer: Cornell University
- Known for: Asian American literature, performance art, community activism
- Notable work: White Rice: A Search for Identity, Immigrant Dictionary, Space-Time Colonialism: Alaska’s Indigenous and Asian Entanglements
- Title: Associate Professor, English Department
- Awards: Lora Romero First Book Publication Prize (2022), Sally and Ken Owens Award (2022), Playwright's Center Many Voices Fellow

Juliana Hu Pegues is an American writer, performer and community activist living in Minnesota.

== Biography ==
Hu Pegues was born in Taiwan and raised in Alaska, to a Chinese mother and American father. She has been a member of both the women of color theater group Mama Mosaic and Mango Tribe, a national Asian Pacific Islander American women's performance collective.

Her one-woman shows: Made In Taiwan, First the Forest, and Fifteen were presented respectively by the Walker Art Center, the Jerome Foundation Performance Art Commission, and Intermedia Arts. Her work has also been presented at the Pillsbury House Theater, and The Southern Theater. David Mura directed her play "Q and A" at Mixed Blood Theatre. Her poetry has been published in several anthologies and in the Asian American Renaissance Journal, Mizna, and Lodestar Quarterly. Her writings also include White Rice: A Search for Identity and pieces for the Fab Feminist Zine.

Her poetry has been featured at numerous open mics and cabarets across the country.

She has worked for such groups as Asian Immigrant Women Advocates, Women Against Military Madness, Asian American Renaissance, APLB (Asian Pacific Lesbians and Bisexuals)- Twin Cities, and the Women's Prison Book Project.

She is the author of the chapbook Immigrant Dictionary.

Pegues is the recipient of many awards and honors including a Playwright's Center Many Voices fellow, and hosted AARGH, the Asian American Cabaret with Sandy Agustin.

In 1993, she and performance artist Ken Choy were arrested for protesting a performance of Madame Butterfly at the Minnesota Opera. Both were charged with disorderly conduct and paid a $25 fine.

In 2021, she joined Cornell University's English Department as an associate Professor. Her research areas include Asian American studies, Native and Indigenous studies, women of color feminism, and queer of color critique.

Pegues is the author of “Space-Time Colonialism: Alaska’s Indigenous and Asian Entanglements,” published with University of North Carolina Press in June 2021. The book received the 2022 Lora Romero First Book Publication Prize and the 2022 Sally and Ken Owens Award.
