= Peter Bacho =

American writer

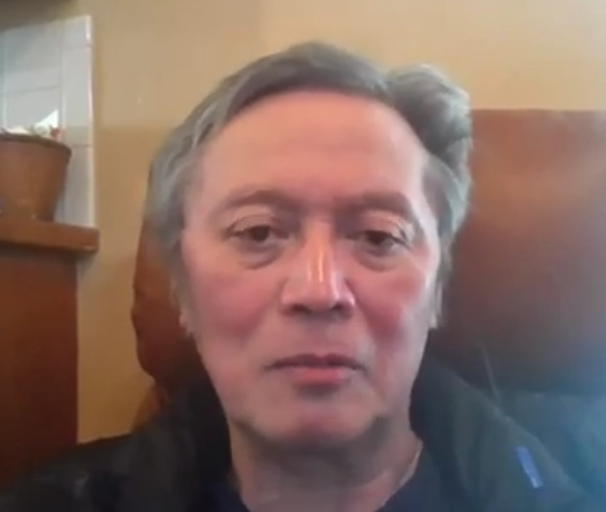
- In an online workshop in 2024
- Born: Seattle, Washington, US
- Occupation: Writer

Peter Bacho is a writer and teacher best known for his book Cebu which won the American Book Award. His book is defined as Filipino American literature because of its explorations in themes such as neocolonialism and Filipino-American identity.

== Early life and education ==
Bacho was raised in Seattle. His father was a field worker. He graduated in 1974.

== Career ==
Bacho also won the Washington Governor's Writers Award for Dark Blue Suit a collection of stories. Many of Bacho's books deal with the Filipino experience in the United States. He considers himself an "old Filipino writer". Bacho teaches in the Liberal Studies Program at The Evergreen State College, Tacoma Campus. He is also a lecturer in the Interdisciplinary Arts and Sciences program at the University of Washington Tacoma.

== Bibliography ==
- Cebu (novel, 1991)
- Dark Blue Suit (short stories, 1996)
- Boxing in Black and White (nonfiction, 1999)
- Nelson's Run (novel, 2002)
- Entrys (novel, 2005)
- Leaving Yesler (young adult novel, 2010)
