= Maliha Masood =

Pakistani-American writer

- Born: 1971 (age 54–55); Karachi, Pakistan
- Education: University of Washington, Tufts University, Harvard Kennedy School
- Writing career
- Language: English
- Subjects: Travel, Islamic studies, Women's studies
- Notable awards: Jack Straw writers forum, 2005
- Website: www.dizzyinkarachi.com

Maliha Masood is a Pakistani-American writer. She was born 1971 in Karachi, Pakistan. She moved to the United States in 1982 and grew up in Bellevue, Washington. Masood is a writer in creative nonfiction and the author of two travel memoirs, Zaatar Days, Henna Nights (Seal Press/2007). and Dizzy In Karachi (Booktrope Editions/2013).

== Early life and education ==
Masood was born in Karachi in 1971 and studied international business at the University of Washington and worked as a research analyst in the information technology sector for six years before turning towards writing.

Masood was a resident artist with Seattle Arts and Lectures Writers in the Schools Program during 2007 and a guest instructor in the Political Science Department at Edmonds Community College in the spring of 2009. Masood also provides workshops and seminars through her nonprofit collective, The Diwaan Project, a grassroots initiative on global affairs. She did her graduate studies at the Fletcher School, at Tufts University, and at Harvard Kennedy School at Harvard University, earning a master's degree in Law and Diplomacy in May 2004.

== Career ==
Selected for the Jack Straw Foundation writers forum in 2005, Masood's writings on women, culture and Islam have been featured in Al-Ahram, Asia Times, and the anthologies Voices of Resistance: Muslim Women on War, Faith and Sexuality, Waking up American and Bare your Soul: A Thinking Girl's Guide to Spirituality.

Masood appeared in and co-wrote a documentary film, Nazrah: A Muslim Woman's Perspective that aired on PBS. She was featured on the show Travel with Rick Steves on NPR.

Masood briefly worked in Pakistan at the International Crisis Group and the Human Rights Commission before moving back to the Pacific Northwest.
