= Lisa Changadveja =

American political strategist

- Born: Atlanta, Georgia, U.S.
- Occupation: Political Strategist
- Political party: Democratic

Lisa Changadveja is an American political strategist who has worked in multiple capacities on presidential campaigns for Hillary Clinton and at MoveOn. She is also an author and illustrator of four children's picture books, including Chang's First Songkran and The Only Girl on a Motorcycle.

== Background ==
Changadveja was born in Atlanta, Georgia and grew up in Helen, Georgia. She is the daughter of Thai immigrants. She volunteered for John Kerry's 2004 presidential campaign and worked on the successful 2006 reelection campaign for Oregon's then-governor Ted Kulongoski. In 2007, Changadveja temporarily withdrew from Brenau University Women's College to join Hillary Clinton's presidential campaign, where she mobilized voters in Nevada, Ohio, and Indiana as regional field director.

== Career ==
Changadveja served as deputy field director for Senator Michael Bennet's 2010 campaign before joining Planned Parenthood Federation of America in 2011 as Northwest Regional Field Manager. She then served as campaign manager for Ann Johnson's 2012 campaign for the Texas House of Representatives.

In 2013, Changadveja joined the Ready for Hillary super PAC as the LGBT Americans Director, a decision she called "personal." "We're here to encourage her to run in 2016 because she has the grassroots support behind her and she has the LGBT community behind her if and when she decides to run," she explained. "Hillary has been very active in the LGBT community and she's been a longtime friend. She was the first first lady to march in a Gay Pride parade." In this role she organized the PAC's LGBT fundraisers and presence at Pride festivals and LGBT conferences with the goal of getting information on 100,000 LGBT voters. She also served as AAPI Director for the super PAC. She also worked on Senator Mark Udall's 2014 campaign.

After Clinton announced her candidacy in 2015, Changadveja was named as AAPI Outreach Director for Hillary for America where she was instrumental in building the program to reach out to the Asian American-Pacific Islander electorate. She left the position as AAPI Outreach Director to join the Colorado Democratic Party as Coordinated Campaign Director in 2016. Jason Tengco succeeded her as AAPI Outreach Director after her departure.

== Personal life ==
Changadveja has been openly gay since she was a teenager. She has appeared on RuPaul's Drag Race All Stars, paired with Jessica Wild. She is a fan of science fiction.
