= Tulika Mehrotra =

American novelist and journalist

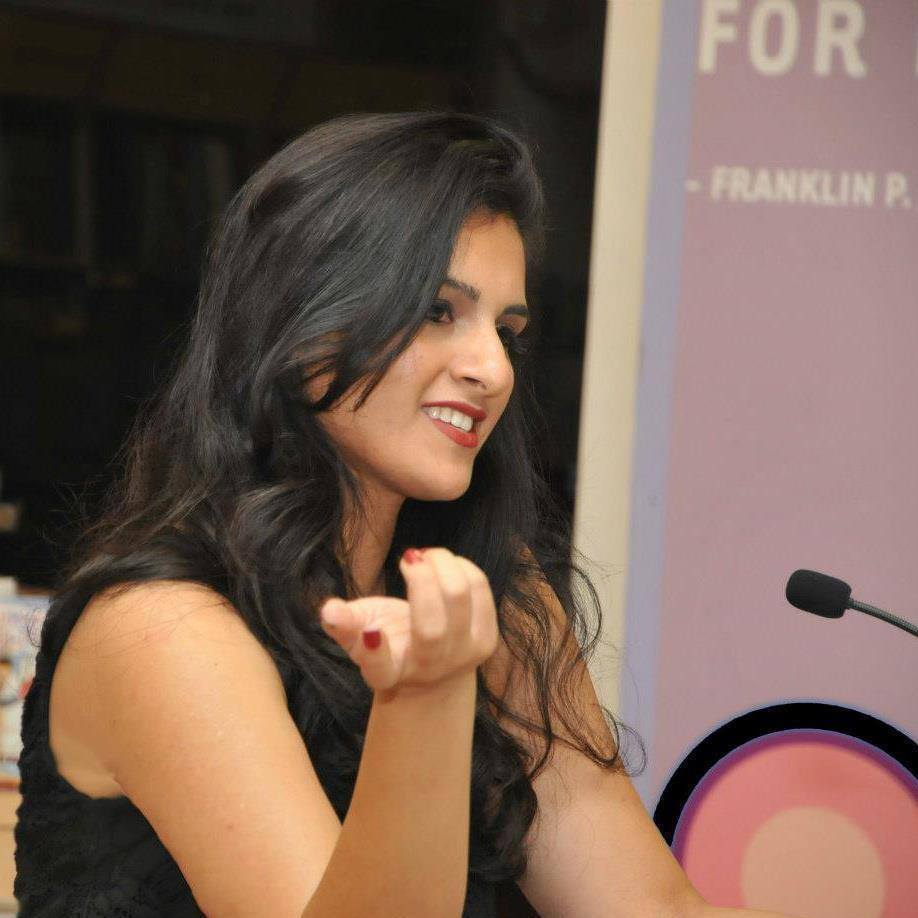
- Born: Lucknow, India
- Education: University of Illinois at Urbana–Champaign; European Institute of Design
- Occupations: Technology executive and author
- Writing career
- Notable works: Delhi Stopover, Crashing B-Town
- Website: tulikamehrotra.com.

Tulika Mehrotra is an American technology executive and author. Her novels Delhi Stopover and Crashing B-Town, published by Penguin Books, were bestsellers in India.

== Early life and education ==
Tulika Mehrotra is based in Chicago. She was born in Lucknow, Uttar Pradesh, India and is fluent in Hindi.

She received her bachelor's degree in finance from the University of Illinois at Urbana–Champaign During her undergraduate studies, she studied abroad at the University of Reading at the ICMA Business School in England.

For graduate studies, she attended the European Institute of Design (Italian: Istituto Europeo di Design) in Milan, Italy where she received her master's degree in fashion design. After completing her degree, she lived in Paris where she briefly studied French.

== Career ==
After a corporate career that began in the fashion industry in New York and transitioned to media in Los Angeles, Tulika focused her attention on writing. Her first two novels were published by Penguin Publishers.

Tulika has also written for various magazines including Harper's Bazaar, Elle, Vogue, Grazia, India Today and Men's Health.

Her debut novel Delhi Stopover was published in 2012 by Penguin Books India. Ridhima Sud, in Vogue India, wrote that the work contains "enough fashion in it for it to be considered chic, and plenty of satire for its literary cred." The sequel, Crashing B-Town was released the following year. Both titles became best sellers in India. The novels explore the cultural changes in modern India and within the youth generation using a backdrop of the fashion and film industries in Delhi and Mumbai.

== Personal life ==
Mehotra married Mohit Chopra in a Hindu ceremony on 25 January 2015, and a ceremony later that year at Arlington County Courthouse in Arlington County, Virginia.
