= Cecilia Hae-Jin Lee =

- Born: Lee, Hae-Jin; November 14, 1970 (age 55); Seoul, South Korea
- Occupations: writer, artist
- Spouse: Tim Maloney

Korean name
- Hangul: 이해진
- RR: I Haejin
- MR: I Haejin

Cecilia Hae-Jin Lee (born November 14, 1970) is an American writer, artist, photographer and chef. Lee is most known for her cookbooks and food writing. She was nominated for a James Beard award in 2006 and has won numerous other awards for her cookbooks. Lee has written for magazines, newspapers, and online publications. She also works as an artist in installation, photography, painting and drawing. Her work is displayed in many galleries and she created two public art pieces in California.

== Early life ==
Lee was born in Seoul, South Korea. She emigrated to the United States with her family in 1977. They first moved to Reading, Pennsylvania, and then to Los Angeles in 1978. She studied Biochemistry and Visual Arts (specifically painting, conceptual art and site-specific installation) at the University of California, San Diego. She decided against a medical career to pursue a life in the arts.

== Career ==
Lee was the owner and chef of Nabi, a fast-casual Korean restaurant in East Hollywood.

=== Writing ===
Lee has written cookbooks, travel guides and numerous magazine and newspaper articles. Her book, Eating Korean: from Barbecue to Kimchi, Recipes from My Home was chosen as the Best of the Best by Food and Wine magazine. Her second cookbook, Quick and Easy Korean Cooking, was chosen as the cookbook of the month by the now-defunct Gourmet magazine. The book was reviewed in the Christian Science Monitor noting both the recipes and the photographs. The New York Times reviewed the cookbook and one of her recipes was featured in the Times cooking section. The Los Angeles Times has written about her recipes.

Her cookbook, Quick and Easy Mexican Cooking featured in L.A. Weekly, and was nominated for the Gourmand World Cookbook awards.

Lee has written the first edition Frommer's South Korea travel guide and wrote two successive editions. She also authored the 1st edition of Frommer's Day by Day Seoul.

She has written and photographed for the Los Angeles Times since 1999. She is a freelance restaurant reviewer for the LA Times Daily Dish and contributed to a variety of other publications.

=== Artwork ===
She is also a painter, illustrator and a site-specific, conceptual and mixed media artist. She has created public art pieces for Pecan Park in Los Angeles and a memorial for Cesar Chavez at the University of Southern California (USC).

Her work has been exhibited in numerous galleries, including the musée de l'Elysée Lausanne in Switzerland, Galeria de la Historia de Concepción in Chile, Piazza Risorgimento in Italy, Galería Asociacion de Bancarios del Urugua, Centro Cultural de la Raza in Mexico, Museum of Contemporary Art in San Diego, Tacoma Art Museum, Scottsdale Center for the Arts, Neuberger Museum of Art, San Jose Museum of Art, Gallery 825, Artspace, Pierce College, Loyola Law School, Rita Dean, the Hatch Gallery and the Los Angeles Municipal Gallery at Barnsdall.

== Bibliography ==
- Eating Korean: From Barbecue to Kimchi, Recipes from My Home (Wiley 2005, ISBN 0-7645-4078-5)
- Best of the Best Volume 9: The Best Recipes from the 25 Best Cookbooks of the Year (Food + Wine 2006)
- Food + Wine Annual Cookbook: An Entire Year of Recipes (Food + Wine 2006)
- Eating Well Serves Two: 150 Healthy in a Hurry Recipes (Countryman 2006)
- Frommer's South Korea (Frommer's 2010, 2008, ISBN 0-470-59154-4)
- Quick and Easy Korean Cooking (Chronicle Books 2009, ISBN 0-8118-6146-5)
- Quick and Easy Mexican Cooking (Chronicle Books 2011, ISBN 0-8118-7232-7)
- Frommer's Day by Day Seoul (Frommer's 2011, ISBN 0-470-93144-2)

== Awards ==
- Gourmand World Cookbook Award nominee, 2010
- Gourmet cookbook of the month, June 2009
- Food & Wine's Best of the Best, 2006
- James Beard Award nominee, 2006
- President's Call to Service Award from the President's Council on Service and the Beyond the Bell branch of LAUSD 2004
- International Visual Artist of the Year Nomination, 2004
- Hedgebrook residency, 1999 and 2004
- Top 10 Recipes of the Year from Los Angeles Times, 1999 and 2000
