= Kim Sunée =

Korean American food writer

Kim Sunée (born South Korea) is an American memoirist and food writer, known for her 2008 memoir Trail of Crumbs: Hunger, Love, and the Search for Home, published by Grand Central Publishing which has also been translated into Korean, Hebrew and Chinese. She has also published two cookbooks, including Everyday Korean with co-author Seung-Hee Lee.

== Life ==
In 1973, three-year-old Sunée was abandoned by her mother in a South Korean market. She was adopted by a middle-class couple from New Orleans, Louisiana, where she "grew up in comfortable circumstances but with a growing sense of dislocation and restlessness". She has a sister who is also a South Korean adoptee. At 18, she traveled to Europe to study, first living in France and then Sweden.

=== Writing ===
Trail of Crumbs: Hunger, Love, and the Search for Home has received favorable reviews from publications such as the Chicago Tribune, the San Francisco Chronicle, and Epicurious.

She has been a food editor for several Time Warner publications and currently freelances for various publications. She currently resides in the United States.

She holds an MFA from Bennington Writing Seminars and serves on the National Council of Graywolf Press.

== Personal life ==
In Sweden in 1992, she met and entered into a long-term romantic relationship with Olivier Baussan, founder of the L'Occitane en Provence cosmetics company. Sunée's book tells about her life through her breakup with Baussan, interspersed with recipes.
