= How to Be an American Housewife =

2010 book by Margaret Dilloway

How To Be an American Housewife
- Author: Margaret Dilloway
- Language: English
- Genre: Chick lit Fiction
- Publisher: G. P. Putnam's Sons
- Publication date: 2010
- Publication place: United States
- ISBN: 978-0399156373

How To Be An American Housewife is a 2010 novel by Margaret Dilloway. It is based on the experiences of Dilloway's mother, who was a Japanese war bride.

== Synopsis ==
The book tells the story of Shoko Morgan, a mother of two and wife to American GI Charlie. Shoko decided to contact her brother Taro, whom she last saw when she married Charlie at the end of World War II. However, she is too ill to return her country. Shoko asked her daughter Sue and granddaughter to go to Japan to find her uncle to discover her mother's life secret.

== Awards ==
The book was a John Gardner Fiction Award Finalist in 2011.
