= Kah Kyung Cho =

Korean-American philosopher (1927–2022)

- Hangul: 조가경
- RR: Jo Gagyeong
- MR: Cho Kagyŏng

Kah Kyung Cho (Korean: 조가경; June 7, 1927 – January 15, 2022) was a Korean-American philosopher. He specialized in phenomenology, hermeneutics, contemporary German philosophy, and east–west comparative philosophy. He had worked with continental philosophers such as Martin Heidegger and Hans-Georg Gadamer. He taught at State University of New York (SUNY) from 1971 to 2017 and took retirement as a SUNY Distinguished Teaching Professor. Cho's seminars have traditionally centered on discussions anchored in close textual and hermeneutical readings of works in the phenomenological tradition, including Heidegger's Fundamental Concepts of Metaphysics, Being and Time, and Gadamer's Truth and Method.

== Education ==
Cho graduated from Seoul National University in South Korea in 1952, and then went to the University of Heidelberg in Germany to pursue a Ph.D., completing it in 1957.

== Career ==
Cho became a professor at SUNY in 1971, and since then has also served as a visiting professor at a number of institutions, including the University of Bochum in Germany and Osaka University in Japan. Dr. Cho was awarded the Fulbright Senior Research Professorship Award in 1961, the Alexander von Humboldt Foundation Research Grant in 1989, and 1997.

== Philosophy ==
In his attempt to bring Asian thought to the attention of Western readers, Cho adopted a markedly different approach from that of Japanese philosophers, as Landgrebe pointed out. While most Japanese are used to relying on their own Zen Buddhist tradition as the basis for assimilating Western philosophy, Cho appealed to more original Chinese sources of Taoism and Neo-Confucianism in order to implement a much wider ranging conversation between the two traditions. The most important tool for this cross cultural research, for Cho, is Husserl's phenomenology. It is significant not only for its methodical thrust into the depth dimension of conscious and subconscious experience. Phenomenology provides, as Cho often emphasizes, the purest "optical instrument" with built-in possibilities for self-correction. If philosophy is in its essence the pursuit of self-knowledge, then the objectives for Asian philosophers are clearly mapped from the beginning. They are called upon to turn to their own traditions and engage their Western colleagues in conversations based on what they can positively contribute to sharing a higher and better level of knowledge.

== Selected publications ==
The following is a partial list of publications by Kah-Kyung Cho.

- Philosophy and Science in Phenomenological Perspective (ed.), Phaenomenologica 95, Dordrecht 1984
- Bewusstsein und Natursein, Phänomenologischer West-Ost Diwan, Freiburg 1987 (Japanese translation, 1994)
- Phänomenologie der Natur (ed.), Freiburg, 1999
- Phänomenologie in Korea (ed.), Freiburg, 2001

== See also ==
- American philosophy
- List of American philosophers
