= Cebu (novel) =

1991 novel by Peter Bacho

- First edition
- Author: Peter Bacho
- Language: English
- Publisher: University of Washington Press
- Publication date: November 1991
- Publication place: United States
- Media type: Print (hardback & paperback)
- Pages: 205 pp
- ISBN: 978-0-295-97113-1
- OCLC: 23143902
- Dewey Decimal: 813/.54 20
- LC Class: PS3552.A2573 C4 1991

Cebu is a 1991 first novel by Filipino American author Peter Reme Bacho the "most visible figure" of second-generation, native-born Filipino American writing and one of several Seattle novelists in the 1990s to explore the racial history and sociology of Seattle. The novel is also "the first novel about a Filipino American who identifies primarily with US localities," rather than with the Philippines.

== Plot summary ==
The story follows Ben Lucero, an American priest of Filipino descent, who travels to the Philippines for the first time following the death of his mother in 1983. Ben accompanies her body to Cebu for burial, where he stays with his mother’s lifelong friend, Clara Natividad. Clara, once a guerrilla fighter during World War II, has since become a wealthy businesswoman, though her fortune is marked by morally ambiguous decisions.

In Cebu and Manila, Ben navigates Philippine culture, family history, and political unrest. He witnesses both the richness of local traditions and the violence surrounding U.S. influence, including a protest at the U.S. Embassy in Manila that turns deadly. During his stay, he spends time with Clara’s assistant, Ellen, reflecting on the ethical and cultural tensions he encounters.

Returning to Seattle, Ben faces challenges within the Filipino immigrant community, confronting cycles of violence and social conflict. He struggles to reconcile his identity as both Filipino and American, feeling like an outsider in both contexts.

Structure

- Prologue: Ben’s arrival in the Philippines and reunion with Aunt Clara.
- Part 1: Clara’s friendship with Ben’s mother, Remedios; Clara’s experiences during the Japanese occupation; Remedios’ marriage to Albert and migration to the U.S.
- Part 2: The story of Carlito, a friend of Clara’s, and his personal sacrifices; additional details about Clara’s wartime past.
- Part 3: The revelation of Carlito’s actions and their impact.
- Part 4: Ben’s time in Manila with Ellen as he prepares to return to the U.S.
- Part 5: Ben’s return to Seattle, his priestly duties, and engagement with ongoing violence in the immigrant community.

== Characters in "Cebu" ==
- Ben Lucero
- Remedios Lucero
- Albert Lucero

=== In the Philippines ===
- "Aunt" Clara Natividad
- Ellen Labrado
- Marites
- Carlito
- Sitoy

=== In Seattle ===
- Teddy
- Johnny Romero: a local cop who works in Ben's section of town; he is half-Filipino and half-Native American, and although he is raised Filipino, he uses his Native American ancestry to get a college degree and government money; he illustrates the impossibility of pinning minorities to either "Filipino" or "white," and he exemplifies the ways minority groups get ranked in a hierarchy of importance and/or respect
- Carmen "Zorro" Gamboa: a Mexican girl who moves into Ben's neighborhood while they are still in school; Teddy calls her Zorro because she has facial hair, and the nickname becomes popular with the schoolkids; only Ben is friendly with her, but she is upset to find out that he is not romantically interested in her; when she dies a few months later after getting involved with a "bad crowd," Ben blames himself until he finds out that she came from a bad home and was all but destined for a bad life.

== Major themes ==
The novel features themes around the differences between American and Philippine culture and between American and Philippine Roman Catholicism. Other themes covered include the history of the Philippines from the final days of World War II, the effect of American presence in the country, and the difference between American-born Filipinos and Filipino immigrants and neocolonialism. The Philippine concept of "barkada", a notion of loyalty to one's peer group, plays an important role in his experiences in Seattle after his return. The novel follows the protagonist's sexual repression and bifurcated notion of home. Bacho’s vision is darkly comic, and he refuses to sentimentalize this demanding material. Ben’s return to his homeland ends with a reaffirmation of his Filipino American identity

== Literary significance and reception ==
It is often discussed in scholarly surveys of Filipino American literature, alongside such seminal works as Carlos Bulosan's America Is in the Heart and Jessica Hagedorn's Dogeaters.

== Allusions and references ==
=== Allusions to actual history, geography and current science ===
Besides the descriptions of life in Cebu City and Manila, the novel refers to the general history of the Philippines from the time of Japanese control to the beginning of the revolt against the Marcos regime, including the student protests at American Embassy in 1970.

== Awards and nominations ==
The novel won the American Book Award from the Before Columbus Foundation in 1992.

== Publication history ==
- 1991, USA, U of Washington P ISBN 978-0-295-97113-1, Pub date November 1991, hardback and paperback
