= Matthew J. Baek =

American writer

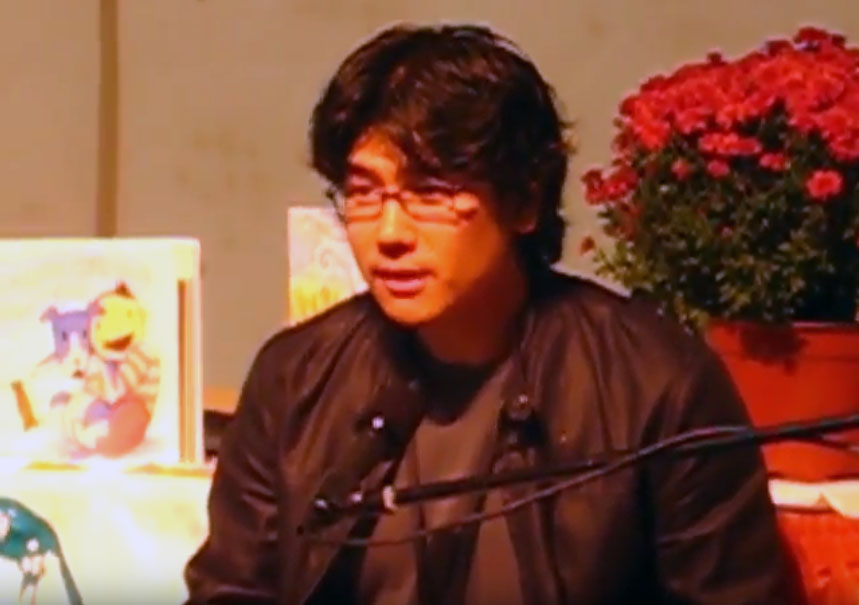
- Baek speaking at the Baltimore Book Festival
- Born: 25 November 1971 (age 54) Seoul, South Korea
- Education: Maryland Institute College of Art (BFA)

Website
- matthewjbaek.com

Matthew J. Baek (born 25 November 1971) is a Korean-American illustrator, children's book author, and graphic designer working as a government contractor for USAID. His illustrations have appeared in publications, both nationally and internationally.

Baek was born in Seoul, South Korea on 25 November 1971. He moved to the U.S. in 1981. He later attended the Parsons School of Design and the Maryland Institute College of Art, receiving a Bachelor of Fine Arts from the latter.

Baek has authored six books and illustrated two. He illustrated his first book, In God's Hands, in 2005. In 2006, Booklist named In God's Hands one of the year's "Top 10 Religion and Spirituality Books for Youth". Baek published his first book, Be Gentle with the Dog, Dear!, with Dial Books in 2008. Baek is also the author of Panda & Polar Bear (2009), which is a Junior Library Guild selection.

== Books ==
=== As author and illustrator ===
- Be Gentle with the Dog, Dear!. Dial Books. 2008. ISBN 978-0-8037-3250-6.
- Panda and Polar Bear. Dial Books. 2009. ISBN 978-0-8037-3359-6.
- Poonya the Red Panda, 2015.
- Pinecone's First Snow, 2015.
- I Am a Cat, 2016.
- Long Eared Bunny, 2016.

=== As illustrator ===
- Kushner, Lawrence; Schmidt, Gary (2005). In God's Hands. Jewish Lights Publishing. ISBN 978-1-58023-224-1.
- Eissler, Trevor (2012). N is for North Korea. Sevenoff. ISBN 978-0-982-28332-5.
