= Dilruba Ahmed =

American poet

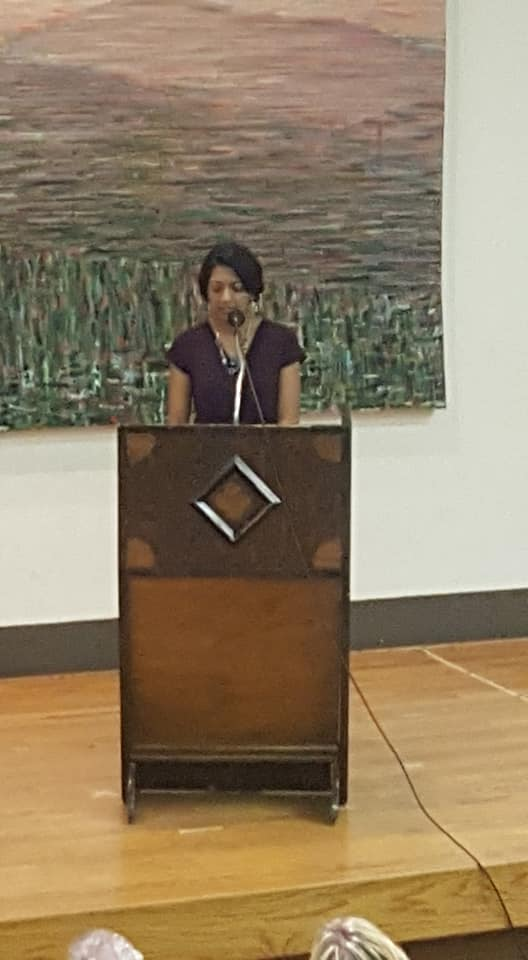
- Dilruba Ahmed delivers the keynote speech at the 2018 LitLife Poetry Conference, Rosemont College.
- Education: University of Pittsburgh; Warren Wilson College
- Writing career
- Years active: 2011—present
- Genre: Poetry

Dilruba Ahmed is an American writer, educator, and poet of Bangladeshi descent. Her work was selected by Major Jackson for The Best American Poetry 2019.

== Early life ==
Dilruba Ahmed was born in the United States and grew up in western Pennsylvania and rural Ohio. Her parents are from Bangladesh and immigrated to the United States. Her interest in poetry comes from her mother who used to write and recite poetry in Bangladesh. From her mother she learned the works of Rabindranath Tagore and Jibanananda Das. She completed her BPhil and MAT from the University of Pittsburgh. She graduated with MFA from the Warren Wilson College. She has taught at the Low-Residency MFA program of the Chatham University and at Bryn Mawr College.

== Career ==
Dilruba Ahmed's first poetry collection Dhaka Dust (Graywolf Press, 2011) won the Bakeless Prize awarded by the Bread Loaf Writers' Conference. In her poem she writes about the Bangladeshi American experience in the United States and also in Dhaka, Bangladesh. The book was selected by contest judge Arthur Sze. Her poetry has been anthologized in The Human Experience (Bedford/St. Martin's), Halal If You Hear Me (Haymarket Books), and An Anthology of Contemporary South Asian American Poetry (University of Arkansas). Her poem, "The 18th Century Weavers of Muslin Whose Thumbs Were Chopped" deals with colonial repression by the British Raj in the Bengal.

Ahmed's second book, Bring Now the Angels, was selected by Ed Ochester for the Pitt Poetry Series and was published by University of Pittsburgh Press in April 2020.
