= Purvi Shah =

American poet

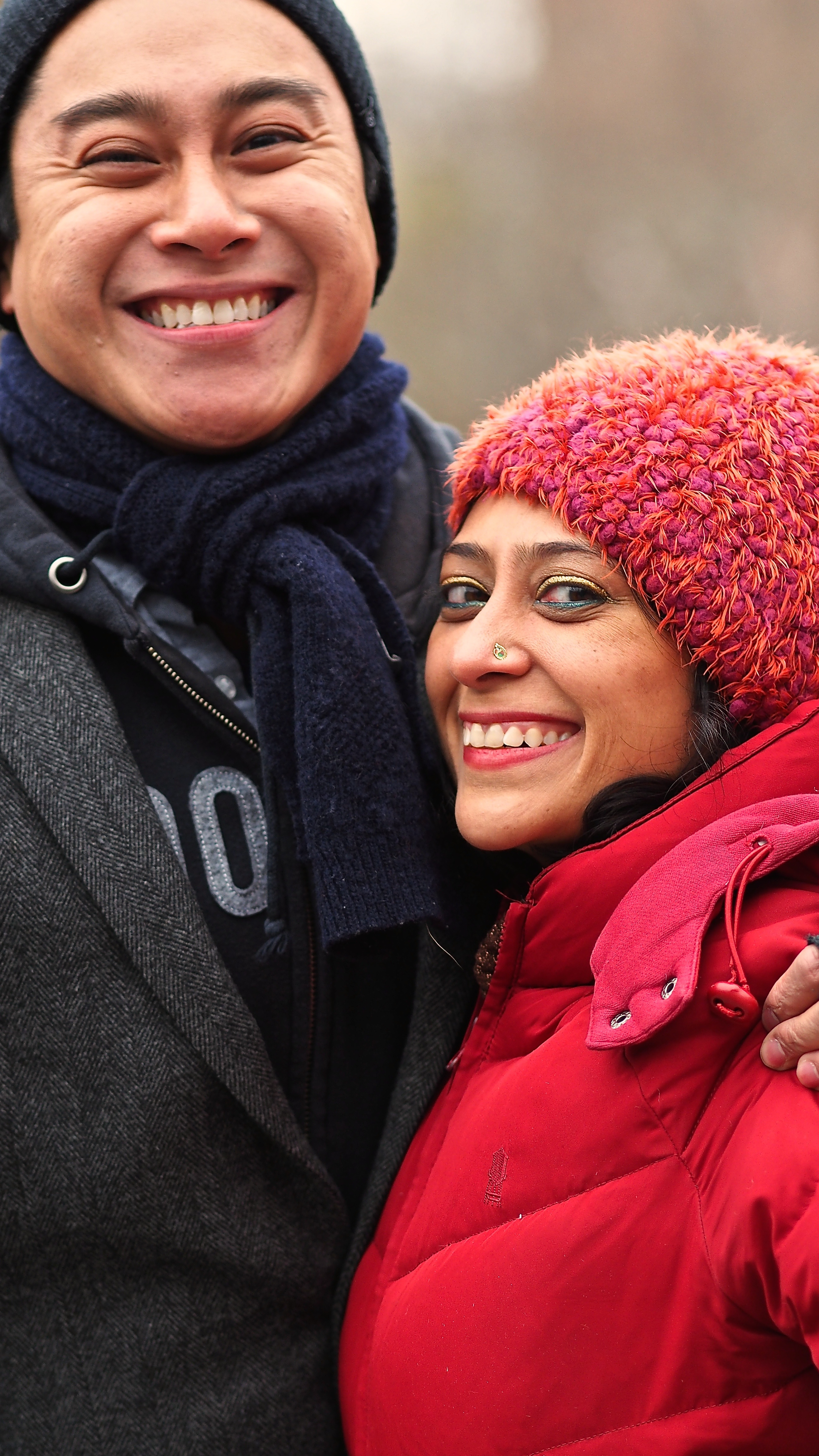
- Purvi Shah with Ron Villanueva during a rally in Washington Square, New York, in December 2014
- Occupation: writer and social justice activist
- Genre: poetry
- Notable works: Terrain Tracks; Miracle Marks

Purvi Shah is a writer and social justice activist, known for her work to enable language access and advocacy for immigrant survivors of violence.

== Career ==
Shah is the author of three collections of poetry, Terrain Tracks (New Rivers Press, 2006), Dark Lip of the Beloved – Sound Your Fiery God-Praise (belladonna*, 2015), and Miracle Marks (Northwestern University Press, 2019). Her debut collection, Terrain Tracks, won the Many Voices Project prize and was nominated for the Asian American Writers’ Workshop Members’ Choice Award in 2007.

Of Miracle Marks, Seema Reza wrote for The Kenyon Review, "Shah traces the links of the chains that bound and continue to bind Indian women into submission and exclusion... Here the use of space is not only aesthetic, but political—the words spread like oil on water, the marks cannot be contained. The miracles compound and morph: woman in pursuit, woman as monster, woman as mark-maker and space-taker. And woman refusing: to offer herself as refuge, as sacrifice, as martyr." She has consulted with the Center for Court Innovation and the Mayor's Office to End Domestic and Gender-Based Violence, and authored the 2017 report, "Seeding Generations: New Strategies Towards Services for People who Abuse." During the 10th anniversary of 9/11, she directed Together We Are New York, a community-based poetry project to highlight Asian American voices. In addition to journals and anthologies, her work is part of public art in Iowa libraries including at Grinnell College.

== Awards ==
Her honors include winning the inaugural SONY South Asian Excellence Award for Social Service in 2008 for her work to end violence against women.

== Education ==
Shah earned her B.A. in Anthropology and Comparative Literature from the University of Michigan, where she won the Virginia Voss Poetry Writing Award, and earned her M.A. in American Literature from Rutgers University.
