= Therese Park =

Korean author, now living in the US

Therese Park is a South Korean author, now living in the US. An accomplished cellist, she moved to the US to perform with the Kansas City Philharmonic (now the Kansas City Symphony) in 1966. After 30 years, she retired and began writing full-time.

A Gift of the Emperor (1997), her first novel, concerns a Korean schoolgirl, Soon-Ah, who is forced into military prostitution by the Japanese government during World War II.

Park's second novel When a Rooster Crows at Night: A Child's Experience of the Korean War was published in 2004 (ISBN 0-595-30876-7). This story is based on what Park witnessed during the Korean war (1950–1953) as a child.

Her columns and articles have been published since 1984 in such publications as The Kansas City Star, The Sun Publication, The Best times, and Our Family (Canada), The Graybeard, the National Korean War Veterans Magazine in Washington D.C., The Beat Magazine and Korea Bridge South Korea.

She graduated Seoul National University-School of music in 1963 with a Bachelor of Music degree and Ecole Normale de Musique de Paris with a Master of Cello Performance degree. (She studied with legendary Andre′ Navarra)

In 2006, she wrote "Midwest Voices" columns for The Kansas City Star-Opinion Page, and since January 2009, she has been writing columns for the Star-Johnson County Neighborhood News.

== Historical novels ==
- A Gift of the Emperor (1997) ISBN 0-595-35005-4
- When a Rooster Crows at Night: A Child's Experience of the Korean War (2004) ISBN 0-595-30876-7
- The Northern Wind: Forced Journey to North Korea (2012) ISBN 978-1-4697-6908-0

Her 2015 columns in the Kansas City Star:

- The Power of Music-And Connections;
- Worries of Aging can wait: Leaves fall in Their Given Times;
- Priest (Father Emil Kapaun) Service Still Makes Ripples;
- 65 Years later, Vet Recalls His Time in "The Forgotten War";
- Recalling War's Horror;
- Even in uncertain Times, We Have a Glimpse of Heaven;
- The Spirit of America Defies Terrorism in Boston;
- As We Age, Companionship Is a Blessing;
- Through Song, Black History Month Comes Alive;
- Women Priests Need To Find A New Path For the Church’s Sake;
- Vacation (to Teton, Wyoming) a Time for learning, Fun, and Renewal
- Life's Burdens are not equal, So Let's be Charitable
- Musings on Alaska, A Land of Surprises
- Warriors in the Fight Against Breast Cancer
- Diabetes is a Dangerous Foe
