= Dorinne Kondo =

American anthropologist

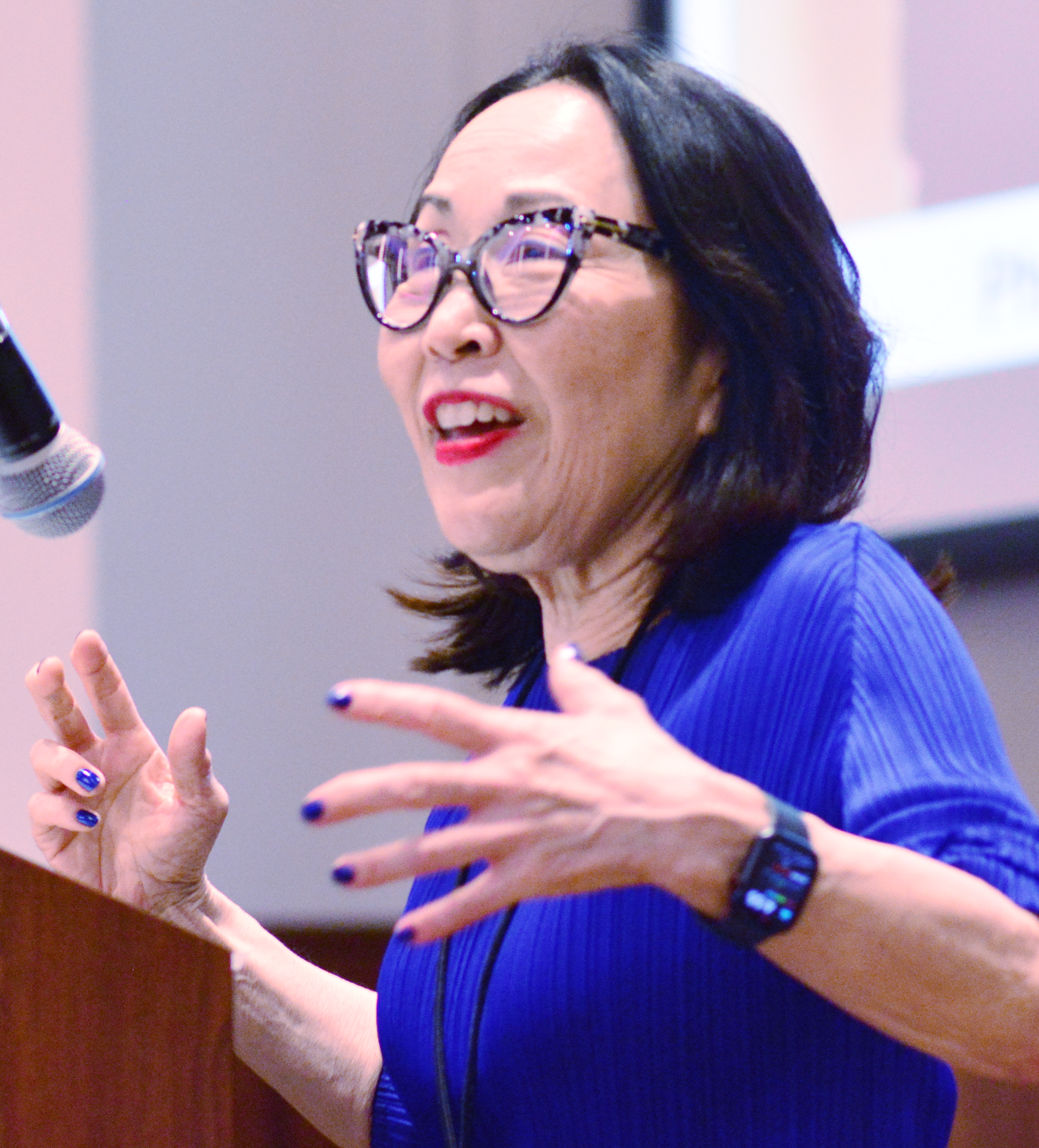
Dorinne Kondo, 2025

Dorinne K. Kondo is a professor of American studies and Ethnicity and Anthropology at the University of Southern California. She is a scholar, playwright, and has over 20 years of work experience in dramaturge; her work shows the structural inequality of race and ethnicities in the world of contemporary theatre. Her writings discuss issues on power, gender inequality, the discourses in a Japanese workplace, and racism in the fashion industry.

Kondo suffered a cardiac incident in which one of her valves was leaking. Her book launch for Worldmaking: Race, Performance and the Work of Creativity, was postponed three years due to her open-heart surgery.

== Education ==
Kondo's education was fully focalized on Anthropology. She received her Bachelor of Anthropology from Stanford University in 1975. She continued her studies by taking her Masters in Anthropology in Harvard University in 1978. She then obtained her Ph.D. in Anthropology in Harvard University in 1982. Dorinne Kondo has specialized in research after finishing her Ph.D. at Harvard University. She practiced research and taught as an Assistant Professor of Anthropology in Harvard University 1982. Her research was on race and power, performance studies, theories of subject, and cultural theory.

=== Degrees ===
- Ph.D., Department of Anthropology, Harvard University, 1982
- M.A., Department of Anthropology, Harvard University, 1978
- B.A., Phi Beta Kappa, Departmental Honors, Distinction, Department of Anthropology, Stanford University, 1975

Kondo had multiple postdoctoral training from (1987-2002), such as in:

- Fellow, University of California, Irvine Humanities Research Institute, Spring 2002
- Research Fellow, Getty Research Institute, 2000-2001
- Institute of American Cultures Postdoctoral Fellow, UCLA, 1993-1994
- Fellow, University of California, Irvine Humanities Research Institute, Fall 1993
- Rockefeller Fellow, Rice University, 1989-1990
- Rockefeller Fellow, The Institute for Advanced Study, Princeton, NJ, 1987-1988

== Career ==
Kondo is a professor and started her career as an Assistant Professor of Anthropology in Harvard University for seven years from 1982 to 1989. She became a MacArthur Associate Professor of Women's Studies and Anthropology; later on she was appointed to be a Full Professor in 1997 at Pomona College. She is now a Professor of Anthropology and American Studies and Ethnicity at the University of Southern California and she has been at the University of Southern California since 1997.

Her career mainly focused on gender studies and ethnology as she has now portrayed her knowledge on discrimination and gender inequality in her dramaturge and playwright. In her book Worldmaking: Race, Performance and the Work of Creativity, Kondo posits the racialized constructions of imbalance that pervade theater and the arts. Grounded in twenty years of hands on work as dramaturge and writer, Kondo activates critical race researches, influence hypothesis, analysis, and emotional composition to abrasively break down performance center's work of inventiveness as hypothesis: acting, writing, and dramaturgy.

Her other book About Face analyzes representations of Asia and their resonations in both Asia and Asian American lives. Japanese high fashion and Asian American theater become points of passage into the political issues of pleasure, the presentation of racial personalities, the possibility of political intervention in commodity capitalism. In view of Kondo's hands on work, this interdisciplinary work unites papers, interviews with fashioner Rei Kawakubo of Comme des Garçons and dramatist David Henry Hwang, and "individual" vignettes in its investigation of counter-orientalism.

Paul H. Noguchi, an American Anthropologist, commented on Kondo's book Crafting Selves: "The ethnography of Japan is currently being reshaped by a new generation of Japanologists, and the present work certainly deserves a place in this body of literature. . . . The combination of utility with beauty makes Kondo’s book required reading, for those with an interest not only in Japan but also in reflexive anthropology, women’s studies, field methods, the anthropology of work, social psychology, Asian Americans, and even modern literature."

=== Work ===
Dorinne Kondo has worked on funded researches such as:

- Creative Differences; The Cultural Politics of Race in American Theater (Stanford Humanities Center), Dorinne Kondo, $60,000, 2013-2014
- Advancing Scholarship in the Humanities and Social Sciences Mentorship (University of Southern California), Dorinne Kondo, $1,000, 2012

== Books ==
- Kondo, D. K. (2018). Worldmaking: Race, Performance and the Work of Creativity. Durham, NC: Duke University Press.
- Kondo, D. K. (1997). About face: performing race in fashion and theater, 1997.
- Kondo, D. K. (1990). Crafting Selves: Power, Gender and Discourses of Identity in a Japanese Workplace, 1990.
