= Patti Kim (writer) =

American novelist (born 1970)

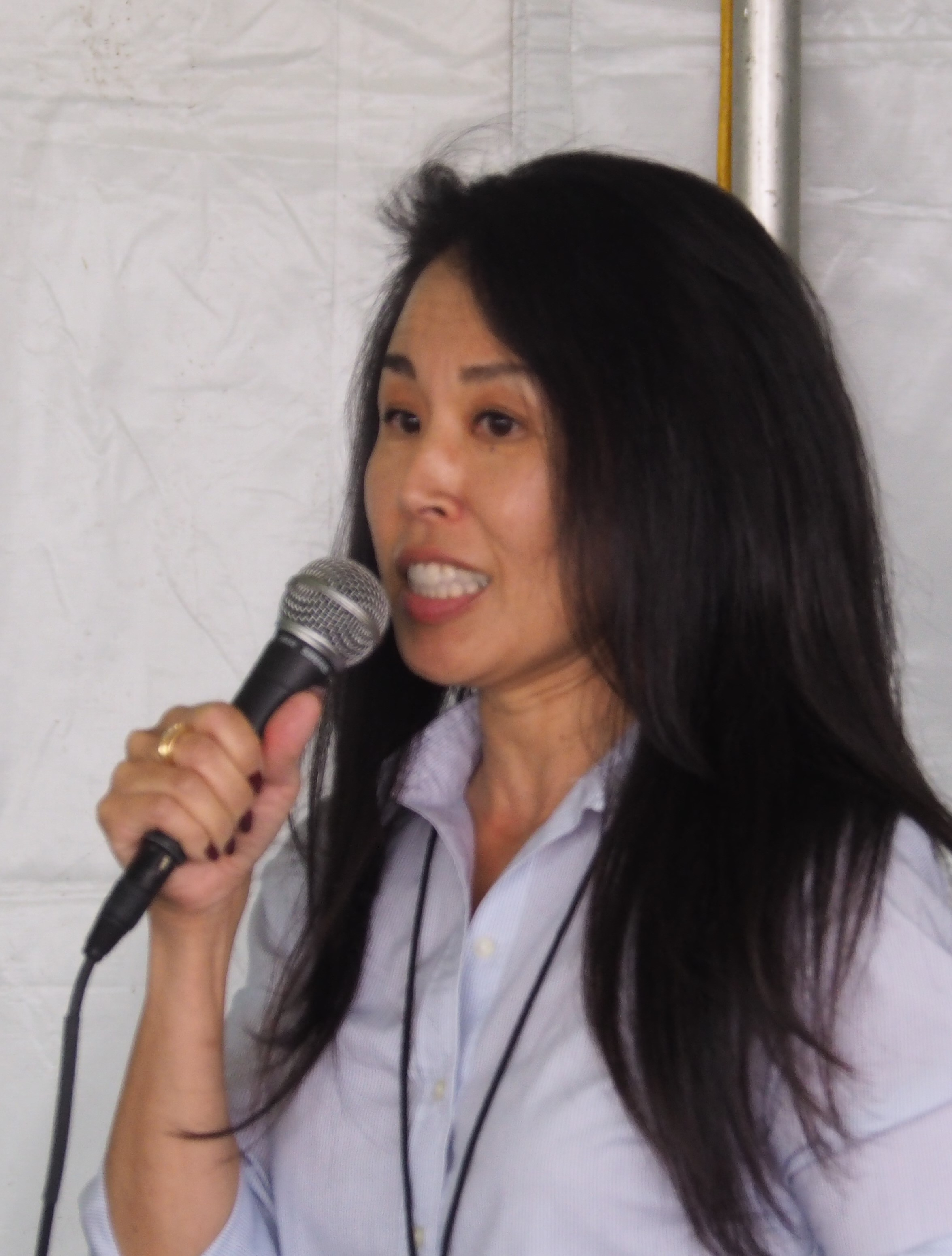
- Born: 1970 (age 55–56); Busan, South Korea
- Education: University of Maryland

Patti Kim (born 1970) is a Korean American writer and a Diane Cleaver fellow. Kim is the author of the award-winning novel A Cab Called Reliable, children's picture book Here I Am, middle grade novel, I'm Ok, and middle grade novel, It's Girls Like You, Mickey.

== Biography ==
Patti Kim was born in Busan, South Korea, and immigrated to the United States with her family in 1974 when she was four years old. She graduated from the University of Maryland.

== Selected works ==
- A Cab Called Reliable, St. Martin's Griffin, 1998
- Here I Am, Capstone 2013
- I'm Ok, Atheneum Books at Simon & Schuster, 2018
- It's Girls Like You, Mickey, Atheneum Books at Simon & Schuster 2020

== Awards and recognition ==
- I'm OK designated as An Asian/Pacific American Literature Award Honor Book
- EmpathyLab Editors' Pick for inclusion in its "2018 Read for Empathy Guide". (February 2018) (2014)
- GOLD Winner for Picture Books, Family Choice Awards (2014)
- National Parenting Publications Award (NAPPA) (2014)
- Tillywig Brainchild Award (2014)
- Best Children’s Book of the Year by Children’s Book Committee at Bank Street College of Education (2014)
- Will Eisner Comic Industry Award Nominee (2014)
- Kirkus Reviews Best Children’s Books (2013)
- Kirkus Reviews Best Picture Books About Family & Friends (2013)
- IndieFab Book of the Year Award (2013)
- Diane Cleaver Fellow at Ledig House
- Book-of-the-Month Club's Stephen Crane Award for First Fiction
- Honorable Mention by Huffington Post Books
- Towson University Prize for Fiction 1997
