= David Mura =

American author and critic (born 1952)

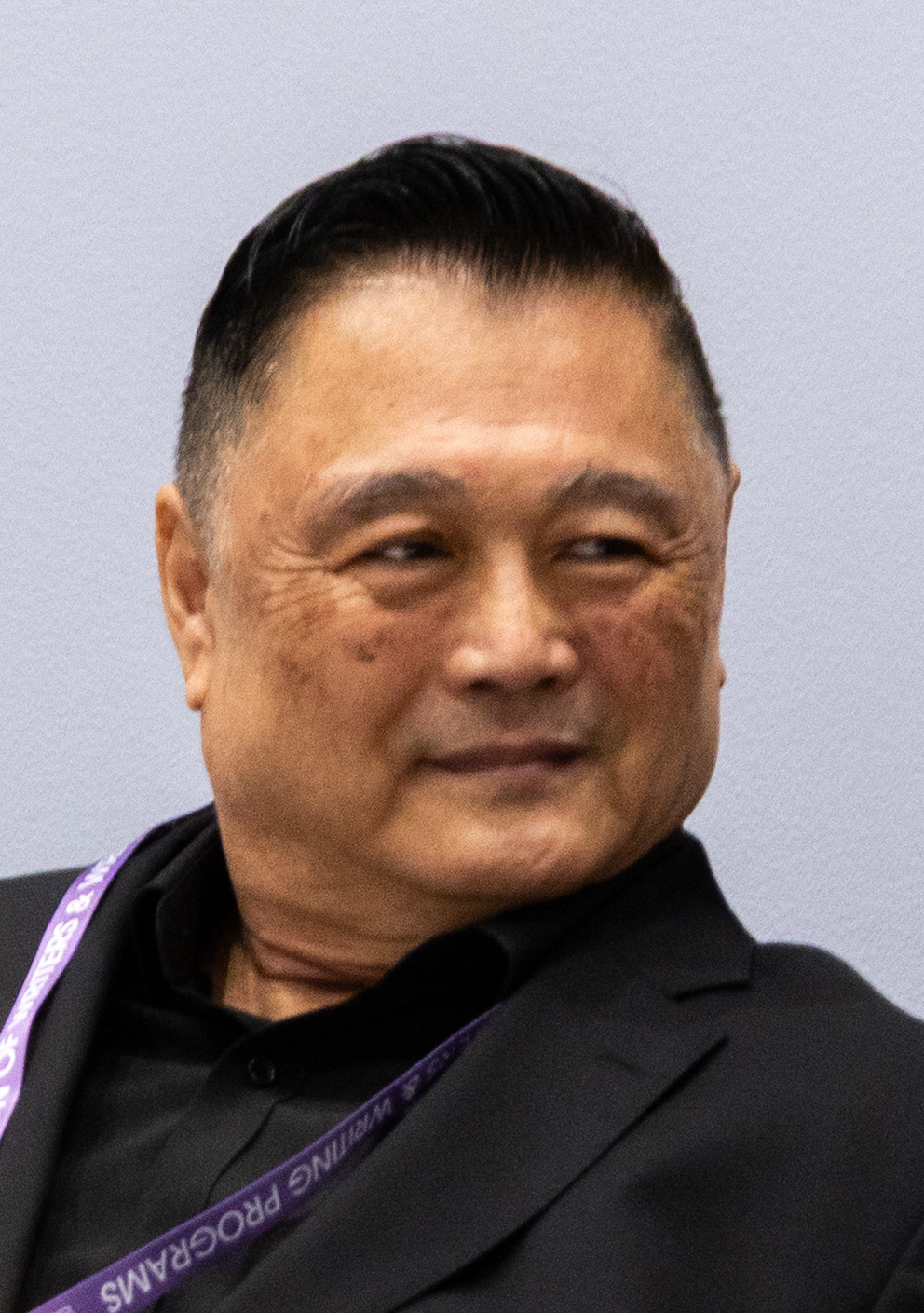
- Mura at AWP 2025
- Born: 1952 (age 73–74)
- Education: Grinnell College (BA); Vermont College of Fine Arts (MFA)
- Occupations: Author; poet; novelist; playwright; critic; performance artist
- Website: davidmura.com

David Mura (born 1952) is an American author, poet, novelist, playwright, critic and performance artist whose writings explore the themes of race, identity and history. In 2018, Mura published a book on creative writing, A Stranger’s Journey: Race, Identity & Narrative Craft in Writing, in which he argues for a more inclusive and expansive definition of craft.

Mura has published two memoirs, Turning Japanese: Memoirs of a Sansei, which won the Josephine Miles Book Award from the Oakland PEN and was listed in the New York Times Notable Books of the Year, and Where the Body Meets Memory: An Odyssey of Race, Sexuality and Identity (1995). His most recent book of poetry is The Last Incantation (2014); his other poetry books include After We Lost Our Way, which won the National Poetry Contest, The Colors of Desire (winner of the Carl Sandburg Literary Award), and Angels for the Burning. His novel is titled Famous Suicides of the Japanese Empire (Coffee House Press, 2008).

Mura communicates frequently through his social media accounts: blog.davidmura.com; @MuraDavid

== Early life and education ==
David Mura was born in 1952 and grew up in Chicago, Illinois, the oldest of four children. He is a third generation Japanese American son of parents interned during World War II. After the war, his father changed the family name "Uemura" to "Mura". His grandparents came to the USA from Japan before the Russo-Japanese War (1904).

Mura earned his B.A. degree from Grinnell College and his M.F.A. in creative writing from Vermont College of Fine Arts. He has taught at the University of Minnesota, St. Olaf College, The Loft Literary Center, and the University of Oregon. He currently resides in Saint Paul, Minnesota, with his wife Susan Sencer and their three children; Samantha, Nikko and Tomo.

== Published works ==
Full-length poetry collections

- After We Lost Our Way (Dutton, 1989; Carnegie-Mellon Press, 1997 - 2nd Edition)
- The Colors of Desire: Poems (Anchor Books, 1995)
- Angels for the Burning: Poems (BOA Editions, Ltd., 2004)
- The Last Incantations (Northwestern University Press, 2014)

Novels

- Famous Suicides of the Japanese Empire (Coffee House Press, 2008)

Memoirs/Nonfiction

- Where the Body Meets Memory: An Odyssey of Race, Sexuality and Identity (Anchor Books, 1995)
- Turning Japanese: Memoirs of a Sansei (Atlantic Monthly Press, 1991; Anchor Books, 1992; Grove Press, 2005 - 3rd Edition)
- A Male Grief: Notes on Pornography and Addiction: An Essay (Milkweed Editions, 1987; republished as an Amazon e-book 2010)

Literary Craft/Criticism

- Song for Uncle Tom, Tonto, and Mr. Moto: Poetry and Identity (University of Michigan Press, 2002)
- A Stranger’s Journey: Race, Identity & Narrative Craft in Writing (University of Georgia Press, 2018)
- The Stories Whiteness Tells Itself: Racial Myths and Our American Narratives (University of Minnesota Press, 2023)

Films

- Slowly, This—written & featuring David Mura & Alexs Pate; dir. by Arthur Jafa; produced by the PBS Series ALIVE TV, 1995
- Relocations—written and performed by David Mura; directed by Mark Tang (four selections from the performance piece, Relocations: Images from a Sansei), 1998

== Awards and honors ==
Mura's honors include two NEA fellowships, the 1994 Lila Wallace-Reader's Digest Writers' Award (which included a cash prize of $105,000), and a US/Japan Creative Artist Fellowship, two Bush Foundation Fellowships, four Loft-McKnight Awards, several Minnesota State Arts Board grants, and a Discovery/The Nation Award. He has had his work published in literary journals and magazines including The Nation, The American Poetry Review, The New Republic, The Missouri Review, and Crazyhorse.

- 1994: Lila Wallace-Reader's Digest Writers' Awards
- 1993: National Endowment for the Arts - Literature Fellowships
- 1988: National Poetry Series
- 1987: Discovery/The Nation Award
- 1985: National Endowment for the Arts - Literature Fellowships
- 1984: U.S. - Japan Creative Artist Fellowship
