= Charlie Chan Is Dead: An Anthology of Contemporary Asian American Fiction =

1993 anthology of Asian-American fiction

- Editor: Jessica Hagedorn
- Language: English
- Genre: Anthology, literary fiction
- Publisher: Penguin Books
- Publication date: December 1, 1993
- Publication place: United States
- Pages: 592
- ISBN: 978-0140231113

Charlie Chan is Dead: An Anthology of Contemporary Asian American Fiction is a 1993 fiction anthology featuring works written by forty-eight largely Asian American authors. It was edited by writer and multimedia performance artist Jessica Hagedorn and featured a preface from Elaine H. Kim, then a professor in Ethnic Studies and Asian American Studies at the University of California, Berkeley.

As the first anthology of Asian American fiction by a commercial publisher in the United States, it is considered by critics to be a notable work in Asian American literary history.

== Preface ==
Kim traces the history of race and racism in the United States, specifically the creation and separation of "race-based communities" which have been respectively defined by their proximity and possible threat to the dominant culture. With regard to the Asian American community, such proximity has been repeatedly bifurcated in a contradicting manner. On one hand, Asian Americans have been depicted as model minorities, or marginalized people who have shown socioeconomic and assimilatory success in spite of difficult circumstances. On the other hand, Asian Americans have also been depicted as forever foreigners, or marginalized people who will always remain as such on the margins of society due to their inherent alienation from the dominant culture.

Kim then articulates Asian American literature as having components of "protest and exile," "place and displacement," and "psychic and physical 'home'" amidst the lack of "home" or an urgent desire to return to one ("homecoming," Kim asserts). Such definition of "Asian American," as well as its ensuing literature, made for a canonical body of work which Kim considers to be lacking "subtleties, hybridities, paradoxes, and layers." Kim then addresses the present state of Asian American literature alongside the unprecedented vastness and diversity of Asian Americans at the time of writing in the nineties. In her view, Asian American communities are more populous, abundant with different lifestyles, and blurred in their distinctions to the other race-based communities surrounding them. Kim thus greets the anthology as a celebration of "many ways of being Asian American today, when the question need no longer be 'either/or.'"

== Introduction ==
Hagedorn discusses the origins and meaning of Charlie Chan, a "fake 'Asian' pop icon—known for his obsequious manner, fractured English, and dainty walk. Absurdly cryptic, pseudo-Confucian sayings rolled off his tongue." She identifies his creation in 1925, by a white man named Earl Derr Biggers, and locates him alongside other racist stereotypes such as Fu Manchu, Stepin Fetchit, Sambo, Aunt Jemima, and more. By the end of the twentieth century, Hagedorn asserts, racist stereotypes have evolved to become more subtle, such as the "greedy, clever Japanese Businessman, ready to buy up New York City and all the Van Goghs in the world" or "Miss Saigon, the contemporary version of Madame Butterfly—tragic victim/whore of wartorn Vietnam, eternally longing for the white boy soldier who has abandoned her and her son." She then recounts her own personal history of becoming a writer and also working alongside contemporary Asian American writers like Genny Lim and participants of the Kearny Street Workshop.

Hagedorn also pays homage to Aiiieeeee! An Anthology of Asian-American Writers, an anthology published in 1974—edited by Frank Chin, Jeffery Paul Chan, Lawson Fusao Inada, and Shawn Wong—which was "an absolute breakthrough for Asian Americans" and "gave us visibility and credibility as creators of our own specific literature." She also mentions The Big Aiiieeeee!, the sequel anthology which featured more authors of various genres and ethnicities, as well as The Colors of Heaven, edited by Trevor Carolan, which anthologized works from authors on the Pacific Rim. Hagedorn then concludes by proudly presenting Charlie Chan is Dead: An Anthology of Contemporary Asian American Fiction as "the first anthology of Asian American fiction by a commercial publisher in this country" and briefly goes over some of the pieces featured inside.

== Charlie Chan ==
The anthology's title refers to the historic caricature Charlie Chan, a Honolulu detective written in a series of mystery novels by Earl Derr Biggers, after which dozens of Hollywood films in his likeness were made. While Charlie Chan allegedly offered an alternative to existing Fu Manchu and other Yellow Peril stereotypes, many scholars say that he, still a creation of the white gaze, only ended up establishing and reinstating other stereotypes against Asian Americans. In particular, Kim criticizes his "yellowface asexual bulk, his fortune-cookie English," while Hagedorn considers him both demeaning for similar reasons but also, as the creation of a white man, inherently unrepresentative of actual Asian American experience. In The New Yorker, Jill Lepore wrote: "Charlie Chan is also one of the most hated characters in American popular culture. In the nineteen-eighties and nineties, distinguished American writers, including Frank Chin and Gish Jen, argued for laying Chan to rest, a yellow Uncle Tom, best buried."

== Reception ==
Many literary critics and scholars consider the anthology to be a seminal work of Asian American literature, often naming it alongside other important bodies of text like Aiiieeeee! An Anthology of Asian-American Writers. For The Strategist, in New York Magazine, Christine Bacareza Balance stated that the anthology arrived at a historical moment when "people were starting to understand that there is a thing called Asian American literature," which ultimately provided an opportunity to "push that idea and bring a lot of new writers into the scene."

Kirkus Reviews lauded it as "A generous and varied sampling: 48 authors writing in a variety of styles, 22 selections previously unpublished and many others published only overseas or by journals or small presses—a substantial, often engrossing volume at a bargain price," though opined as well that it was "surely needing an update soon to include Vietnamese and other Southeast Asian-American voices."

Philip F. C. Williams, for the Association of Asian Studies, found difficulty with the anthology's execution. He notes the disparity of representation among the Asian diaspora, namely that "'Asian' in this anthology would more accurately be termed 'East Asian.'" Furthermore, he points out that the anthology's organization—merely alphabetical—could be hard for readers: "However, the arrangement of the book's material leaves something to be desired, for Hagedorn has grouped the anthology's stories neither into any recognizable historical or literary framework, nor along national or ethnic lines."

In a brief review, Publishers Weekly found the range of stories to be interesting, yet the stories themselves generally "seem to lack a cohering premise."

Sven Birkerts, writing for The New York Times, critiqued the anthology's definition and curation of Asian American literature as too broad, claiming, "To begin with, there are just too many different kinds of inclusions ... 'Asian American' has here become a term so hospitable that half the world's population can squeeze in under its banner. Generous and catholic, yes—but the mix is also jarring and too eclectic." Birkets goes on to say that Hagedorn "has made some ill-advised decisions" for the authors she chose, namely that "First-rate work by authors like Joy Kogawa, David Wong Louie, Jose Garcia Villa, John Yau and Jocelyn Lieu must sit side by side with a number of less than distinguished stories from the post-modernist grab bag."

In a letter to the editor for The New York Times, Hagedorn responded to Birkets' review, stating that he was unnecessarily and unqualifiedly harsh on the matter of curation: "What exactly are his criteria for categorizing someone as Asian American? Since this is the first anthology of its kind, is this really the time to be narrow? ... Is Mr. Birkerts an immigration official or a literary critic? Should we all send in our passports and green cards for verification? I don't worry about Mr. Birkerts's own ethnicity, nor do I expect every writer to be to his taste. What I hope from any reviewer of "Charlie Chan Is Dead" is that he or she treat seriously the form and substance of our literature." Susan Koshy cited this exchange as an example of the difficulty of minority literature gaining "recognition as world literature even though they depict transnational movements and identifications that diverge from those in canonical ethnic narrative". She also speculates that the exchange may have led Hagedorn to emphasize Asian Americans as citizens of the world in the introduction of the sequel, Charlie Chan is Dead 2: At Home in the World.

== Short stories included ==
Author	Title	First published
Meena Alexander	"Manhattan Music"	
Peter Bacho	"Rico"	The Seattle Review
Carlos Bulosan	"I Would Remember"	Carlos Bulosan Papers, University of Washington Libraries
Theresa Hak Kyung Cha	"Melpomene Tragedy"	Dictee by Theresa Hak Kyung Cha
Jeffery Paul Chan	"The Chinese in Haifa"	Aiiieeeee! An Anthology of Asian-American Writers edited by Frank Chin, Jeffery Paul Chan, Lawson Fusao Inada, and Shawn Wong
Diana Chang	"Falling Free"	Crosscurrents: A Quarterly
Fiona Cheong	"Natives"	
Marilyn Chin	"Moon"	
Lawrence Chua	"No Sayang Lost"	
Kiana Davenport	"Dragon Seed"	
Hisaye Yamamoto DeSoto	"Eucalyptus"	Gidra
N. V. M. Gonzalez	"The Bread of Salt"	
Jessica Hagedorn	"Film Noir"	
Kimiko Hahn	"Afterbirth"	
Gish Jen	"The Water-Faucet Vision"	Nimrod
Cynthia Kadohata	Excerpt from The Floating World	The Floating World by Cynthia Kadohata
Maxine Hong Kingston	"Twisters and Shouters"	Tripmaster Monkey by Maxine Hong Kingston
Joy Kogawa	Excerpt from Itsuka	Itsuka by Joy Kogawa
Alexander Kuo	"The Connoisseur of Chaos"	
Cherylene Lee	"Safe"	
Russell Leong	"Geography One"	
Walter Lew	"Black Korea"	
Jocelyn Lieu	"This World"	
R. Zamora Linmark	"They Like You Because You Eat Dog, So What Are You Gonna Do About It?"	
David Wong Louie	"Pangs of Love"	Pangs of Love and Other Stories by David Wong Louie
Darrell Lum	"Fourscore and Seven Years Ago"	
Laureen Mar	"Resistance"	
Ruthanne Lum McCunn	Excerpt from Thousand Pieces of Gold	Thousand Pieces of Gold by Ruthanne Lum McCunn
Ruxana Meer	"Razia Begum in London"	
Toshio Mori	"The Chauvinist"	The Chauvinist and Other Stories by Toshio Mori
Bharati Mukherjee	"A Father"	Darkness by Bharati Mukherjee
David Mura	"Fictive Fragments of a Father and Son"	Turning Japanese: Memoirs of a Sansei by David Mura
Fae Myenne Ng	"A Red Sweater"	The American Voice
Sigrid Nunez	"Chang"	The Threepenny Review
Han Ong	Excerpts from The Stranded in the World	
Ninotchka Rosca	"Sugar & Salt"	Ms.
Kerri Sakamoto	"Walk-In Closet"	
Bienvenido Santos	"Immigration Blues"	Scent of Apples by Bienvenido Santos
John J. Song	"Faith"	
Amy Tan	"Alien Relative"	Alchemy Literary Journal
José García Villa	"Untitled Story"	
Marianne Villanueva	"Lenox Hill, December 1991"	
Sylvia Watanabe	"Talking to the Dead"	Home to Stay: Asian American Women's Fiction edited by Sylvia Watanabe and Carol Bruchac
Shawn Wong	"Eye Contact"	
Yoji Yamaguchi	"Face"	Icarus
Lois-Ann Yamanaka	"Empty Heart"	
Wakako Yamauchi	"That Was All"	Amerasia Journal
John Yau	"Photographs for an Album (Third Version)"	
