= Asian American literature =

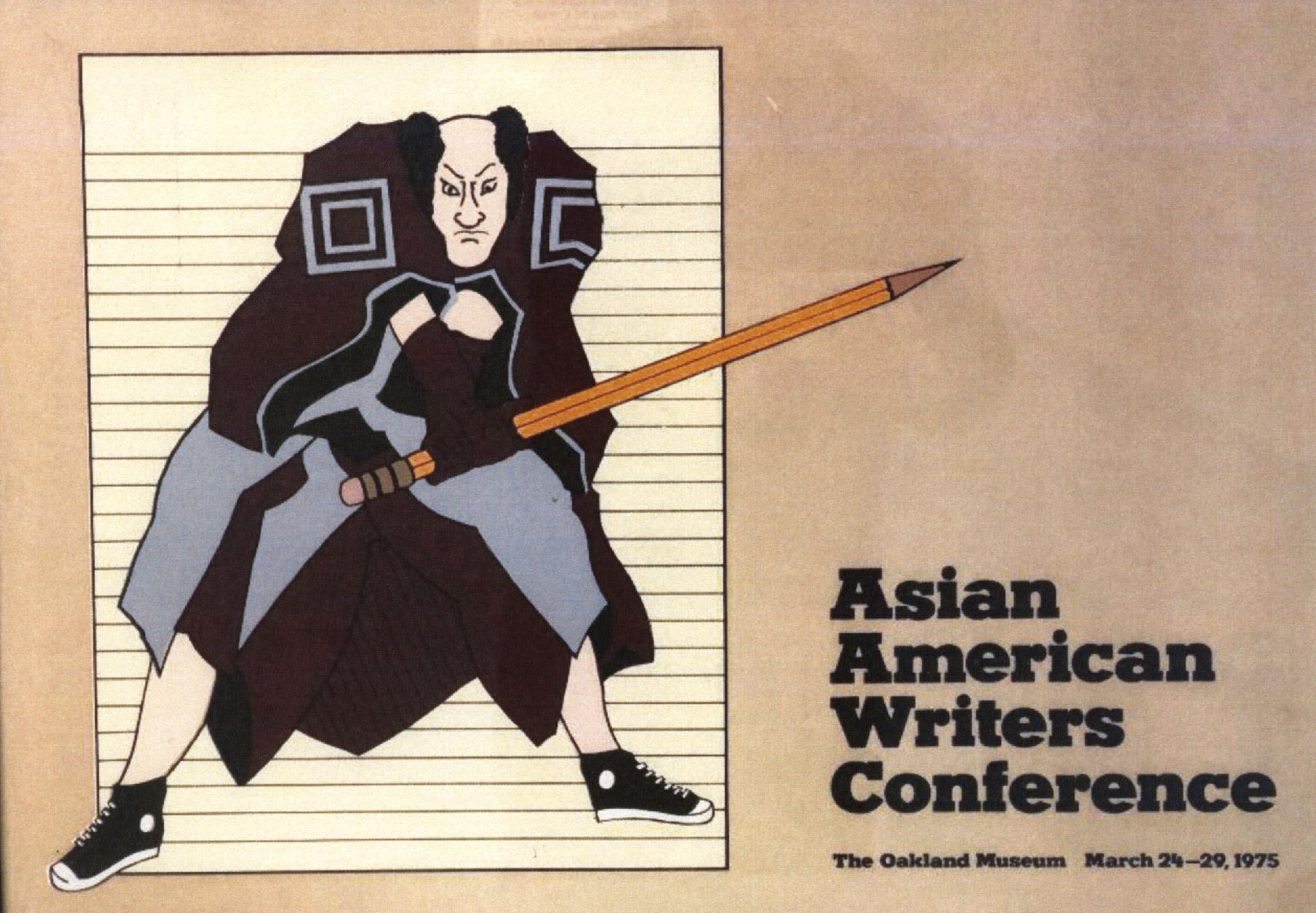
Asian American Writers Conference at The Oakland Museum March 24–29, 1975 poster.

Asian American literature is a category of literature regarding works published by writers of Asian descent that are from or have immigrated to the United States. Its subject matter relates to Asian Americans navigating the various experiences, identities, and struggles in the U.S.

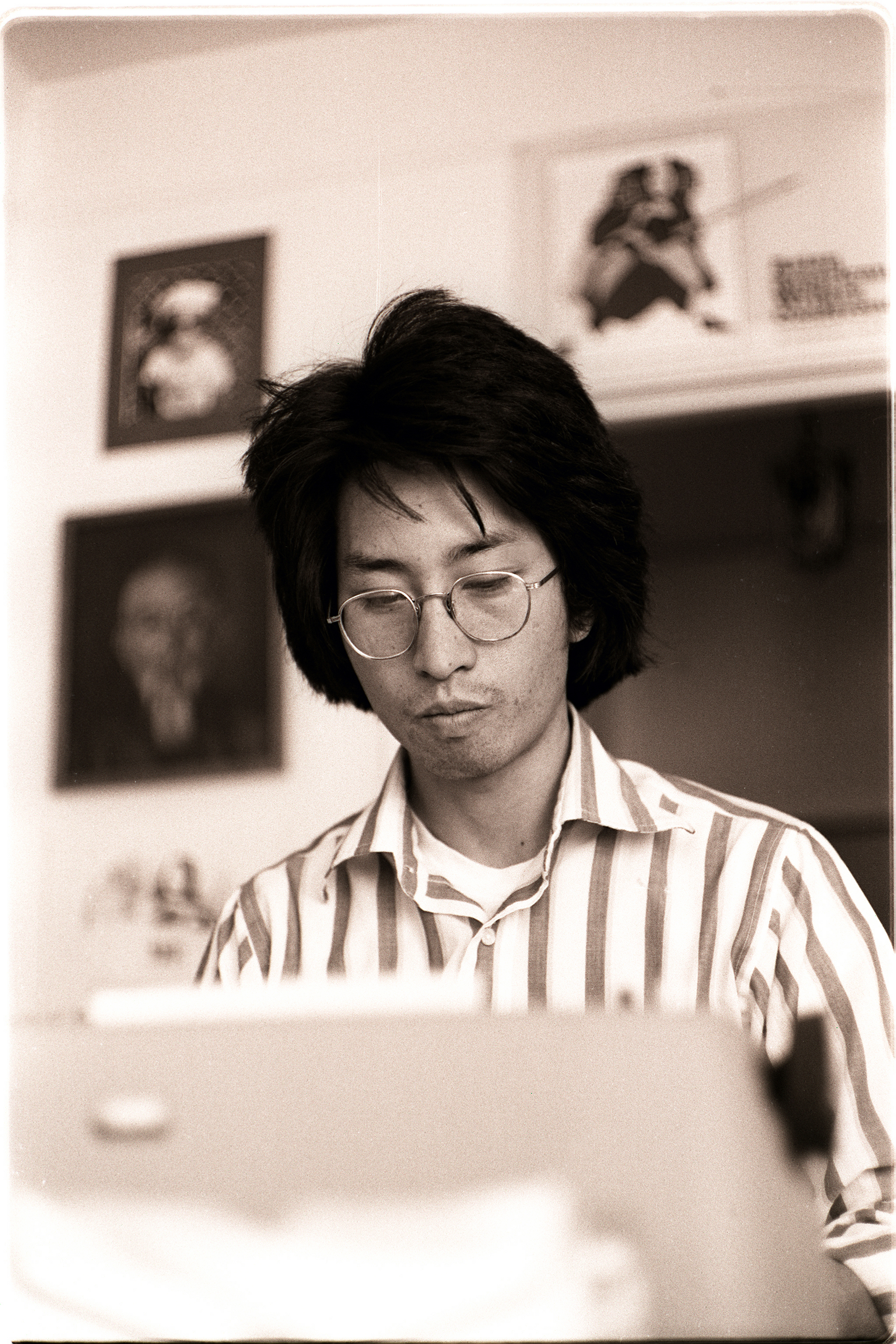
Shawn Wong, an editor of Aiiieeeee! An Anthology of Asian-American Writers.

Since its official emergence in the late 1960s, Asian American literature has expanded from a minor genre to an established tradition with numerous works becoming bestsellers and winning mainstream awards, such as the Pulitzer Prize and the National Book Award.

== History ==
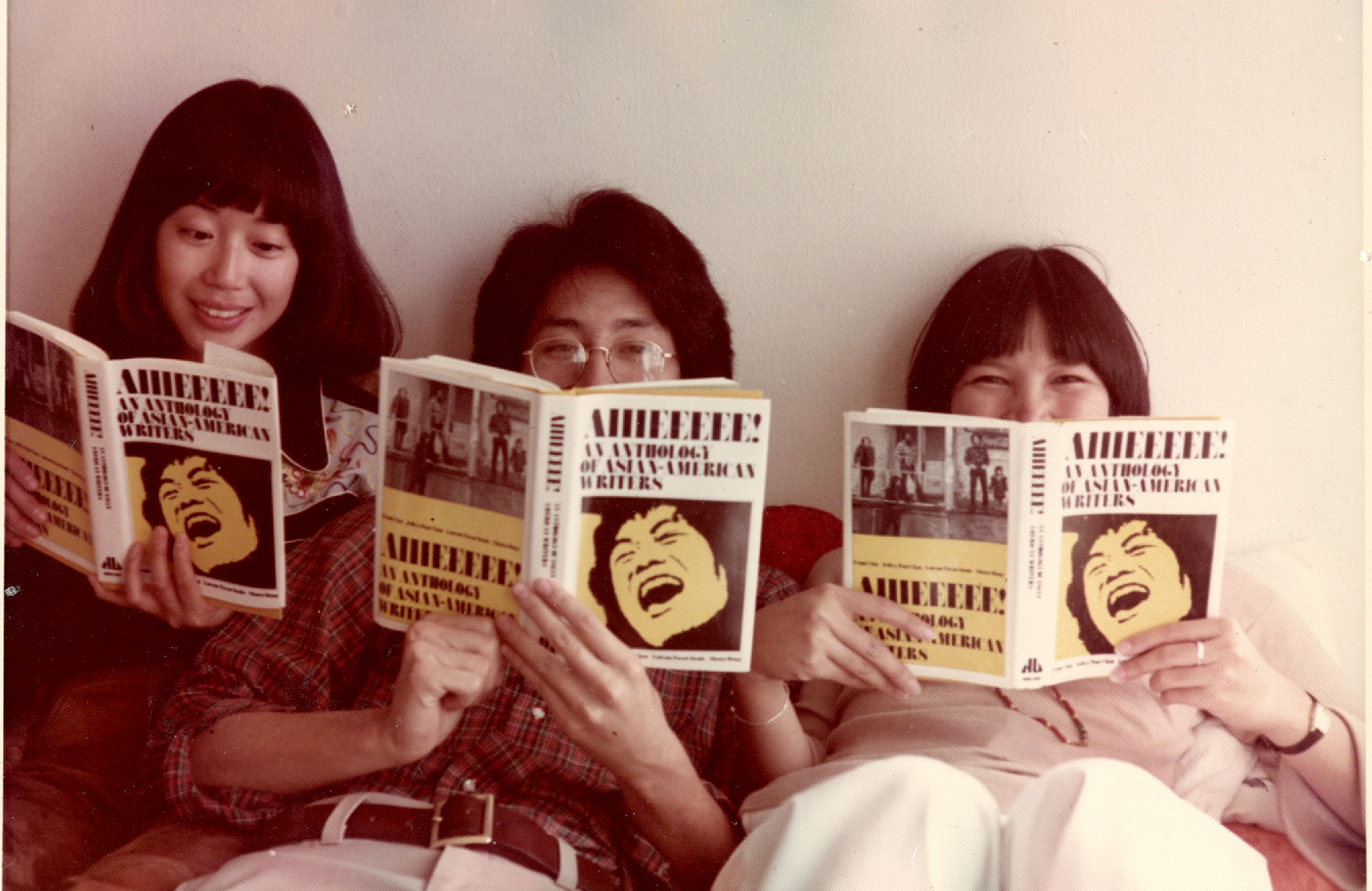
Reading the 1st edition of "Aiiieeeee!" in 1976.

The concept of Asian American writing and literature began garnering prominence in the mid-1970s following the 1965 Immigration and Nationality Act. Several early foundational edited collections of Asian American literature include the 1971 collection Roots: An Asian American Reader by Ami Tachiki , Asian American Heritage: An Anthology of Prose and Poetry by David Hsin-fu Wand in 1970, as well as Aiiieeeee! An Anthology of Asian-American Writers, produced by the Combined Asian American Resources Project (CARP). These works collected staples of long-forgotten Asian American literature and used the excerpts to shine light about the marginalization and lack of visibility towards Asian Americans; bringing it to the modern stage within college academics. Criticism of the book from decades later argued that its definition of Asian America was narrow, only accounting for “Filipino, Chinese, and Japanese Americans, American born and raised” not including Pacific Islander, Korean, and South Asian Americans (among others), in addition to having a highly masculine tone with the underrepresentation of women.

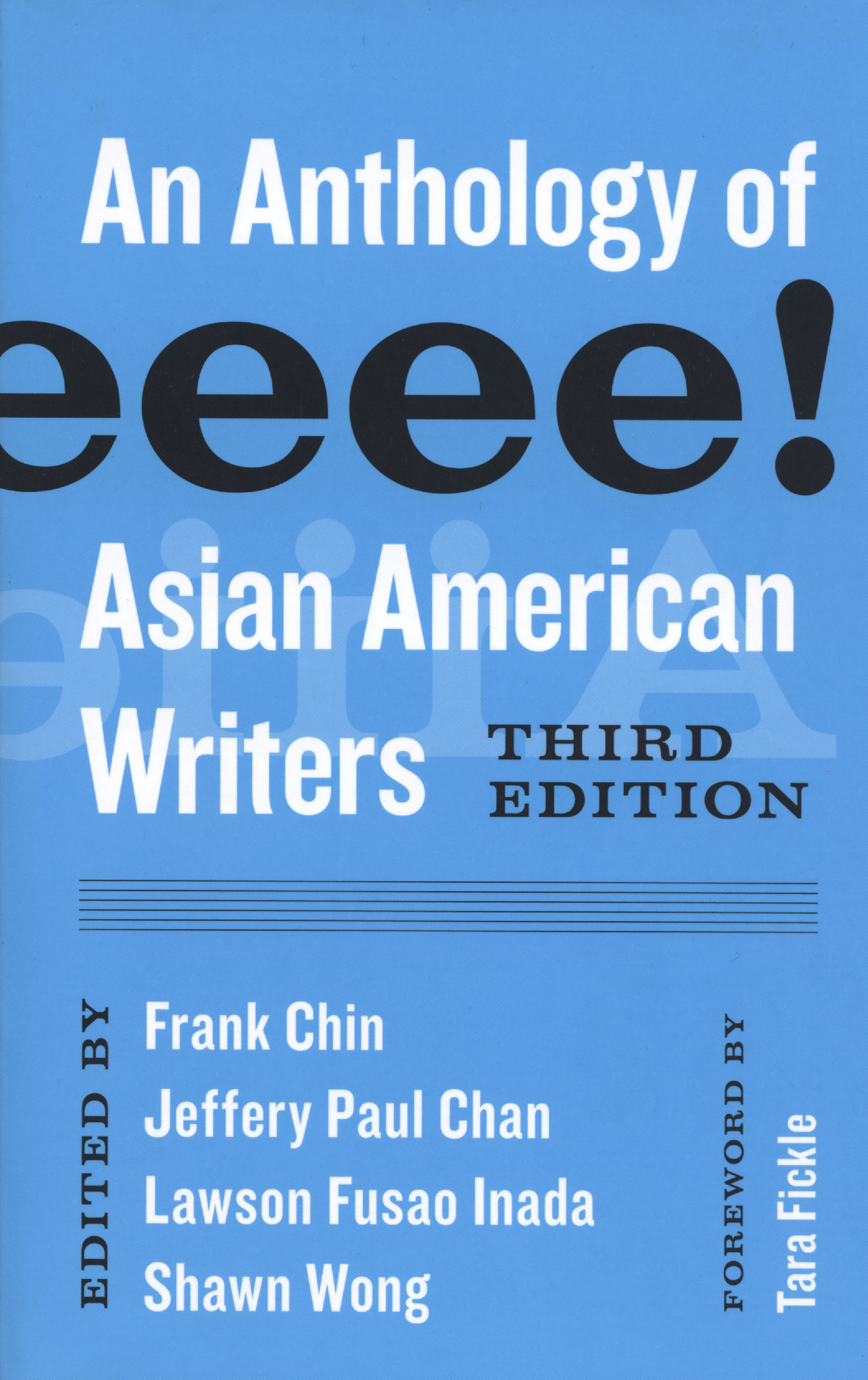
3rd edition of Aiiieeeee! An Anthology of Asian American Writers, 2019.

Prior to the establishment of Asian American literature as a distinct category, earlier Asian immigrants also produced literary and journalistic works. During the era of the Chinese Exclusion Act, literary works such as personal and collective poems regarding the Chinese immigrant experience were produced in Mandarin, Cantonese and English. Several of these were carved into the walls of the Angel Island Immigration Station by Chinese detainees; the memoirs of Chinese American life by diplomat Yung Wing’s My Life in China and America (1909) and the journalistic and fictional works of Sui Sin Far, the pen name of Edith Maude Eaton, who is widely considered the first Chinese-American professional creative writer.

John Okada’s 1957 novel, No-No Boy, about Japanese-American life post-internment, is now considered a classic work of Asian American literature, though at the time it was published, it languished in obscurity.

Following the 1970's, Asian American literature became more prominent in the United States shortly after the establishment of the 'Third World Liberation Front' in 1968. Started by groups of minority students studying at University of California, Berkeley, the five-month series of protests fought against unfair admissions of non-white applicants, and the absence of Ethnic studies as an interdisciplinary field. Student groups including African American, Asian American, and Native American unions protested for their cultural history to be integrated into curriculum. The front was a success, and resulted in the formation of a Department of Ethnic Studies.

Later, Asian American immigrants' second generation children would reach adulthood. This generation began writing their own experiences, and a new age of Asian American literature and stories began. The creation of LGBTQ+ groups in the United States, such as the Midwest's Asian American Lesbian and Gay Alliance in 1988, or the West Coast's Asian Pacific Alliance in 1980, created space for acceptance within the Asian American community, and encouraged these new writings.

Throughout the 1990s, multiple Asian American queer writings from authors such as (Merle Woo (1941), Willyce Kim (1946), Russell Leong (1950), Kitty Tsui (1952), Dwight Okita (1958), Norman Wong (1963), Tim Liu (1965), Chay Yew (1965) and Justin Chin (1969). These authors mention the intersections between gender, sexuality, race and cultural traditions.

In today's age, the scope of Asian American literature has expanded even further, touching on even more complex topics. These include tensions within mixed-race relationships and how the children of these couples navigate their culturally mixed ideas (Celeste Ng's Everything I Never Told You, 2014), Asian Americans returning to their homeland either for a short while or permanently to reconnect with their heritage (Ruth Ozeki's A Tale for the Time Being, 2013), as well as transracial or transnational adoptions (Celeste Ng's Little Fires Everywhere, 2017; Matthew Salesses's The Hundred-Year Flood, 2015).

== Nuanced definition ==
With the growth of the Asian American literature genre as well as its literary criticism, there has also been an influx of discourse behind the definition of the term.

Some believe that in order for a literary work to be considered Asian American literature, it solely needs to be generated by an American author of Asian descent, with no regard for the subject matter. Contrarily, arguments are also made that just the theme of the piece must relate to the Asian American experience, with the consideration of the creator's background deemed unnecessary.

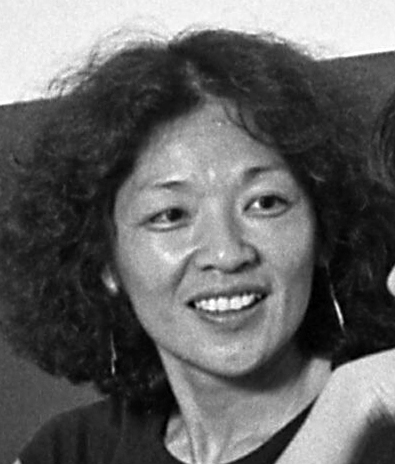
Emma Gee, one of the students that coined the term "Asian American".

== Asian American identity ==
The term "Asian American" was created with the aim of advocating for political solidarity and cultural nationalism. The term was coined by Emma Gee and Yuji Ichioka when they were graduate students at the University of California, Berkeley looking for a name for a student group that combined various students of Asian ethnicities. The creation of the term allowed Asians in the United States to better identify as a subgroup with shared concerns as well as articulate their individuality. In 2000, the U.S. Census defined the term "Asian American" as anyone "with origins in any of the original peoples of the Far East, Southeast Asia, or the Indian subcontinent."

== Characteristics and themes ==
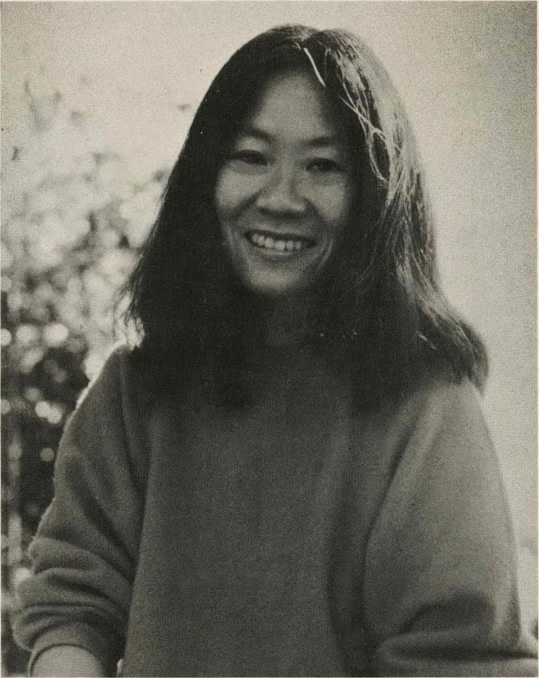
Maxine Hong Kingston Professor Emerita at the University of California, Berkeley

In various works of Asian American literature, themes explored include race, culture, and the search for identity. Despite their subjectivity, they can be confined to gender, sexuality, and age-related norms as well as common discrimination towards individuals of Asian descent.

Though versatile, these themes can vary from one Asian American origin group to another, as Asian Americans are not a monolith. Experiences written within Asian American literature will differ from Filipino-American, Japanese-American, to Vietnamese-American, etc.

Scholar Elaine Kim writes about her own experience living with Asian-American racism in 1950 Washington D.C. As a Korean American teen living in the United States when the Korean, or "Forgotten War" broke out, Kim recounts how peers pitied her due to her cultural background. The US media distributed images of starving and ragged Korean refugees who 'needed' America's help. Kim says her peers were ignorant to the fact Asian Americans could exist, as their identity was not solely Asian, nor were they aware of the division between North and South Korea.

In a recount of her own life as a Korean American, New York Times Bestselling author Cathy Park Hong re-affirms the idea of cognitive dissonance growing up Asian American. Her book Minor Feelings explores how Hong began to question her own cultural background due to American notions about her heritage.

A more recent term, 'The Model Minority Myth', investigates the concept of success associated with specific minority groups. One of the most common associations, are Asian Americans. Being perceived as accomplished within academic or economic experience, the term creates another stereotype for Asian Americans living in the United States.

== Visibility of Asian American literature ==
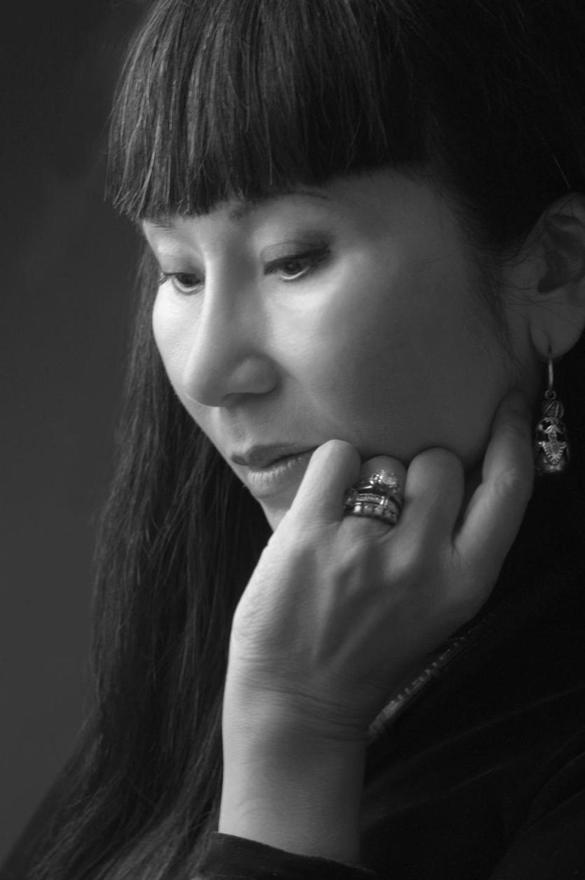
American author of Chinese heritage, best known for the novel The Joy Luck Club (1989), which was adapted into a 1993 film.

Asian American literature was finally categorized in the 1970s. It did not see a major resurgence until CARP's Aiiieeeee! An Anthology of Asian-American Writers (1974), edited by Frank Chin, Jeffery Paul Chan, Lawson Fusao Inada, and others. This anthology helped the field gain ground by recovering previous generations of Asian American authors. As a result, older authors such as Sam Tagatac and Toshio Mori have become prevalent again, gaining new exposure and publication. One of the defining features of CARP's anthology touched upon stereotypes of Asians as a whole: how published work did not receive criticism because the writing did not line up with racial views. This anthology paved a way for authors to write and express feelings of individual identity and crisis concerning racism and helped fight against cultural assimilation, which played a large role (model minority being the biggest example) in the day-to-day life of Asian Americans. However, some critics have challenged CARP's intentions by surfacing their hypocrisy, since the anthology's editors rejected the concept of dual personality and thereby rejected most foreign-born Asians.

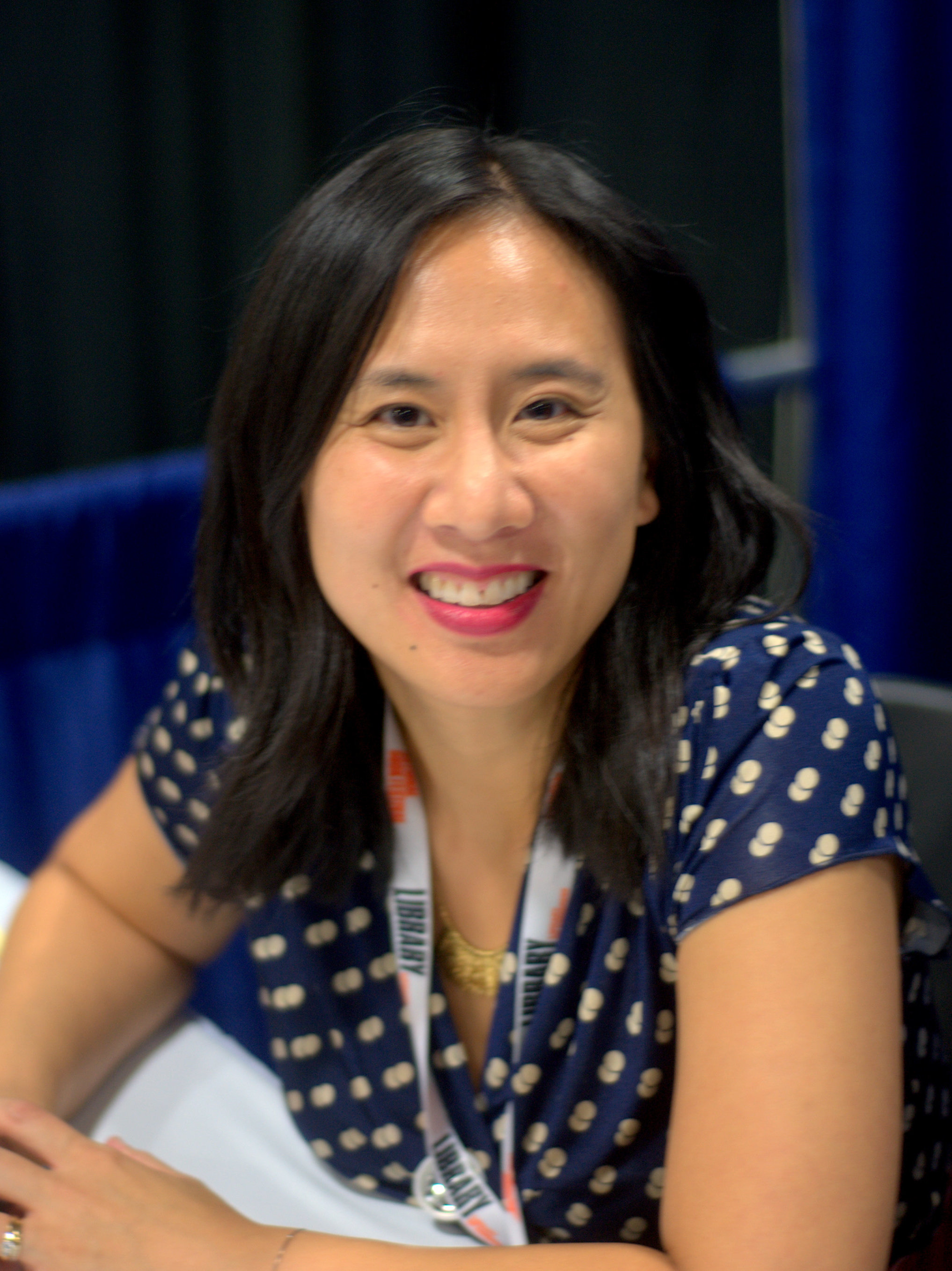
Celeste Ng author of "Everything I Never Told You" and "Little Fires Everywhere," Ng addresses themes of race, identity, and family dynamics in her novels.

One of the most important figures in paving a path for Asian American literature as a legitimate literary field has been Maxine Hong Kingston, whose work has earned widespread notice. Born in Stockton, California as a second generation Chinese American, she published The Woman Warrior in 1976. This story cycle mixed fictional autobiography with Chinese folktales in an attempt to articulate the life of Chinese Americans and the process of self-identity in a liberal world. Her second novel, China Men (1980), is a sequel to The Woman Warrior and also describes the hardships of Chinese settlement in American culture. These two novels gained the attention of many, garnering more empathy and understanding for Chinese Americans. However, Kingston's success also aroused the ire of Frank Chin, who accused her of perpetuating falsehoods about Chinese culture and especially about Chinese and Chinese American men.

In 2025 Arthur Sze became the first Asian American United States Poet Laureate.

In addition to individual writers, multiple organizations were formed in hopes of achieving the same outcome as “Aiiieeeee! An Anthology of Asian-American Writers”. One of them was the Association for Asian American Studies (AAAS), founded in 1979. Its goal is to promote further understanding and professional activity in the field of Asian American Studies, including Asian American literature and literary critics. Extending the theme of visibility to other ethnic and racial issues is a defining feature of the AAAS, but its main goal is advocacy and representation for Asian Americans.

== Asian American Literary Awards ==
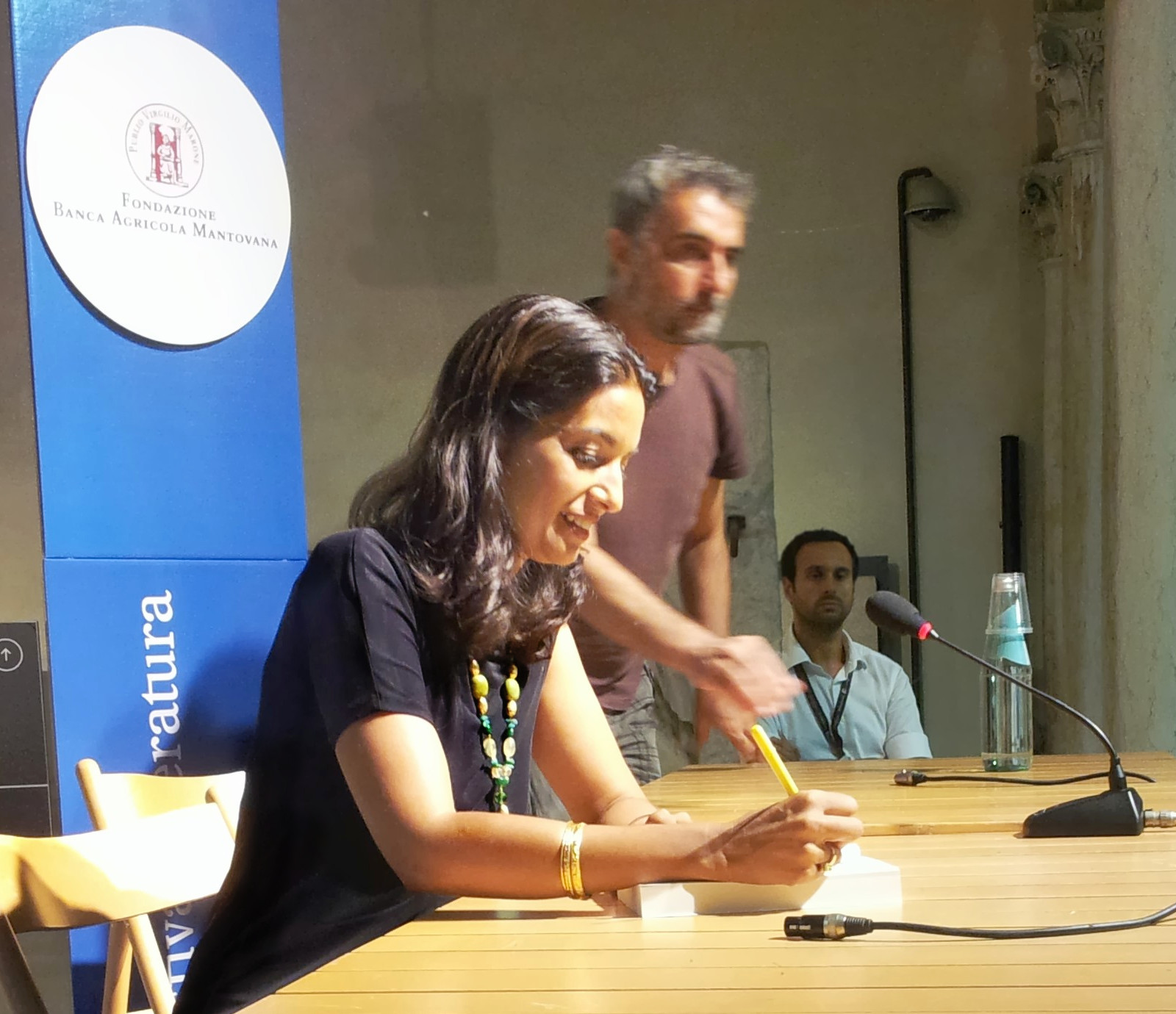
Jhumpa Lahiri acclaimed author, explores Americans and the complexities of cultural identity.

One of the problems associated with Asian American literature is the definition of "Asian American." The Asian American Literary Awards, presented by the Asian American Writers' Workshop, define eligibility "authors of Asian descent". While this definition is clear and concise, this has not stopped them from giving awards to those who have written about Asian Americans, while not being an Asian American. As the event developed, awards extended to groups outside of Asian descent, but the winners are still predominantly Asian. The Association for Asian American Studies (AAAS) has annually awarded Asian American writers at the Book Awards for their contributions in works regarding history, social science, poetry, and prose.

== Asian American authors ==
Since 1998, the Asian American Literary Awards, presented by the Asian American Writers' Workshop, are hosted annually with eligibility for authors of Asian descent. Moreover, the Association for Asian American Studies (AAAS) has annually awarded Asian American writers at the Book Awards beginning in 2009 for their contributions in works regarding history, social science, poetry, and prose.

Some key Asian American authors include:

- Carlos Bulosan
- Frank Chin
- Justin Chin (1969–2015)
- Louis Chu
- Sui Sin Far (1865–1914)
- Maxine Hong Kingston
- Jhumpa Lahiri
- Viet Thanh Nguyen
- David Henry Hwang
- Ha Jin
- Charles Yu
- Jessica Hagedorn
- Gish Jen
- Don Lee
- Chang-Rae Lee
- Janice Mirikitani
- Toshio Mori (1910–1980)
- Bharati Mukherjee
- John Okada (1923–1971)
- Han Ong
- Ocean Vuong
- Don Mee Choi
- Theresa Hak Kyung Cha
- Suji Kwock Kim
- Paul Yoon
- Ruth L. Ozeki
- Celeste Ng
- le thi diem thuy
- Monique Truong
- Adrian Tomine
- Amy Tan
- Shawn Wong
- Shawna Yang Ryan
- Bienvenido Santos
- Lisa See
- SJ Sindu
- Onoto Watanna
- Bryan Thao Worra
- Hisaye Yamamoto (1921–2011)
- Karen Tei Yamashita
- Lois-Ann Yamanaka
- R. Zamora Linmark

== See also ==
- List of Asian American writers
- Chinese American literature
- List of American writers of Korean descent
- Asian American Literary Awards
- Asian/Pacific American Awards for Literature
