= David Hsin-fu Wand =

Chinese-American Poet (1931–1977)

David Happell Hsin-fu Wand (born Wáng Shēnfǔ (Chinese: 王燊甫), also known as David Rafael Wang) (1931–1977) was a poet, translator, collaborator with William Carlos Williams and Ezra Pound, and editor responsible for the popularization of Asian-American literature through his 1974 anthology Asian American Heritage: An Anthology of Prose and Poetry. After espousing virulently neo-fascistic and segregationist views in the 1950s under the tutelage of Pound, Wand moved to California in the 60s and became a supporter of the Black Power movement, seeing parallels between the Asian-American and African-American experience.

== Early life ==
Wand was born on December 28, 1931, in Hangzhou, China, and claimed to be a direct descendant of Tang dynasty poet Wang Wei (699–759). He attended St. John's Middle School in Shanghai, and fled to the United States as a refugee from the Communist Revolution in 1949. While Wand's family was anti-communist, he expressed admiration for Mao's poetry and considered Chiang Kai-shek "an intellectual midget." He graduated from Dartmouth College in 1955, studying English and Italian and joining the Beta Theta Pi fraternity.

In 1955, Wand (writing as David Rafael Wang) began corresponding with Ezra Pound, who was incarcerated at St. Elizabeths Hospital following his arrest and trial for treason against the United States in 1945. In their letters, Wand and Pound discussed their shared interest in Confucius and Chinese written characters, with Wand calling Pound “the greatest poet writing in the English language" and Pound taking particular interest in Wand's name's middle logogram (燊), lifting its meaning "flame-style king" for the ideogram of the 1959 XCVI–CIX (Thrones) Cantos.

== New York ==
=== Correspondences with Ezra Pound ===
After graduating from Dartmouth, Wand moved to New York, where he worked a series of odd jobs while continuing his correspondence with Pound (he visited him at St. Elizabeths in 1956). Increasingly neo-fascistic, antisemitic and segregationist in his worldview, Wand sought Pound for guidance, writing in October 1957, “For eugenics' sake, please tell me what the best books on money issue are." He frequently wrote in praise of far-right activist (and fellow Pound devotee) John Kasper and in support of racial purity and eugenic breeding, exclaiming in a July 12, 1957 letter that:

My impression of the French is that they are of all Europeans the closest to the kikes in spirit and nature. 11 years of living under the French in Shanghai have taught me that they are more beastly than the Japs. The Italians and the Germans were the only Europeans who acted civilized. I am for a united Europe under the rule of either Germany or Italy. Adolf and Benito were certainly close to saints.

Wand believed strongly in male chauvinism, recounting a disagreement with a female friend that "Adolf knew where women should belong more than any other political leaders. Told her that glorification of the ‘New Woman' by murky thinkers like Ibsen and GBS has lead [sic] to family disunity and political chaos in the West." Despite opposition to miscegenation, Wand justified marriage proposals to Marcella Spann and Sheri Martinelli on the grounds that their offspring would be genetically superior.

While Wand expressed hostility for homosexuals and "effeminate" intellectuals, railing against “intellectual molly-coddles," “effeminate weaklings,” “liberaloid eggheads," and “milksop ‘Poundians',” he declared his admiration for physically fit men of action: the "plain jock," "prizefighters and cattlebreeders," and imagined setting up gymnasium-bookstores where men could work out and "exchange ideas and practice target-shooting, which may come in handy later in dealing with the Dulleses and Stevensons etc." He wrote to Pound about his intention to become a sports writer and wrote poems about bodybuilders and Elvis Presley, whom he saw as a hero because he “at least makes one feel like fucking or busting the noses of some spineless poetic jerks like Richard Eberhart and W. H. Auden and murdering some filthy intellectual scumbags like Adlai Stevenson and/or Anthony Eden."

In 1957, Wand organized the “North American Citizens for the Constitution: An Affiliation of the Whib Party" (Whib was an acronym that Pound invented for "Wheat in bread" based on his interest in grain-rites), an intellectual front for John Kasper's segregationist activities that sought to carry his ideas to Ivy League campuses. The NACC supported "racial integrity," states' rights, and the right to bear arms while opposing "the forced integration of races," the NAACP, the Urban League, and the Anti-Defamation League. They accused President Eisenhower of treason and threatened "Marxist, usurer, race-mixer, degenerate politician, we pledge eternal vigilance, eternal combativeness, even death!"

Wand's activities with the NACC compelled a former Dartmouth classmate, David Rattray, to accuse him in a November 1957 issue of The Nation of supporting “the cause of white supremacy" and of “touring the Ivy League colleges with the purpose of setting up White Citizens' councils on the campuses." Wand, in a letter to the editor in December 1957, wrote that

My main purpose in life is to fight against bigotry and racial prejudice while upholding the separate but equal station to which the laws of nature have entitled us. I am strongly against forced integration. I am strongly against miscegenation. I am against those who have lost their racial integrity and desire to be assimilated with the white race.

Wand later suggested that the Nation article cost him his job at a local YMCA, and made him fear deportation to China. Wand's correspondences with Ezra Pound ended in 1958, shortly after Pound's release from St. Elizabeth's and subsequent return to Italy.

=== Collaboration with William Carlos Williams ===
Pound and Noel Stock put Wand in touch with William Carlos Williams after Williams expressed admiration for Wand's English translations of Chinese poetry in Edge, writing that his poems "are worth the trip half way round the world to have encountered.” Wand visited Williams's house in Rutherford, New Jersey, in March 1957 and the two began collaborating on a poetry collection, "The Cassia Tree" (published in New Directions in 1966, after Williams's death), in which Wand provided word-by-word translations of 37 Tang and Song-era poems and Williams turned them into English poems.

Williams encouraged Wand to work on The Grandfather Cycle, a sequence of 101 cantos (mirroring Pound's Cantos) that Wand had begun in 1956. The unfinished work was meant to feature Wand's "fabulous ancestors," including his grandfather Wang Fenggao, one of the last mandarin civil servants and founder of Guanghua University in Shanghai, with "comments on sex, marriage, and prostitution, and references to Eugenics." In one canto, Wand describes his grandfather, the protagonist, and his sexual prowess and diverse progeny:

In Shanghai / by the Yangtze River / Where I watched / the ships / Coming in going out / of the harbor / And the tiny sampans / tremulous on the wave, / I used to sit / beneath the peach blossoms / Near the Lungwha Tower, / with swallows / Dipping over my head / and sandcrabs / Scurrying near my feet / And think about / The epic fornications / of my Fabulous / Grandfather. / Great man! / He sired / Eight sons / and some / Twenty bastards / by / Three wives / and / Four dozen / Concubines / in an age / when virginity / Was the eunuch's lot / and polygamy / the strong man's goal. / His offspring / Multiplied, / Spread from / Hangchow to / London, / Paris to / Mukden— / Some begotten / On ships, / Some made / in sampans; / All different: / Blonde hair, /Grey eyes, / Widow's peak, / Curly beard, / Till even / Tao-Kwan & / T'ung Tse, / the emperors, / became envious of / him, / the plucker of peaches & apple blossoms.

Eliot Weinberger, writing on Wand's artistic influences and outspoken bigotry, notes the difference between his relationship with Pound (who was an outspoken bigot) and Williams (who wasn't):

What interests me [...] is that not only Pound (from whom we expect such things) but Williams and others were not merely tolerating but working with people like Wang in the 1950s—regardless of the daily reports of segregationist violence. That is, although Williams (unlike Pound) probably disagreed with Wang's extremism, his racism and political fanaticism were still considered as minor peccadilloes to be excused in the Artist.

== West Coast ==
Wand left New York for San Francisco in 1958, where he began as a reporter for The Chinese World, a bilingual newspaper based on Chinatown. In 1959, he enrolled in a creative writing program at San Francisco State College, where he continued to work on cantos for The Grandfather Cycle. While spending time at local bookstores, he met Gary Snyder, Philip Whalen, Clarence Major, and Cid Corman.

After receiving his M.A. in 1961, Wand moved to Honolulu, where he taught at both the University of Hawaii and Iolani Preparatory School until 1964. While in Hawaii, Wand became acquainted with Hawaiian and Samoan oral poetry, and published several translations into English.

In 1964, Wand moved to Los Angeles, where he began teaching at Santa Ana College and Santa Monica City College, and then enrolled in the Comparative Literature doctoral program at USC. In an arranged marriage set up by his mother in 1966, he married Yuet-fun and had one daughter.

Of his poetry in the 1960s and 1970s, Wand told James Laughlin, “Other than Mao Tse-tung and two other poets in Hong Kong, I am about the leading modern Chinese poet [...] No other Chinese poet has blended the Greco-Sino-Samurai African tradition in poetry as I have done." Ashe explained, "in my writing I aim at the concision of the Greek epigram, the warmth and geniality of T'ang shih and Sung tz'u, the virility and martial spirit of the Zen-samurai arts, and the form and changes of jazz."

=== Two identities ===
In California, Wand became increasingly outspoken about his twin identities as a poet and an academic, and the separate names—David Rafael Wang and David Hsin-Fu Wand—that corresponded to them. In 1974, he said that

"My role as poet has been kept distinct from my role as professor, and the two identities coexist in a symbiotic relationship much as Dr. Haggard and Mr, Jive. As David Hsin-Fu Wand I am chiefly a critic and teacher of English and comparative literature, while as David Rafael Wang I am a poet, found by most of my friends to be rather anti-intellectual in my poetry.

In 1975, Wand released The Intercourse, a poetry collection that focused heavily on the physicality of the body, including poems about dance, gymnastics, bodybuilding, surfing, bathing, and heterosexual and homosexual encounters. The collection continues to espouse male chauvinist attitudes toward sexuality but also expresses sympathy for the Black Power movement: in one poem, he writes “If you don't get this, man, dig: / Us spade cats will shovel white trash / into the underground furnace of love."

As an academic, completed his doctorate in 1972, entitling his dissertation Cathay Revisited: The Chinese Tradition in the Poetry of Ezra Pound and Gary Snyder. In 1974, he taught at the University of New Mexico, where he incorporated martial arts demonstrations into his lectures about Asian poetry, citing the samurai tradition of the warrior-poet. He expressed admiration for Muhammad Ali and discussed poetry with him during Ali's visit to Albuquerque. At the time of his death, Wand held a Comparative Literature position at the University of Texas at Dallas.

=== Promoting Asian-American literature ===
In 1974, Wand released an anthology of contemporary Asian-American writers entitled Asian-American Heritage: An Anthology of Prose and Poetry, which included works by writers of Chinese, Japanese, Korean and Filipino descent.

Contributors to the anthology include Chung Ling, John Hideyo Hamamura, Sadakichi Hartmann, Richard E. Kim, Kim Yong-Ik, Alexander Kuo, Stephen S. N. Liu, Pardee Lowe, Wing Tek Lum, Suzi Mee, Janice Mirikitani, Toshio Mori, Paul Motoyoshi, Jr., Francis Naohiko Oka, John Okada, Daniel I. Okimoto, Irvin Paik, Jose Garcia Villa, and Hisaye Yamamoto, as well as many translations of Samoan and Hawaiian poetry by Armand Schwerner and Wand himself (credited as David Rafael Wang). Wand justifies including Polynesian oral translations because "Polynesian-American literature [...] belongs to American literature as much as Amerindian lores [...] It belongs to Asian-American literature because Hawaiians and Samoans are native Americans of the fiftieth state, which is geographically a part of Southeast Asia."

In his introduction, Wand explores the question of Asian American identity:

Refusing to be "whitewashed" or "enlightened," these younger Asian-Americans are proud of being Americans of Asian ancestry. While with every word they write they proclaim their identity with Chinatowns or Nihonmachi, they write exclusively in American English, enlivened with the staccato rhythm of jazz. These rebellious young writers have more in common with Elridge Cleaver, Imamu Baraka, George Jackson, and the militant blacks than with Lin Yutang, C.Y. Lee (author of the popular Flower Drum Song), and S.I. Hayakawa, whom they despise.

After describing at length the history of Asian Americans from the 1800s to the present, he concludes by drawing a more explicit parallel between the Asian-American experience and black freedom struggles worldwide:

Unashamed to be yellow, Asian-Americans of the postwar generations tend to align themselves with the Third World Movement. They find their inspiration in Frantz Fanon, author of the Wretched of the Earth, rather than Hayakawa or Lin Yutang. Like the black rebels, with whom they feel a close spiritual affinity, they demand an end to racial injustice and fight for a proper assessment of their ethnic heritage.

In 1975, the Modern Language Association appointed Wand to their Commission on Minority Groups, at the time chaired by critic María Teresa Babín Cortés.

=== Death ===
Wand died on April 7, 1977, during a meeting of the Commission on Minority Groups at the Barbizon Plaza Hotel in New York. Authorities reported that he fell out of his 11th floor window, although whether he committed suicide, fell by accident, or was pushed remains unclear. His autopsy report ruled out foul play.

== Selected bibliography ==
=== As David Hsin-fu Wand ===
Asian-American Heritage: An Anthology of Prose and Poetry. Washington Square Press (1974)

=== As David Rafael Wang ===
“T’ang and Sung Poems”; “Ce-Lia the Immortal Beauty.” Edge 3 (Feb. 1957)

"The Cassia Tree" (with William Carlos Williams). New Directions 19 (1966)

"Funeral Eva," Technicians of the Sacred: A Range of Poetries from Africa, America, Asia, Europe and Oceania (1969)

The Intercourse. Greenfield Review Press (1975)

== Works cited ==
- Wand, David Happell Hsin-Fu. Asian-American Heritage; an Anthology of Prose and Poetry. Washington Square Press, Pocket Books, 1974.
- Witemeyer, Hugh (1986). "The Strange Progress of David Hsin-fu Wand". Paideuma. 15 (2–3): 191–210.
