= Fiona Cheong =

Singaporean-born novelist and academic

- Born: 1961 (age 64–65)
- Education: Cornell University
- Occupation: Associate Professor
- Employer: University of Pittsburgh

Fiona Cheong (born 1961) is a Singaporean-born novelist and academic. Cheong is currently an assistant professor at the University of Pittsburgh since 1995. She has written two novels, The Scent of the Gods (1991), which was nominated for a National Book Award, and Shadow Theatre (2002).

== Education ==
Although her father discouraged Cheong from pursuing a writing career, Cheong earned a B.A. in English and an M.F.A in creative writing from Cornell University. She has taught at Howard University, Cornell University, and at the Hurston-Wright Writers Workshop. She has also been a judge for the Drue Heinz Literature Prize and the Massachusetts Council for the Arts Awards. Alongside her teaching, she is also the co-founder of the Asian American Writers Forum and The Writers of Color Workshop at the University of Pittsburgh.

== Writing ==
Cheong's fiction primarily focuses on adolescent sexuality, postcolonial themes, and politics. Alongside The Scent of the Gods and Shadow Theatre, Cheong's work has also appeared in Charlie Chan Is Dead: An Anthology of Contemporary Asian American Fiction (1993), Tilting the Continent: Southeast Asian American Writing (2000).

She is also writing a book about teaching and writing. In addition to being a fiction writer, Cheong is interested in new ways of teaching students how to write and identifying how writers can overcome writer's block. She addresses the writing process in her graduate-level course, Studio for Creativity.

== Awards ==
Cheong received the Innovation in Education Award from the University of Pittsburgh's Provost Office in 2006. She also received an artist's fellowship from the Pennsylvania Council on the Arts in 2007, and a "Make It Your Own" Award from the Case Foundation for her project, Re-Imagining Our City, in 2008. The project aims to collaborate with youths in the area to create green space for the Hill District.
