= Dogeaters =

1990 novel by Jessica Hagedorn

- First edition
- Author: Jessica Hagedorn
- Cover artist: Stephanie Bart-Horvath
- Language: English
- Genre: Novel
- Publisher: Pantheon Books
- Publication date: March 1990
- Publication place: United States
- Media type: Print (hardback & paperback)
- Pages: 251 pp (first edition, hardback)
- ISBN: 978-0-394-57498-1 (first edition, hardback)
- OCLC: 20056281
- Dewey Decimal: 813/.54 20
- LC Class: PS3558.A3228 D64 1990

Dogeaters is a novel written by Jessica Hagedorn and published in 1990. Hagedorn also adapted her novel into a play by the same name. Dogeaters, set in the late 1950s in Manila (the capital of the Philippines), addresses several social, political and cultural issues present in the Philippines during the 1950s.

The title is a common derogatory term referring to Filipino natives who supposedly eat dogs instead of pork or chicken. The term reflects attitudes within Filipino culture and attempts to become more westernized.

== Characters ==
=== Major characters ===
Rio Gonzaga: the first narrative voice in the novel, which sets the tone for the entire book. In the beginning, she reveals her thoughts and fantasies as a ten-year-old girl. While Rio belongs to the upper class, she has compassion for the lower class. Consequently, she enjoys the company of her grandmother and all the servants. Later, Rio leaves Manila for the United States with her mother and only revisits her childhood home as an adult.

Pucha Gonzaga: Rio's cousin. She enjoys being the center of attention and craves a glamorous life. Although she marries Boomboom Alacran, a wealthy man with good connections, the marriage doesn't last.

Severo Alacran: a self-made man who owns corporations such as TruCola Soft Drinks and SPORTEX. He controls interests in Mabuhay Movie Studios. He has many mistresses including Lolita Luna and sleeps with many of his servants.

Isabel Alacran: Severo Alacran's wife and a former beauty queen.

Rosario "Baby" Alacran: Severo and Isabel's daughter. Unlike her mother, she is plump, shy, and awkward. At 17, she gets pregnant and elopes with Pepe Carreon.

Daisy Avila: a beauty pageant queen. After winning the title of Miss Philippines, she publicly denounces the pageant and becomes involved with political leftist Santos Tirador. Consequently, Daisy is arrested, raped and tortured by General Ledesma and his military men. She later becomes a refugee in the mountains.

Joey Sands: a gay prostitute who works as a DJ at CocoRico. After he witnesses the assassination of Senator Avila, he hides out at Uncle's shack and eventually has help from Boy-Boy to escape the law.

Uncle: adopted Joey after his prostitute mother abandoned him. Uncle teaches Joey the art of stealing and abuses him sexually. Later, he betrays Joey by attempting to sell him out to the authorities.

Orlando (Romeo) Rosales: a self-absorbed man who believes his beauty will grant him fame. In an attempt of pursuing an acting career, he decides one day to end his amorous relationship with Trinidad. On that day, he is mistaken for someone in a group of subversives based in the Cordilleras. Orlando is fatally shot and thus becomes part of the aftermath of the Senator's assassination.

=== Minor characters ===
Andres Alacran: the homosexual owner of CocoRico, a prestige bar that attracts many foreigners and famous people.

Boy Boy: an orphan also taken in by Uncle. During the assassination scandal, Boy Boy helps Joey escape from Uncle and the police.

Sergeant Planas: works for Pepe Carreon and is Uncle's contact in the government. Uncle attempts to betray Joey through the Sergeant.

The President and The First Lady: a corrupt dictator and his wife. Their names are never explicitly mentioned, though there are several allusions to Ferdinand Edralin Marcos and his wife, Imelda Romualdez Marcos. For example, the First Lady's "cultural center" has similarities to the Cultural Center of the Philippines commissioned by Marcos. In an interview in last part of the book, the First Lady discusses her shoes, likely a direct reference to Imelda Marcos's extensive shoe collection.

General Ledesma: a powerful figure who cheats on his wife with the famous movie star Lolita Luna.

Lolita Luna: a famous movie star known for her sexuality and magnificent body. She uses her fame to manipulate powerful men like General Ledesma. She wishes to leave the Philippines for the United States.

Pepe Carreon: works with General Ledesma. He later elopes with Baby Alacran.

Rainer: a famous German director. He has a short relationship with Joey Sands.

Senator Domingo Avila: a politician and human rights activist labeled a leftist by the government. His assassination becomes a great mystery since it is unclear who shot him.

Trinidad Gamboa: a sales associate at SPORTEX who enjoys being associated with the prestigious and wealthy. She dates Romeo.

Cora Camacho: the star of a popular television show; she interviews important figures such as Severo Alacran and Daisy Avila.

== Major themes ==
Dictatorship vs. Anarchy One theme is the clash between dictatorship and anarchy. The President and the First Lady have a foreboding presence throughout the novel that contrasts with the human rights activist Senator Domingo Avila; the Senator protests "crimes against the people" and is thus labeled a "leftist" by the government. Avila's assassination and the resultant coverup that implicates the innocent Romeo demonstrates the government's oppressive nature. These events are juxtaposed with an interview with the First Lady who rationalizes the evidence of their corruption and denies that the Filipino government is a dictatorship.

Marriage Another theme is the achievement of social mobility of Filipino women through marriage. Isabel Alacran, for example, marries Severo because of his power and wealth. Likewise, Isabel is a social asset to her husband and her main job in life is to always appear flawless and polished. Pucha also exhibits this mindset for women.

Beauty Another theme is the importance placed on beauty. Rio's mother, Dolores, follows a strict beauty regimen and uses various products and services in order to remain youthful. Joey also epitomizes this theme as he uses his exotic looks to infatuate customers and procure gifts from them.

Religion Religion seems to be an underlying theme as a few key characters are described as extremely religious. For example, General Ledesma's wife, Leonor, exhibits a monastic lifestyle, with much fasting and prayer, and strives for sainthood. Religion runs so deep in the Gonzaga family that even when Rio's atheist grandfather is dying, the family priest is called. Although Rio does not directly address the role of religion in her life during the novel, in the end she states that her "belief in God remains tentative" and that she "long ago stopped going to church."

American Influence A prevalent theme in the novel is the effect of American influence. Through American movies and music young characters such as Rio and Pucha begin to desire American glamour and its brash style. Filipinos embrace American influence and admire the culture.

Role of Women Within Dogeaters, women are either preoccupied with beauty, as society expects of them, or their education.

Homosexuality Homosexuality is a strong undertone of the novel.

== Reception ==
When the novel Dogeaters was first published in 1990, The New York Times said that it was written with "wit and originality" Another critic argued that the novel is based on Filipino nationalism. In an interview with Ameena Meer, Hagedorn explains: “a lot of Filipinos were upset about that title. This sense of cultural shame came in. I had intended it as a metaphor. I should have fought the whole idea of trying to explain it, which they did on the book jacket. I didn’t want them to define it and I should have stood by my guns, because it’s been creating more trouble than necessary.” Rachel Lee states that Dogeaters "illustrate[s] the transnational legacy of the United States imperialist practices." The San Diego Union stated, "Hagedorn transcends social strata, gender, culture, and politics in this exuberant, witty, and telling portrait of Philippine society."

Dogeaters won an American Book Award in 1990 and was nominated for the National Book Award in 1991.

== Allusions ==
The author uses excerpts from other books, poems and speeches within the novel itself or to signify the start of a new section of the novel.

- Wuthering Heights by Emily Brontë.
- The Philippines by Jean Mallat.
- Poetry by Jose Rizal.
- President William McKinleys "Address to a Delegation of Methodist Churchmen" which provides the stereotypical view Americans have had of Filipinos.

The novel refers to a number of major films:

- All That Heaven Allows
- A Place in the Sun
- Bundle of Joy
- "Jailhouse Rock" by Elvis Presley
- Florante at Laura by Francisco Balagtas
- Rebel Without a Cause
- The Agony of Love
- The Ten Commandments

The novel also refers to a number of iconic American figures:

Actor	Page Number
Shirley Temple	page 88
Barbra Streisand	page 76
Anita Ekberg	page 87
Rita Hayworth	pages 79 and 87
Audrey Hepburn	page 237
Elizabeth Taylor	pages 15 and 17
Elvis Presley	page 222
Sal Mineo	page 51

== Publication history ==
- 1990, USA, Pantheon Books (ISBN 0394574982), March 1990, hardcover (First edition)
- 1991, USA, Penguin Books (ISBN 014014904X), June 1991, paperback

In 1997, Jessica Hagedorn transformed her book into a play. The play was developed in Utah and first premiered in La Jolla, California on September 8, 1998.

== See also ==
- Jessica Hagedorn
- Culture of the Philippines

== Critical Essays ==
- Ashok, S. (2009). Gender, language, and identity in Dogeaters: a postcolonial critique. Postcolonial Text, 5(2).
- D’Alpuget, B. (1990). Philippine dream feast. Review of Dogeaters, by Jessica Hagedorn. New York Times Book Review, 25 Mar 1990.
- Ho, Hannah (2015). The language of depathologized melancholia in Jessica Hagedorn's Dogeaters. South East Asia: A Multidisciplinary Journal, 15, 17–25. (PDF Version).
- Nubla, G. (2004). The politics of relation: creole languages in Dogeaters and Rolling the R's. MELUS Special Issue: Filipino American Literature, 29(1), 199–218.
