= The Gangster of Love =

1996 novel by Jessica Hagedorn

First edition

The Gangster of Love is a novel written by Jessica Hagedorn and published by Houghton Mifflin in 1996.

== Plot ==
"Jimi Hendrix died the year that ship that brought us from Manila docked in San Francisco..." So begins The Gangster of Love, with the arrival of Rocky Rivera, her brother Voltaire and their mother Milagros at San Francisco. Barely just teenagers upon their arrival, the years pass as Rocky and Voltaire begin growing up, finishing school and discovering San Francisco of the 1970s while their mother brings money into the house through several ways from flirtations with several different men, including Zeke, their landlord to the beginning of her catering business, Lumpia X-Press. Rocky has grown into a quiet young woman more comfortable with listening to music and writing in her journals (of which she has several, kept under her mattress) than socializing. One night, Voltaire brings home Elvis Chang, a Chinese-American guitarist, with whom Rocky falls in love and moves in with one week later. Wandering around San Francisco, Rocky meets Keiko Van Heller, an artist who becomes Rocky's friend for life. Soon, Rocky, Elvis and Keiko decide to move to New York City.

The journey begins with a side trip to Los Angeles however, where they encounter Sly and Marlon, Rocky's uncle. Eventually, they make it to New York City where the band grows and through the years they gain more experience in matters of fame, sex, drugs, and life in general, while Rocky's family on the West Coast remains a constant presence over the phone. Rocky's failed pregnancy (she miscarries) acts as the beginning of the end for Rocky and Elvis, a situation exacerbated when Keiko sleeps Elvis. Rocky then moves on to Jake, a Cuban-American sound engineer with whom she has a baby: Venus Rivera Montano. At this time on the West Coast, Voltaire has returned to the Philippines after several stints in the hospital while Milagros, her sister and her brother-in-law have decided to pay New York City a visit, in time for Imelda Marcos's hearing. Soon after however, Milagros's health begins deteriorating and Rocky spends months commuting between her family in New York and at her mother's bedside in San Francisco. When her mother dies, Rocky decides to take a trip to the motherland where she is reunited with her family, including her brother, her sister and her dying father.

The plot is cyclical: the story begins with Rocky and her family leaving Manila and arriving in San Francisco, the narration interspersed with various memories of her life in the Philippines. Upon moving to New York City, Rocky reminisces about her life in San Francisco throughout her daily life. Her recollections increase until she returns to San Francisco to take care of her mother. Her decision to go back to the Philippines is made once in San Francisco, a rather natural choice considering her mother's recent death and the fact that her long-suffering father was finally dying.

=== Narration and Hagedorn's prose style ===
"The Gangster of Love" refers to the name of the band formed by several characters in the novel, including Rocky. The name was inspired by a dream Rocky had after taking acid: "A choir of fat, menacing angels wearing yellow satin robes sang this song by Johnny Guitar Watson called 'Gangster of Love'." While written in English, Hagedorn includes some Tagalog (Filipino words), particularly in the dialogue and goes so far as to use the Filipino as a distinctive characteristic that sets the more Filipino characters apart from the Filipino-Americans.

Though Rocky acts as the first-person narrator for most of the novel, Hagedorn, writes certain portions omniscient narration, once in a while giving the points of view of other characters without the use of first person narration. There are moments in which she even uses the mention of a certain character to introduce said-character's own narration, for instance, when Rocky and Elvis visit her uncle in Los Angeles:

"Marlon studied Elvis Chang – his niece's lover, boyfriend, whatever. Tall and maybe a little too skinny, but pretty enough with that gold hoop in his ear. Elvis Chang, Marlon thought to himself, amused. Elvis Chang in the home of Marlon Rivera. Fucking ridiculous."

Ever the avant-garde, Hagedorn explores the use of poetry, music and playwriting throughout the novel. Once in a while, she makes use of poetry to depict the life, the surroundings of her characters, for example, a description of a ride on the B Train and playwriting; there are two dream-like scenes featuring Rocky, Elvis and Jimi Hendrix.

== Characters ==
=== Major characters ===
Rocky Rivera: the main character and narrator for most of the novel, is a quiet woman forever caught in the "in-betweens". From the very beginning, she is caught between her mother's whimsical move to the Philippines and the father she doesn't really know but still cares for; between Elvis and Keiko, Elvis and the band, the band and the events of daily life; eventually between Jake and Elvis; and most of all, the overwhelming "between" of being an Asian-American. As she grows up, she moves from San Francisco to New York, and finally returns to Manila at the end of the novel.

Voltaire Rivera: Rocky's older brother and the veritable black sheep of the family, dressing and acting the part of the hippie (controversial especially amongst conservative Filipinos). As stated by Rocky herself: "My father once threatened to have Voltaire arrested by the Marcos secret police for looking like an effeminate bakla." (Bakla is Filipino for "homosexual.") Voltaire is a supportive older brother who is also plagued by sumpungs, dark mood swings that end in tantrums and violence, landing him in the hospital on several occasions. Despite Jimi Hendrix as his idol and his bumbling but charming personality, he struggles to adapt to America and is the first of his family to return to the Philippines.

Milagros Rivera: Rocky and Voltaire's mother. She is melodramatic, rash, rather impulsive. She never lets go of her identity as a member of the privileged upper class, even when her family lives far below that status in the United States. "In my childhood, my mother was a volatile presence, vampy, haughty, impulsive," Rocky remembers. In San Francisco, Milagros continues to grasp for power over all around her, over different men, her sister and brother -in-law, her children. Her death is tragic, almost theatrical – her memory and health decline until she wastes away.

Elvis Chang: the skinny, earring-ed, tall, Chinese-American guitarist Voltaire brings home and Rocky quickly falls in love with. He takes the music seriously in the manner of a tortured artist, becoming successful and famous all the way to appearing on MTV. His affair with Keiko, Rocky's miscarriage and artistic differences concerning the band led to the end of Rocky and Elvis.

Keiko Van Heller: Rocky's best friend, she is an artist of mixed origins that she herself cannot clarify: "Keiko told stories of her childhood, stories that kept changing the longer I knew her." They meet on the streets of San Francisco, become inseparable to the point of producing a rather odd, tension-filled triangle between Rocky, Keiko and Elvis. An eccentric character, her relationship with Rocky remains fairly close over the years and despite her affair with Elvis, her rising fame and the birth of Venus, Rocky's baby. Throughout Milagros's decline, Keiko is the one encouraging Rocky to remain in contact with her family on the West Coast.

=== Minor characters ===
Francisco and Luz: Rocky's father and older sister, both of whom remained in the Philippines. Luz lost her mother's favor when she sided with her father and Francisco lost Milagros when he flaunted his mistress in public.

Zeke Akamine: the sad Hawaiian landlord Milagros keeps wrapped around her little finger who remains a steadfast admirer of hers until her death.

Marlon Rivera: Rocky's uncle, an ex-choreographer, Marlon was spending his later years in Los Angeles, as a doting uncle to Rocky and Voltaire.

Sly Stone: Once upon a time, a key member of The Gangster of Love, responsible for arranging gigs and having connections, he and Rocky share a certain amount of animosity. The disbandment of the band led to a more permanent falling-out and readers later found out that Sly was shot to death.

Jake Montano: a Cuban-American sound engineer, he is Venus's father. Though he and Rocky never marry or even move in together, they do love each other and are good parents to Venus.

Jimi Hendrix: His death marks the family's arrival to San Francisco, Voltaire idolizes him to the point of lighting his guitar on fire and he is featured in two dream-like scenes, sitting in a café and speaking with Rocky and Elvis in a rather disconnected manner about music and their lives. In the first scene, occurring before the move to New York, Rocky and Elvis speak as if trying to prove their worth. In the second, after the birth of Venus, Rocky and Elvis are more respectful.

== Themes, motifs and imagery ==
Asia vs. America: "The conflict inevitably boils down in to the same old argument: live in Manila vs. life in America. 'I'm never going back,' my mother vows." Despite Milagros's anger at the Philippines and her vow never to return, she is often frustrated with her life in San Francisco: she has to work in order for the family to survive, that she cannot use her husband's money and influence to, for example, jet-set to Hong Kong wearing designer clothing on a whim. Voltaire floats in and out, detached from the world only to return and returns to the Philippines. Rocky cannot settle the debate between life in Asia and life in America. Her life without her family is completely isolated from any trace of being Asian until she must return to San Francisco for her mother. In matters of love, Rocky continues to disappoint her religious mother by not marrying either of the men she has relationships with, even after having Venus. Rocky's close relationship with Keiko, whom Voltaire falls for, is another source of chagrin to Milagros, incapable of getting away from the conservative views instilled in her as a one-time member of the rather pompous upper class. Rocky goes through life being exotic and having some sense of her identity but never truly able to integrate her Asian side with the American, only able to travel, in a sense of the word, back and forth between the two.

Music: Rocky is an ardent fan of the music of the time and during particularly emotional moments, her narration adopts a lyrical tone, making her everyday life into music. The novel is about the rise and fall of Rocky's band. Music is an essential aspect in both the plot and the style of Hagedorn's prose. She references countless musicians, including Sly and the Family Stone, Smokey Robinson, Aretha Franklin, Jimi Hendrix, George Clinton and Parliament Funkadelic, and Kid Creole and the Coconuts – all as lasting influences on the music The Gangster of Love wants to produce, as well as an influence on the narration.

The yo-yo: The yo-yo was invented in the Philippines, and its name translates as "to return." Rocky travels around searching for herself, for the American dream and the perfect gig, but her search ends in the place she began. Rocky is also a yo-yo when it comes to dealing with the aforementioned in-betweens. She acts as the other characters want her to, but she is always able to return to herself.
