= Dream Jungle =

2003 novel by Jessica Hagedorn

- Author: Jessica Hagedorn
- Language: English
- Subject: Fiction
- Publisher: Viking Adult
- Publication place: United States
- Media type: Hardbound
- Pages: 320
- ISBN: 978-0-670-88458-2

Dream Jungle is a novel by Jessica Hagedorn, a Filipino American author.

The book was published in 2003 by Penguin Viking press.

== Description ==
The book is set in the Philippines in the 1970s. The plot follows Rizalina, a young Filipina girl, and revolves around two events: the purported discovery of a fictionalized stone-age "lost tribe" by a rich, privileged Westerner, and the filming of an extravagant and over-budget Vietnam War film, reminiscent of Apocalypse Now.
