= Russell Leong =

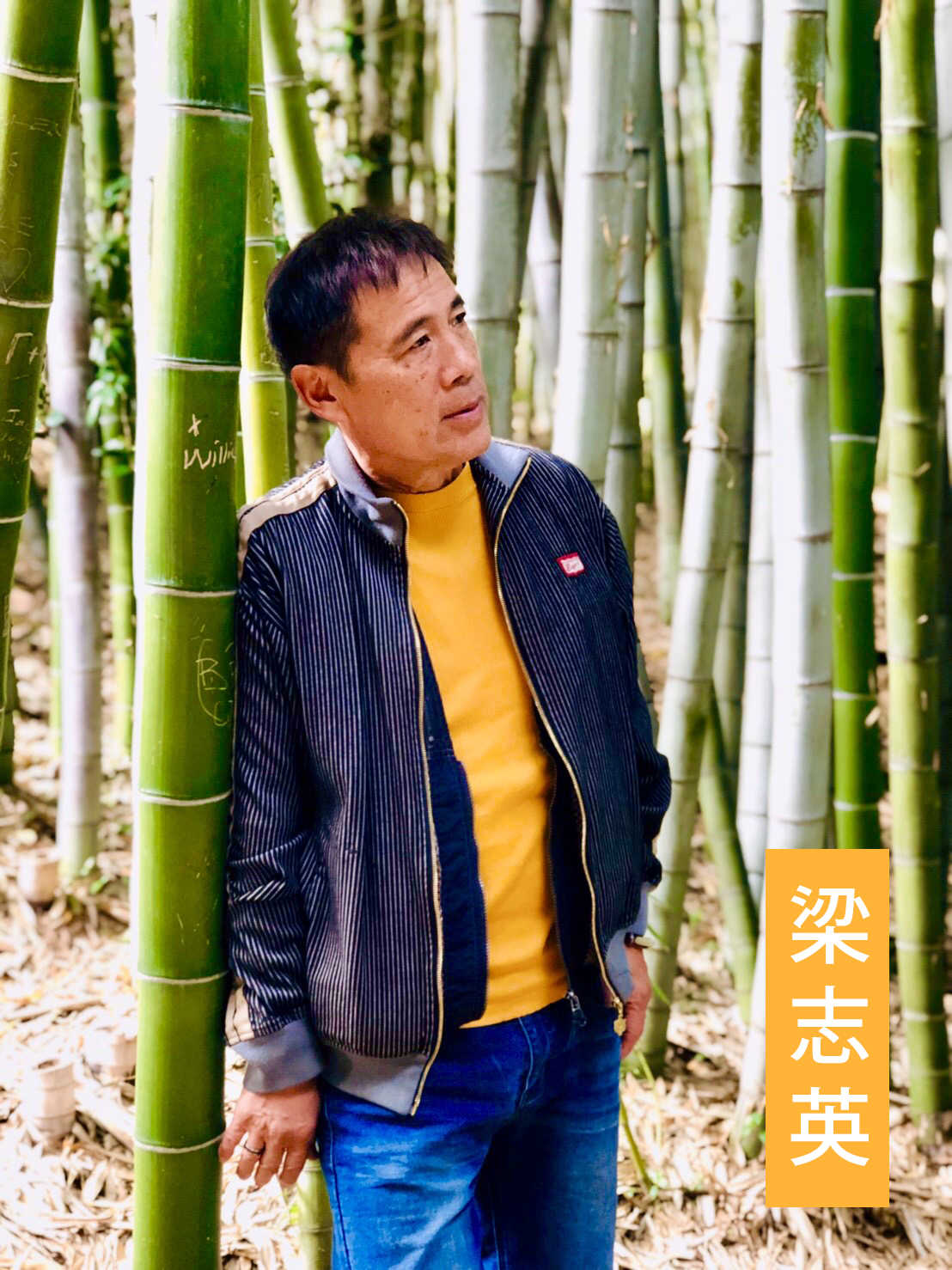
Russell C. Leong

Russell Charles Leong (born 1950) is an academic editor, professor, writer, and long-time Chen-style tai chi student. The long-time editor of Amerasia Journal (1977–2010), Leong was an adjunct professor of English and Asian-American Studies at University of California, Los Angeles and currently serves as senior editor for international projects. He is the founding editor of the CUNY FORUM: Asian American / Asian Studies, published by the Asian American / Asian Research Institute - CUNY, and served as a Dr. Thomas Tam Visiting Professor at Hunter College/CUNY. He is the author of Phoenix Eyes and Other Stories (University of Washington Press, 2000) which received the American Book Award. His most recent publication, MothSutra, a graphic poem about New York City restaurant bicycle deliverymen, was released in 2015.

== Early life ==
Leong was born in Chinatown, San Francisco. Leong attended local Chinese and American schools where his English teachers and family encouraged him to write.

In 1972, he received his B.A. from San Francisco State University, where he took one of the first Asian/American writing classes from Jeffery Paul Chan. Linking art with social and political activism for Asian-Americans, Leong participated in the Kearny Street Workshop. From 1973 to 1974, Leong studied at the National Taiwan University before earning an MFA from the University of California, Los Angeles in 1990.

== Career ==
Leong was the editor of Amerasia Journal (1977–2010), and an adjunct professor of English and Asian-American Studies at University of California, Los Angeles

From 2012–2013, Leong served as a Dr. Thomas Tam Visiting Professor at Hunter College, CUNY in New York City. He is the founding editor of CUNY FORUM: Asian American / Asian Studies, published by the Asian American / Asian Research Institute - CUNY.

Leong is also the editor and project coordinator for the U.S.-China media brief, published by the UCLA Asian American Studies Center.

In 2015, Leong published "Mothsutra: For Those Who Delivery Food on Bicycles / New York City," a visual graphic portfolio of his poetry and drawings. "MothSutra" was performed at the Bowery Poetry Club NYC and at the City University of New York's Asian American / Asian Research Institute. It will be published as an e-book by the UCLA Asian American Studies Center.

== Personal life ==
Leong has a "life is war" ideology representing his dislike towards the academic community. He would like to see himself more as an activist than an academic. Leong's religious views relate most strongly to Buddhist philosophy. Buddhism applies to many aspects of his life including relationships and writing. He agrees with the accepting nature of Buddhism and finds it a strong, but not oppressive set of values to incorporate in daily life.

== Full Oeuvre ==
=== Selected works ===
- Mothsutra: For Those Who Deliver Food on Bicycles / New York City
- Phoenix Eyes and Other Stories
- The Country of Dreams and Dust
- My Chinatown A to Z

=== Fiction, Memoir and Poetry ===
- "No Bruce Lee"
- "Looking after Hands"
- "Enter the Year of the Dragon"
- "Haishan"
- "The Story of Haishan"
- "Memories of Stone Places"
- "Fish don't wear no hats"
- "A Yin and Her Man"
- "Litany"
- "Geography One"
- "The Painted Branch"
- "Aloes"
- "Clay"
- "Granite"
- "Sail"
- "Unfolding Flowers, Matchless Flames"
- "In the Country of Dreams and Dust"
- "Beware of the M Word"
- "Aerogrammes"

=== Video Documentaries on Writers ===
- NVM Gonzalez: A Story Yet to be Told, 1998, 30 minute video documentary on national writer of the Philippines, premier, David Henry Hwang Theatre, L.A. December 9, 1998
- Why is Preparing Fish a Political Act? Poetry of Janice Mirikitani, 1990, director and editor. Selected for the National Asian Pacific American Asian Cine Vision Video Festival, New York City aired on Manhattan Cable, 1991.
- Morning Begins Here, video documentary on San Francisco Chinatown, screened at the 1985 RIFE International Film and Video Festival, Czechoslovakia. Aired on Channel 18 on Chinese television, Los Angeles, 1986.
- Reviews of Literary Work
- "Chinese Characters in the Diaspora: Russell Charles Leong," by Stella Dong, in South China Morning Post, May 30, 2004 (Hong Kong)
- "Writing the Chinese and Southeast Asian Diasporas in Russell Leong's Phoenix Eyes," by Walter S.H. Lim, in Asian Diaspora: Cultures, Identities, Representations, edited by Robbie Goh and Shawn Wong (Hong Kong University Press, 2004)
- "Art, Spirituality, and the Ethic of Care: Alternative Masculinities in Chinese American Literature," by King-kok Cheung, in Masculinity Studies, Feminist Theory, New Directions, edited by Judith Kegan Gardiner (Columbia University Press, New York, 2002)
- "Acts of Reclamation" by Sue Russell in the Kenyon Review (Winter 1995, volume XVII, no. 1)
- "L.A. and Other Fictions," by Nina J. Easton, Los Angeles Times Magazine (September 5, 1993.)
- "Walls and Bridges," by Steven A. Chin, San Francisco Examiner Image Magazine (November 14, 1993). Author profile and poem.
- "Fresh Harvest: Multicultural Poetry from a Nation of Immigrants," by Sesshu Foster, in Northwest Review, 1994.
- Biography and writers statement in Contemporary Authors.
- Author Interview in Words Matter: Conversations with 20 Asian American Writers, edited by King-kok Cheung (University of Hawaii Press, Spring 2000).
- Review of Phoenix Eyes in Los Angeles Times, by Jonathan Kirsch in West Words, Los Angeles Times, August 23, 2000.
- Interview and review in International Examiner, September 5, 2000, vo. 27:16.
- Interview and article in Pots Magazine, Taipei, Taiwan, December 7. 2001.
