= The Scent of the Gods =

- Author: Fiona Cheong
- Language: English
- Publisher: W. W. Norton & Co Inc
- Publication date: 1991

The Scent of the Gods is a novel by Singapore-born writer Fiona Cheong, first published in 1991 by W. W. Norton & Co Inc. It is an account of an 11-year-old young girl's coming of age in the formative years of Singapore in the 1960s.

== Plot synopsis ==
Taking place in the 1960s during Singapore's formative years as a young independent republic, the novel traces the growth and sexual maturation of young Esha (also named Su Yen) as she grows up an orphan reared by the matriarch of her extended clan, known only as Grandma, and schooled in a Catholic missionary school. Her two older cousins, Li Shin and Li Yuen, are her constant companions. Narrated in the first person, the novel is notable for its use of limited perceptive; major events in the narrative are not totally explained – for instance, in the disappearance of her paternal uncle Tien, and Li Shin's death.
