= Aiiieeeee! An Anthology of Asian-American Writers =

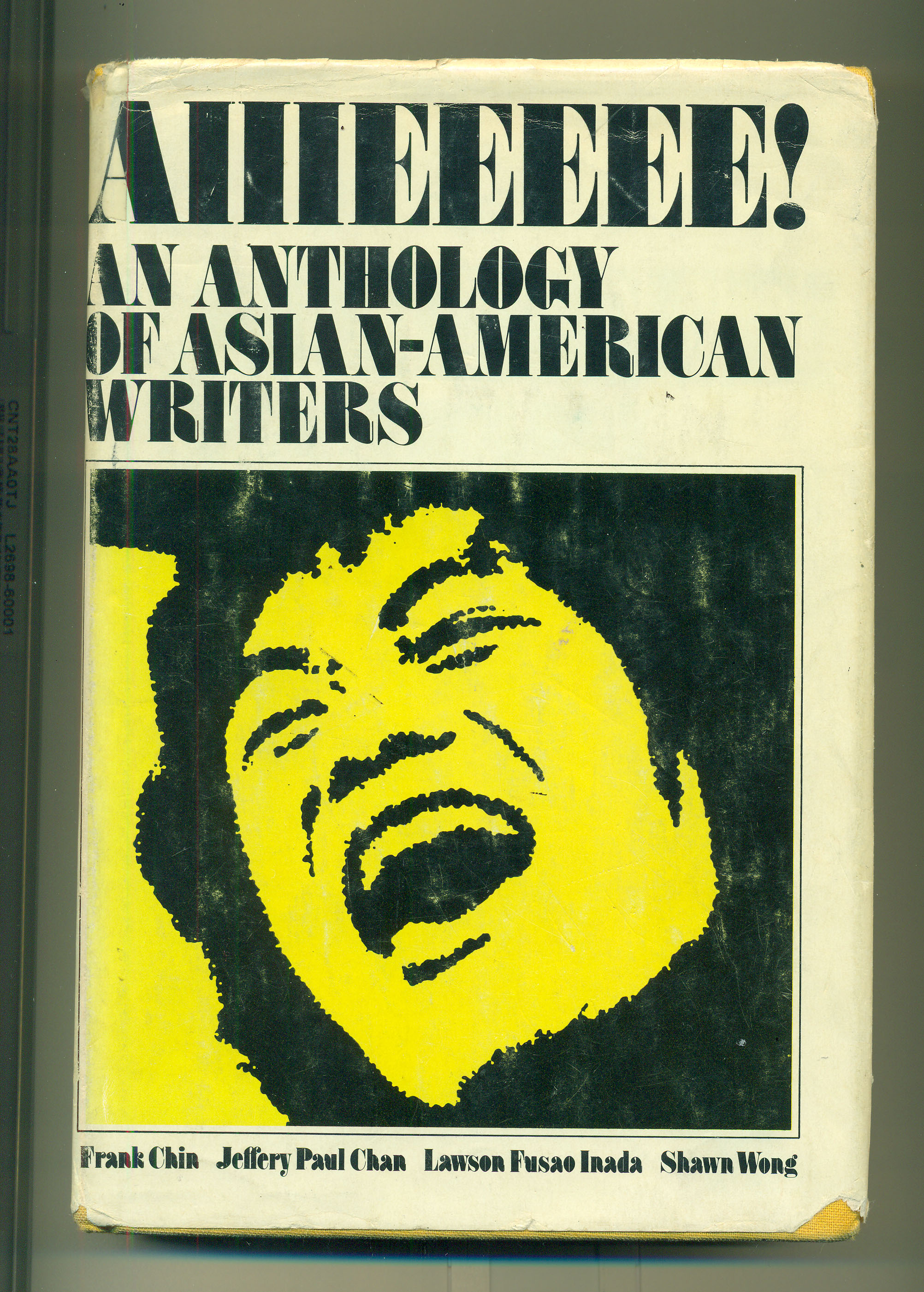
- Author: Frank Chin, Jeffery Paul Chan, Lawson Fusao Inada, Shawn Wong
- Language: English
- Genre: anthology, Asian American
- Publisher: Howard University Press
- Publication date: 1974
- Publication place: United States
- Pages: 200
- Followed by: The Big Aiiieeeee!

Aiiieeeee! An Anthology of Asian-American Writers is a 1974 anthology by Frank Chin, Jeffery Paul Chan, Lawson Fusao Inada, and Shawn Wong, members of the Combined Asian American Resources Project (C.A.R.P.). It helped establish East Asian American literature as a field by recovering and collecting representative selections from Chinese, Japanese, and Filipino Americans from the past fifty years—many of whom had been mostly forgotten. This anthology included selections from Carlos Bulosan, Diana Chang, Louis Chu, Momoko Iko, Wallace Lin, Toshio Mori, John Okada, Oscar Peñaranda, Sam Tagatac, Hisaye Yamamoto, Wakako Yamauchi, many of whom are now staples in East Asian American literature courses. Because of this anthology and the work of C.A.R.P., many of these authors have been republished. At that time, however, they received little attention from publishers and critics because they did not subscribe to popular stereotypes but depicted what Elaine H. Kim calls the "unstereotyped aspects of Asian American experience". The "aiiieeeee!" of the title comes from a stereotypical expression used by East Asian characters in old movies, radio and television shows, comic books, etc. These same stereotypes affected the anthology itself: when the editors tried to find a publisher, they had to turn to a historically African-American press because, as Chin states:

The blacks were the first to take us seriously and sustained the spirit of many Asian American writers.... [I]t wasn't surprising to us that Howard University Press understood us and set out to publish our book with their first list. They liked our English we spoke [sic] and didn't accuse us of unwholesome literary devices.

The anthology is also notable for its opening essay, "Fifty Years of Our Whole Voice", which laid out a list of concerns facing East Asian American writers—orientalism, monolingualism, ghettoed communities, class issues etc.—that have become important for East Asian American scholarship. The essay also lays out the editors' understanding of what constitutes "a true Asian American sensibility": namely, that it is "non-Christian, nonfeminine, and nonimmigrant". These stances have been controversial, especially after the rise of East Asian American women's literature (Maxine Hong Kingston, Amy Tan et al.) and the change in East Asian American demographics in the 1980s, when more Asian American writers were immigrants and/or from other Asian cultures (e.g. Korean, Indian, Vietnamese).

== The Big Aiiieeeee! ==
An expanded edition, The Big Aiiieeeee! was published in 1991 and added such authors as Sui Sin Far, Monica Sone, Milton Murayama, Joy Kogawa and others. It was even less representative of the variety of East Asian cultures now active in the United States (it no longer contained any Filipino works), and it remained firm in its insistence on certain qualities as essential for determining "true" East Asian American identity. These ideas are forcefully presented in Chin's introductory essay, "Come All Ye Asian American Writers of the Real and the Fake", in which he argues that Kingston, Tan, David Henry Hwang, and other popular Chinese American writers are not authentically East Asian American, but rather follow the tradition of such mid-century Chinese American authors as Yung Wing and Jade Snow Wong, who wrote autobiographies (which Chin claims is "an exclusively Christian" genre) that accept "the Christian stereotype of Asia being as opposite morally from the West as it is geographically."

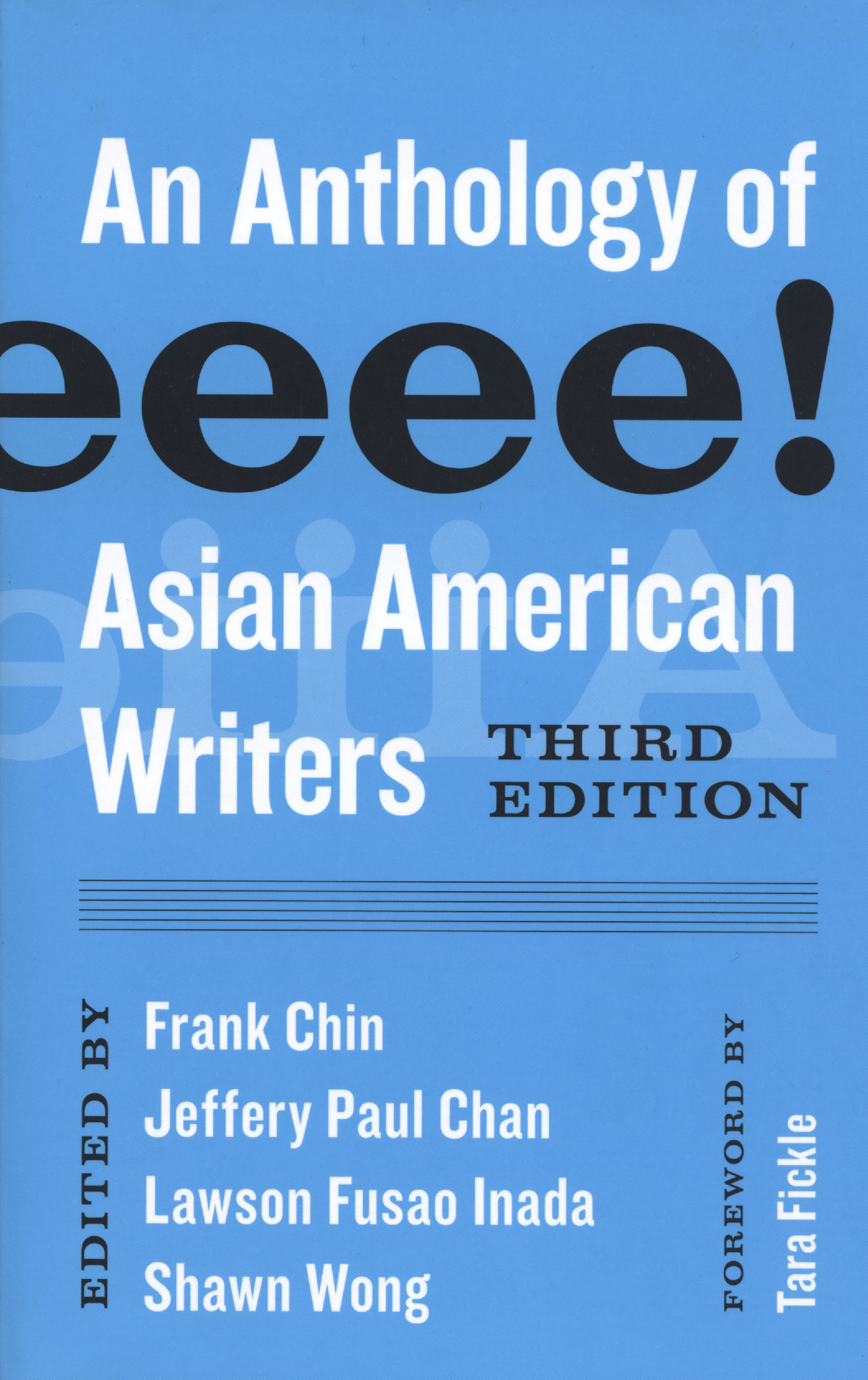
3rd Edition of Aiiieeeee!, 2019.

== See also ==
- Asian American literature
- Chinese American literature
- List of Asian American writers
- List of American writers of Korean descent

== Additional sources ==
- David Leiwei Li devotes an entire chapter to Aiiieeeee! in his book Imagining the Nation: Asian American Literature and Cultural Consent. Stanford UP. 1998. pp. 1–43. ISBN 0-8047-3400-3.
- Partridge, Jeffrey F. L. and Shawn Wong. "Aiiieeeee! And the Asian American Literary Movement: A Conversation with Shawn Wong." MELUS 29.3/4 (2004): 91-102, accessed 14 August 2010.
