= Toshio Mori =

American author (1910–1980)

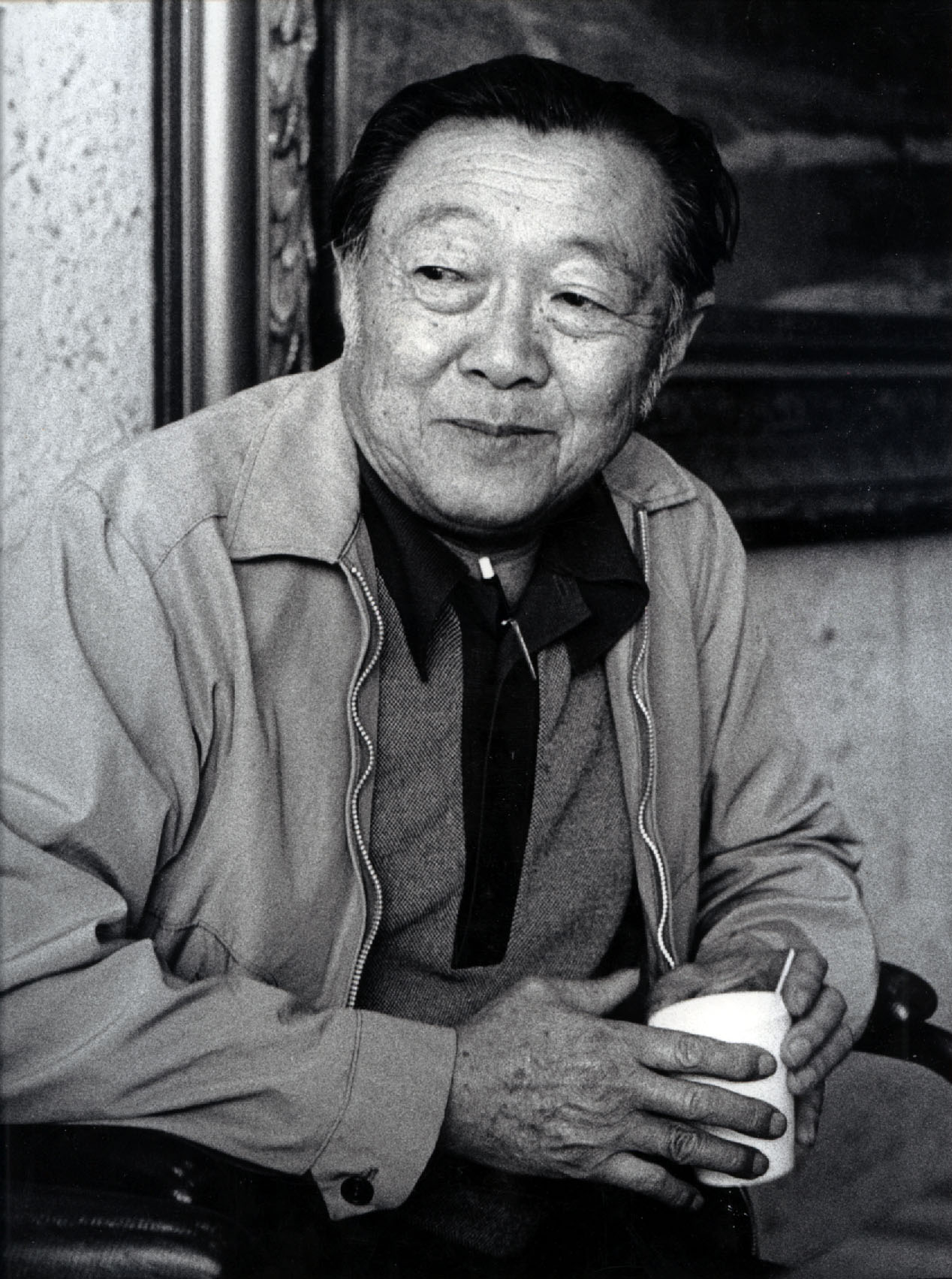
- Mori in 1975
- Born: March 3, 1910; Oakland, California, US
- Died: April 12, 1980 (aged 70); San Leandro, California, U.S.
- Occupation: Author

Toshio Mori (Japanese: 森 壽夫, March 3, 1910 – April 12, 1980) was an American author, best known for being one of the earliest (and perhaps the first) Japanese–American writers to publish a book of fiction.

== Biography ==
Mori was born in Oakland, California to Japanese immigrants Hidekichi Mori (1871–1951) and Yoshi Takaki (1869–1946).

He grew up in San Leandro. In spite of working long hours at his family's garden nursery, Mori endeavored to become a writer and managed to publish his first story "The Brothers" in The Coast magazine when he was 28 years old. He had a tentative publication date set for his collection of stories Yokohama, California when World War II broke out, which brought the publication process to a halt.

During World War II, following the signing of Executive Order 9066, he and his family were interned at Topaz War Relocation Center in Utah, where Mori edited the journal Trek for a year. In 1943, Mori met and married Berkeley, California native Hisayo Yoshiwara (1915–2003). They had a son, Steven Mori.

After the war, Mori returned to the Bay Area where he continued to write. He is the author of Yokohama, California (1949), The Chauvinist and Other Stories (1979), and The Woman from Hiroshima (1980). Mori worked most of his adult life in a small family nursery. He was posthumously named an American Book Award winner for Yokohama, California in 1986.

Toshio Mori died on April 12, 1980, in San Leandro, California. He was cremated and buried at Chapel of the Chimes Columbarium and Mausoleum in Oakland, California.

== Writing style ==
Though Mori was a short story fiction writer, his stories often echoed and reflected the life of Japanese Americans in pre and postwar America. Imbued with wonderment at the everyday routine of the people around him, Mori's stories told of seemingly menial situations that emphasized the emotional connections and culture that all Americans share, regardless of their racial background. This tone was one of the main reasons why Mori's work was so successful; it was accessible to more than just the Japanese American community. Even Mori's work while in the internment camp was from the 'optimistic perspective', a style of writing in the internment camps which encouraged Japanese Americans not to be pessimistic and have faith in the American democratic system.

Though the majority of Mori's work was considered lighthearted and even comical, some of his works did emphasize the taut emotional strain that a Japanese American felt, before, after and during the war. Most of his works prewar described the slightly comical problems that a Japanese American dealt with on a daily basis, trying to balance their Japanese culture with the American one. During his internment, Mori's tone occasionally became dark, especially in a short story dedicated to his brother (who was badly injured in the 442nd Regimental Combat Team) which describes a fight between brothers over patriotic duty to their country.

== Bibliography ==
=== Primary sources ===
- Mori, Toshio. New Directions in Prose & Poetry. Ed. James Laughlin. Middlebury, VT, Otter Valley Press, 1938.
- Yokohama, California, ID: The Caxton Printers, Ltd., 1949. Intro. by William Saroyan.
- "Tomorrow is Coming, Children" Trek. Eds. Jim Yamada, Taro Katayama, and Marii Kyogoku. Topaz Internment Camp, Utah. 1.1 and 1.2 (Christmas 1942/1943): 13–16.
- "The Woman Who Makes Swell Doughnuts." Aiiieeeee! An Anthology of Asian-American Writers. Ed. Lawson Fusao Inada, et al.. Washington D.C., 1974. 123.
- Woman from Hiroshima. San Jose, CA: Isthmus Press, 1979.
- The Chauvinist and Other Stories. Los Angeles: Asian American Studies Center of University of California, Los Angeles, 1979.
- Yokohama, California. 2nd ed., Seattle: University of Washington Press, 1985. New intro. by Lawson Fusao Inada.
- "Japanese Hamlet." Imagining America: stories from the promised land. Ed. by Wesley Brown & Amy Ling. New York : Persea Books, 1991. 125–127.
- "The Chauvinist." Charlie Chan Is Dead: An Anthology of Contemporary Asian American Fiction. Ed. by Jessica Hagedorn. New York, N.Y: Penguin Books, 1993. 328–337.
- "Through Anger and Love." Growing up Asian American, An Anthology. Ed. by Maria Hong. New York: W. Morrow, 1993. 53–64.

Unpublished novels

- Send These the Homeless (written in Topaz camp in 1942)
- The Brothers Murata (original title "Peace Be Still" completed 1944)
- Way of Life (written during the 1960s)

=== Secondary sources ===
- Barnhart, Sarah Catlin. "Toshio Mori (1910–1980)" Asian American Novelists: A Bio-Bibliographical Critical Sourcebook. Ed. Emmanuel S. Nelson. Westport, CT: Greenwood; 2000. 234–39
- Bedrosian, Margaret. "Toshio Mori's California Koans." MELUS: 15.2 (1988): 47–55.
- Hassell, Malve von. Ethnography, Storytelling and the Fiction of Toshio Mori. Dialectical Anthropology, 1994; 19.4: 401–18.
- Palomino, Harue. Japanese Americans in Books or in Reality? Three Writers for Young Adults Who Tell a Different Story. "How Much Truth Do We Tell the Children? The Politics of Children's Literature." Ed. Betty Bacon. Minneapolis: Marxist Educational Press; 1988. 257.
- Mayer, David R. "Akegarasu and Emerson: Kindred Spirits of Toshio Mori's "The Seventh Street Philosopher." Amerasia Journal, 1990; 16.2: 1–10.
- The Philosopher in Search of a Voice: Toshio Mori's Japanese-Influenced Narrator. AALA Journal, 1995; 2: 12–24.
- "The Short Stories of Toshio Mori." Fu Jen Studies: Literature and Linguistics, 1988; 21: 73–87.
- "Toshio Mori and Loneliness." Nanzan Review of American Studies 15 (1993): 20–32.
- "Toshio Mori's Neighborhood Settings: Inner and Outer Oakland." Fu Jen Studies: Literature and Linguistics, 1990; 23: 100–115.
- "Toshio Mori's '1936': A True and a False Prophecy." Academia: Bungaku Gogaku Hen/Literature and Language, 1999 Sept; 67: 69–81.
- "Can't See the Forest: Buddhism in Toshio Mori's 'The Trees." Academia: Bungaku Gogaku Hen/Literature and Language, 2002 Jan; 71: 125–36.
- Palumbo Liu, David. "Universalisms and Minority Culture." Differences: A Journal of Feminist Cultural Studies 7.1 (1995): 188–208.
- Sato, Gayle K. "(Self) Indulgent Listening: Reading Cultural Difference in Yokohama, California." Japanese Journal of American Studies, 2000; 11: 129–46.
- Sledge, Linda Ching. "Reviewed Work(s): The Chauvinist and Other Stories by Toshio Mori." MELUS 7.1 (Spring 1980): 86–90.
- Wakida, Patricia. "Unfinished Message" Selected Works of Toshio Mori. The Review of Arts, Literature, Philosophy and the Humanities (RALPH). Volume XXIV.2 (Spring, 2001).
