= Kiana Davenport =

American writer

Kiana Davenport (born Diana Davenport in Honolulu, Hawaii) is an American author of part-Hawaiian ancestry. She is the author of critically acclaimed novels Shark Dialogues (1994) and Song of the Exile, both of which explore aspects of life as a Polynesian in Western society. Her most recent novel was the bestselling House of Many Gods. All three books are connected combining Hawaiian family saga with references to Hawaiian political and social history from the 18th century to present days. She has also written two Kindle eBooks namely "House of Skin" and "Cannibal Nights". The latter was released in July 2011.

Her novel The Spy Lover recounts the story of a Chinese immigrant soldier, Johnny Tom, caught in the tumult of U.S. Civil War. The novel is based on the author's family history. Published by Thomas & Mercer, the book was released on 28 August 2012. The Soul Ajar: A Love Story, was published in October 2014.

She was also a 1992-93 Fiction Fellow at the Bunting Institute at Harvard-Radcliffe. Her novels have been translated into fourteen languages. Her short stories have been included in "The O. Henry Awards Anthologies", "The Pushcart Prize Collection", and "The Best American Short Stories, 2000". She has received the Eliot Cades Awards in Literature, and a writing Fellowship from the National Endowment for the Arts.
