= Jeffery Paul Chan =

American author and scholar (1942–2022)

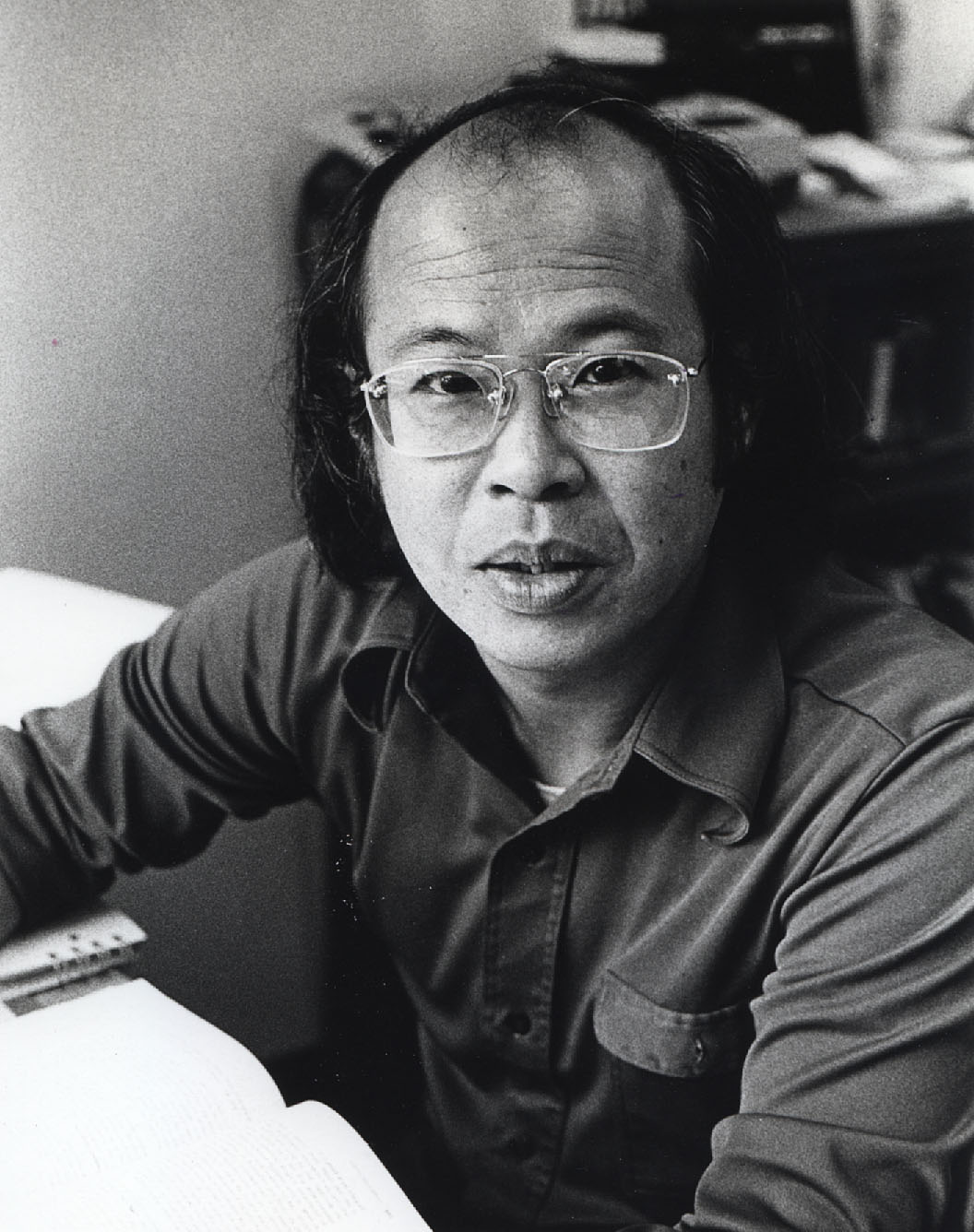
- Chan in 1975
- Born: Jeffery Paul Chan; August 19, 1942; Stockton, California
- Died: January 11, 2022 (aged 79); San Rafael, California
- Education: San Francisco State University
- Occupations: Author; scholar; professor; critic
- Writing career
- Notable work: Aiiieeeee! An Anthology of Asian-American Writers
- Literary movement: Asian American

Jeffery Paul Chan (August 19, 1942 – January 11, 2022) was an American author and scholar. He was a professor of Asian American studies and English at San Francisco State University for 38 years until his retirement in 2005.

== Biography ==
Chan was born in the U.S. to Chinese immigrants and graduated from Harry Ells High School intending to pursue medicine. As an undergraduate at the University of California, Berkeley, he studied literature instead and in 1973, completed his master's degree in creative writing at the San Francisco State University. He co-founded its Asian American studies department and twice served as first chair of the department. With fellow authors Frank Chin, Lawson Fusao Inada, and Shawn Wong, Chan edited two editions of the groundbreaking anthology of Asian American literature, Aiiieeeee! An Anthology of Asian-American Writers, which helped introduce Asian American authors as worthy of serious study. This quartet had formed the Combined Asian Resources Project (CARP) to accomplish this task, which helped reintroduce and posthumously republish older works by Asian American authors, such as John Okada's No-No Boy and Louis Chu's Eat a Bowl of Tea, for which Chan penned a forward (foreword). Chan also coined the term racist love (with Chin) to express the ways Asians are stereotyped in overly-positive ways that are just as damaging as the negative stereotypes used against blacks, Latinos and Native Americans. His brother is Michael Paul Chan, an actor, and a founding member of the Asian American Theater Company, where Frank Chin was a leading figure, and where Jeffery Paul served on the Board of Directors for the company. Chan also wrote a comedic play, "Bunnyhop", which was produced by East West Players during their 1977–1978 season. After a battle with cancer, Chan died on January 11, 2022, at the age of 79.

== Bibliography ==
- Auntie Tsia Lays Dying (1972), printed in Asian American Authors (Kai-yu Hsu and Helen Palubinskas, editors)
- A Night on Lead Mountain: Short Stories (1974), submitted for his master's degree
- Jackrabbit (1974), printed in Yardbird Reader Volume 3 (Frank Chin and Shawn Wong, editors)
- Aiiieeeee! An Anthology of Asian-American Writers (1974) (Co-editor, contributor)
- Introduction to Eat a Bowl of Tea (1979), Chan's introduction was written for the University of Washington Press reprinting
- Cheap Labor (1982), a short story published by Bamboo Ridge press
- The Big AIIEEEEE!: An Anthology of Chinese American and Japanese American Literature (1991) (Co-editor, contributor)
- The Chinese in Haifa (1993), printed in the anthology Charlie Chan Is Dead, (Jessica Hagedorn, editor)
- Eat Everything Before You Die: A Chinaman In The Counterculture (novel; 2004) Seattle: University of Washington Press
- "I'm a Chinaman": An Interview with Frank Chin (1970) (interview originally published in the out of print weekly newspaper East/West, re-printed in Chinese American Voices: From the Gold Rush to the Present; 2006) University of California Press

== See also ==
- List of Asian American writers
