= Stella Dong =

Stella Dong is the author of many historical books on China, most notably Shanghai 1842-1949: The Rise and Fall of a Decadent City (Harpers), Peking: Heart of the Celestial Empire (Formasia) and Sun Yat-sen: Enigmatic Revolutionary (Formasia). Born in Seattle, she worked for several magazines before her first book. She is known for her perceptive articles on Chinese-American writers, and has a regular column on American-Asian cultural affairs in Hong Kong's South China Morning Post. She has also written for the New York Times and Washington Post.
