= Dwight Okita =

American dramatist

Dwight Holden Okita (born August 26, 1958) is a Japanese-American memoirist, novelist, and poet. His work reflects his experiences as a third-generation Japanese-American (sansei), a gay man, and a Nichiren Buddhist. He studied English literature at the University of Illinois, Chicago. His first book of poems, Crossing with the Light, was published in 1992, and nominated for Best Asian Literature Book of 1993. His plays include Salad Bowl Dance, commissioned in 1993 by the Chicago Historical Society; Richard Speck, commissioned in 1991 by the American Blues Theater; and The Rainy Season, produced in 1993. His novels include The Hope Store (2017) and THE PROSPECT OF MY ARRIVAL (2011) which was a finalist in the Amazon Breakthrough Novel Awards. He won a Joseph Jefferson Award in 1996 for the collaborative play The Radiance of a Thousand Suns, which he wrote with Anne McGravie, Nicholas Patricca, and David Zak.
