= Sylvia Watanabe =

American writer of Japanese origin

Sylvia Watanabe is an American writer of Japanese origin. She obtained a BA from the University of Hawaii at Manoa and an MA from Binghamton University. Her collection of ten short stories, Talking to the Dead received acclaim for a number of those pieces, and led the title story to become included among five finalists nominated for the 1993 PEN Faulkner Award. In, "Change and Tragedy in a Hawaiian Village," it was reviewed by R.A. Sasaki in the September 6, 1992, San Francisco Chronicle, regarding the tensions between culture and tradition and change and modernization.

She has also received an NEA fellowship, a Josephine Miles PEN Oakland award, and an Arts Council grant. Watanabe's writings have also appeared in numerous anthologies, including those for the O. Henry Award and the Pushcart Prize.

Watanabe is also noted for her work on Asian American fiction. Along with the late publisher Carol Bruchac, she co-edited two volumes of Asian American fiction titled Home to Stay and Into the Fire. She was an assistant professor in creative writing at Oberlin College, promoted to professor for the 2015-2016 academic year, but has since retired.

== Personal ==
Watanabe was born in Wailuku, Maui, in 1953. She was raised in Kailua, Oahu. Her grandfather was a Presbyterian Minister for 35 years in Maui, who despite that, was interned in a Second World War camp in New Mexico. She earned a B.A. degree in Art History from the University of Hawaii in 1980, and a Master's in creative writing and English from SUNY Binghamton in 1985. Her husband, William Osborne, taught in Michigan.

== External sources ==
- Sylvia Watanabe, Michigan Writers Series, Audio interview March 16, 2001
