= Diana Chang =

Chinese American novelist and poet

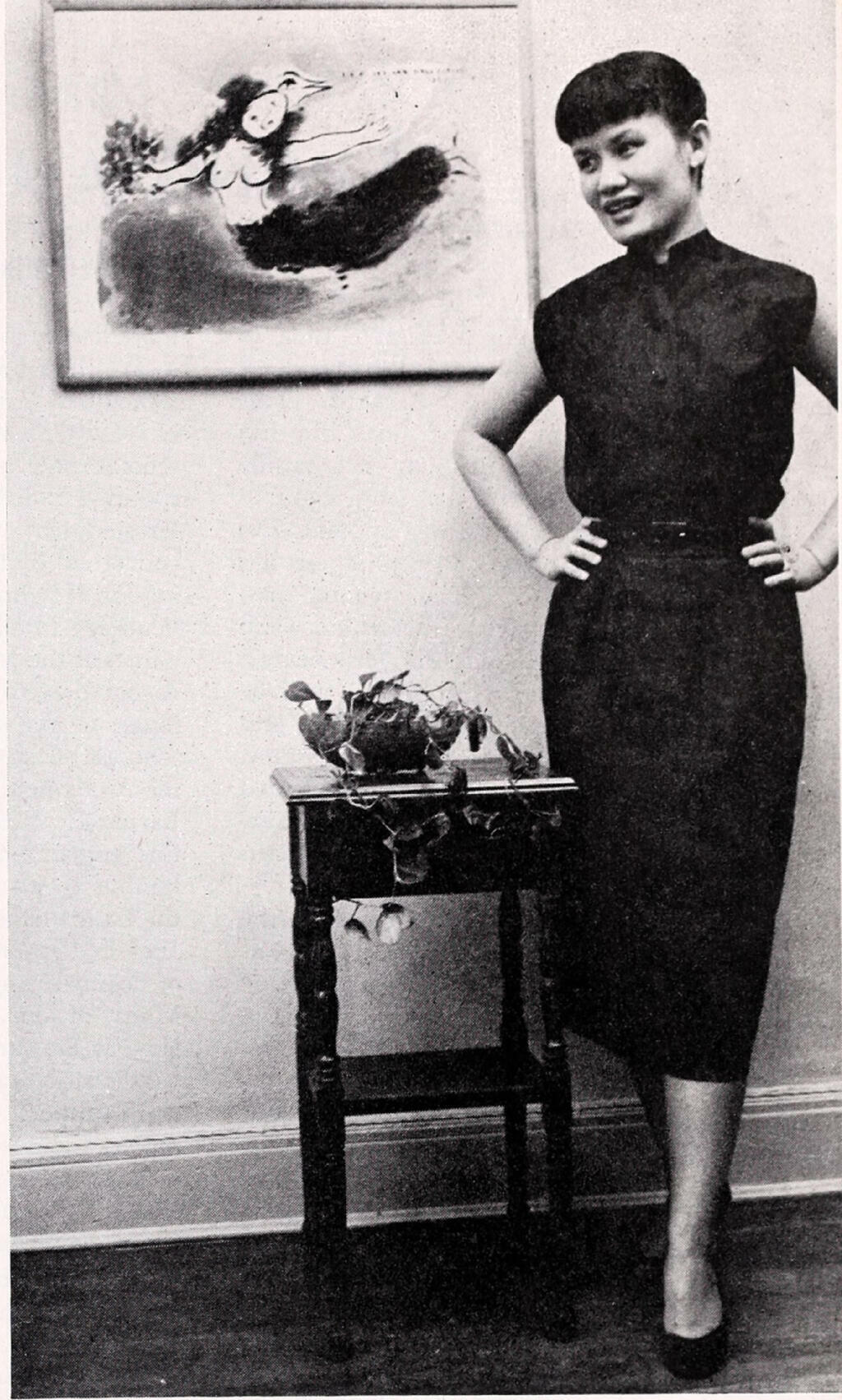
- Chang beside a Marc Chagall lithograph, c. 1951
- Born: 1924
- Died: February 19, 2009 (aged 84–85)
- Education: Barnard College
- Occupation: Novelist
- Writing career
- Genres: Novel, poetry
- Notable work: The Frontiers of Love

Diana Chang (Chinese: 張粲芳; 1924 – February 19, 2009) was a Chinese American novelist and poet. She is best known for her novel The Frontiers of Love, one of the earliest novels by an Asian American woman. She is considered to be the first American-born Chinese to publish a novel in the United States.

== Early life ==
Chang was born in New York City to a Chinese father, Kuang Chi Chang, and Eurasian mother, Eva Mary Lee Wah Chang, and spent her youngest years in China, including Beijing, Nanjing, and Shanghai. She attended high school in New York, and graduated cum laude from Barnard College in 1949 where she majored in English, focusing on British and American poets. While an undergraduate at Barnard, Chang had 3 of her poems published by Poetry Magazine, including "At The Window."

== Career ==
After graduation, Chang worked as a book editor at three publishing houses: Avon Books, Bobbs-Merrill, A. A. Wyn). She also worked as the editor for the PEN-sponsored journal American Pen and as a creative writing teacher at Barnard College.

== Literary work ==
Chang's best known work is The Frontiers of Love. Her work has more recently been read in terms of postmodernity and hybridity. Although critical work on Chang has increased since the republication of Frontiers, critics have preferred to examine her Asian-themed works; her "white" novels are only recently getting attention. While at Barnard College, Chang published her poem, Mood in Modern Poetry Association's Poetry.

== Personal life ==
Chang lived in Water Mill, NY with her husband David Hermann.

She died on February 19, 2009.

== Published works ==
=== Novels ===
- The Frontiers of Love, (1956, reissued 1974)
- A Woman of Thirty (1959)
- A Passion for Life (1961)
- The Only Game in Town (1963)
- Eye to Eye (1974)
- A Perfect Love (1978)

=== Poetry ===
- Saying Yes (Unknown)
- The Horizon is Definitely Speaking (1982)
- What Matisse is After (1984)
- Earth Water Light (1991)

== Awards ==
- Fulbright
- John Hay Whitney Opportunity Fellowship
- Mademoiselle Magazine Woman-of-the-Year

== See also ==
- List of Asian American writers
