= Jessica Hagedorn =

American playwright (born 1949)

Jessica Tarahata Hagedorn
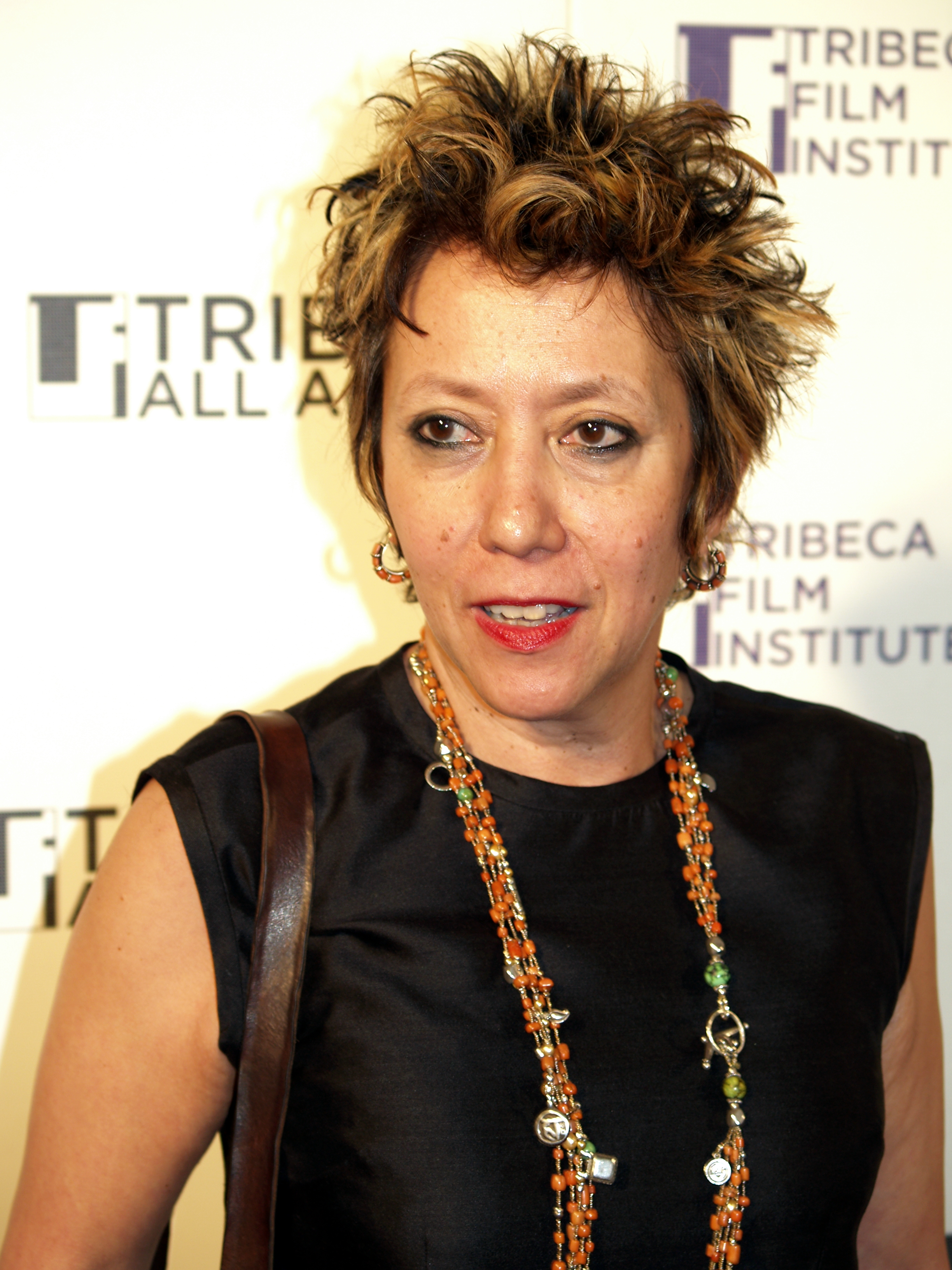
- Hagedorn at the Tribeca Film Festival in 2008
- Born: Jessica Tarahata Hagedorn; May 29, 1949 (age 77); Manila, Philippines
- Education: American Conservatory Theater
- Occupations: Playwright; writer; poet; multimedia performance artist

Jessica Tarahata Hagedorn (born May 29, 1949) is an American playwright, writer, poet, and multimedia performance artist.

== Biography ==
Hagedorn is an of mixed descent. She was born in Manila, Philippines, to a mother of Scots-Irish, French, and Filipino descent and a father of Filipino, Spanish, and Chinese heritage. Moving to San Francisco, California, in 1963, Hagedorn received her education at the American Conservatory Theater training program. To further pursue playwriting and music, she moved to New York City in 1978.

In 1978, Joseph Papp produced Hagedorn's first play, Mango Tango. Hagedorn's other productions include Tenement Lover, Holy Food, and Teenytown. Her mixed-media style often incorporates song, poetry, images, and spoken dialogue. From 1975 until 1985, she was the leader of a poet's band—The West Coast Gangster Choir (in San Francisco) and later The Gangster Choir (in New York).

In 1985, 1986, 1989, and 1994 she received MacDowell Colony fellowships, which helped enable her to write the novel Dogeaters, which illuminates many different aspects of Filipino experience, focusing on the influence of America through radio, television, and movie theaters. She shows the complexities of the love-hate relationship many Filipinos in diaspora feel toward their past. After its publication in 1990, her novel earned a 1990 National Book Award nomination and an American Book Award. In 1998 La Jolla Playhouse produced a stage adaptation. In 2001, the play adaptation premiered off-Broadway at The Public Theater.

Hagedorn worked with playwrights and artists Robbie McCauley and Laurie Carlos as the collective Thought Music, which later expanded to include visual artist John Woo as well. Together Thought Music created a number of works including Teenytown (presented at La Mama in 1987) and class (presented at The Kitchen in 2000). Thought Music together investigated race, class, sexism, and the role of immigrants in the United States. Hagedorn, with Thought Music and on her own, has also collaborated with Urban Bush Women on works including Heat and Lipstick.

Hagedorn lives in New York City with her daughters.

== Awards and fellowships ==
Hagedorn's novel Dogeaters earned a 1990 National Book Award nomination and an American Book Award.

Hagedorn, alongside bell hooks, June Jordan, and seven others, won the Lila Wallace-Reader's Digest Fund annual Writer's Awards in 1994 and they received $105,000 each.

In 2006, Hagedorn was one of the first eight playwrights to receive the Lucille Lortel Foundation fellowship.

In 2021, Hagedorn was the recipient of the Bret Adams and Paul Reisch Foundation's 2021 Idea Awards for Theatre, winning The Tooth of Time Distinguished Career Award and $20,000. Hagedorn, in collaboration with Two River Theater, is also working on a musical detailing the rise of Jean and June Millington of Fanny.

== Literary works ==
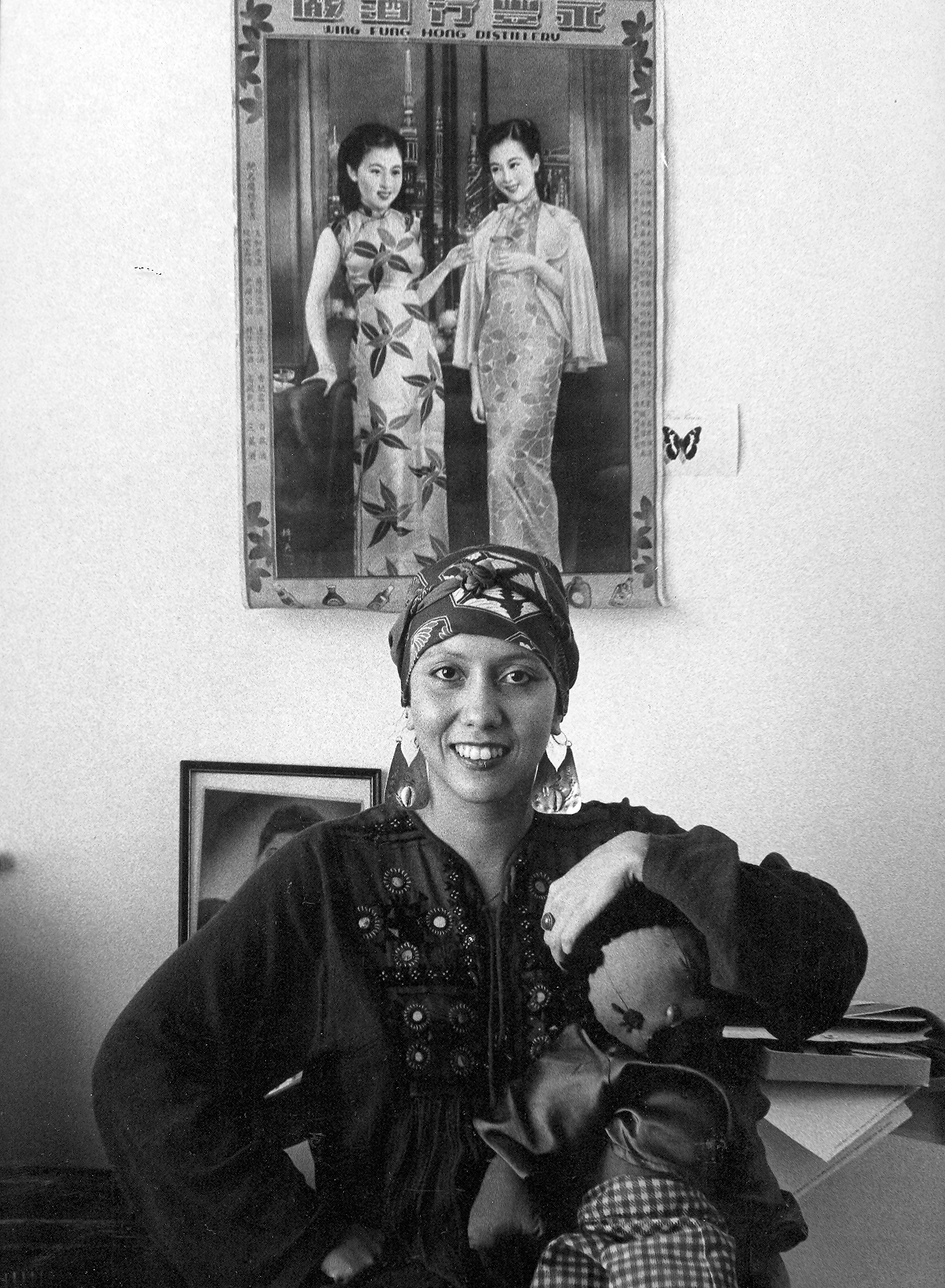
Hagedorn in San Francisco, California, 1975

- Chiquita Banana. Third World Women (3rd World Communications, 1972)
- Pet Food & Tropical Apparitions (Momo's Press, 1975)
- Dangerous Music (Momo's Press, 1975)
- Mango Tango (Y'Bird Magazine, January 1, 1977)
- Dogeaters (Penguin Books, 1990)
- Danger and Beauty (Penguin Books, 1993)
- Charlie Chan Is Dead: An Anthology of Contemporary Asian American Fiction (editor) (Penguin Books, 1993)
- The Gangster of Love (Houghton Mifflin, 1996)
- Burning Heart: A Portrait of the Philippines (with Marissa Roth) (Rizzoli, 1999)
- Dream Jungle (Viking Press/Penguin), 2003)
- Toxicology (Penguin Books, 2011)

=== Anthologies that include Hagedorn's work ===
- Four Young Women, ed. Kenneth Rexroth (New York: McGraw-Hill, 1973).
- Time To Greez! Incantations From the Third World, eds. Janice Mirikitani, et al. (San Francisco: Glide Pubs., 1975).
- American Born and Foreign: An Anthology of Asian American Poetry, eds Fay Chiang, et al. (New York: Sunbury Press Books, 1979).
- Breaking Silence: An Anthology of Contemporary Asian American Poets, ed. Joseph Bruchac (New York: Greenfield Review Press, 1983).
- The Open Boat: Poems From Asian America, ed. Garrett Hongo (New York: Doubleday, 1993).
- Stars Don't Stand Still in the Sky: Music and Myth, eds Karen Kelly and Evelyn McDonnell (New York: New York University Press, 1999).
- Stage Presence: Conversations with Filipino American Performing Artists, ed. Theodore S. Gonzalves (San Francisco and St. Helena: Meritage Press, 2007).
- The Soho Press Book of 80s Short Fiction, ed. Dale Peck (New York, NY: Soho Press, 2016).

== Sources ==
- Seiwoong Oh: Encyclopedia of Asian-American Literature. Series: Encyclopedia of American Ethnic Literature. Facts on File, 2007
