= Lawson Fusao Inada =

Japanese American poet (born 1938)

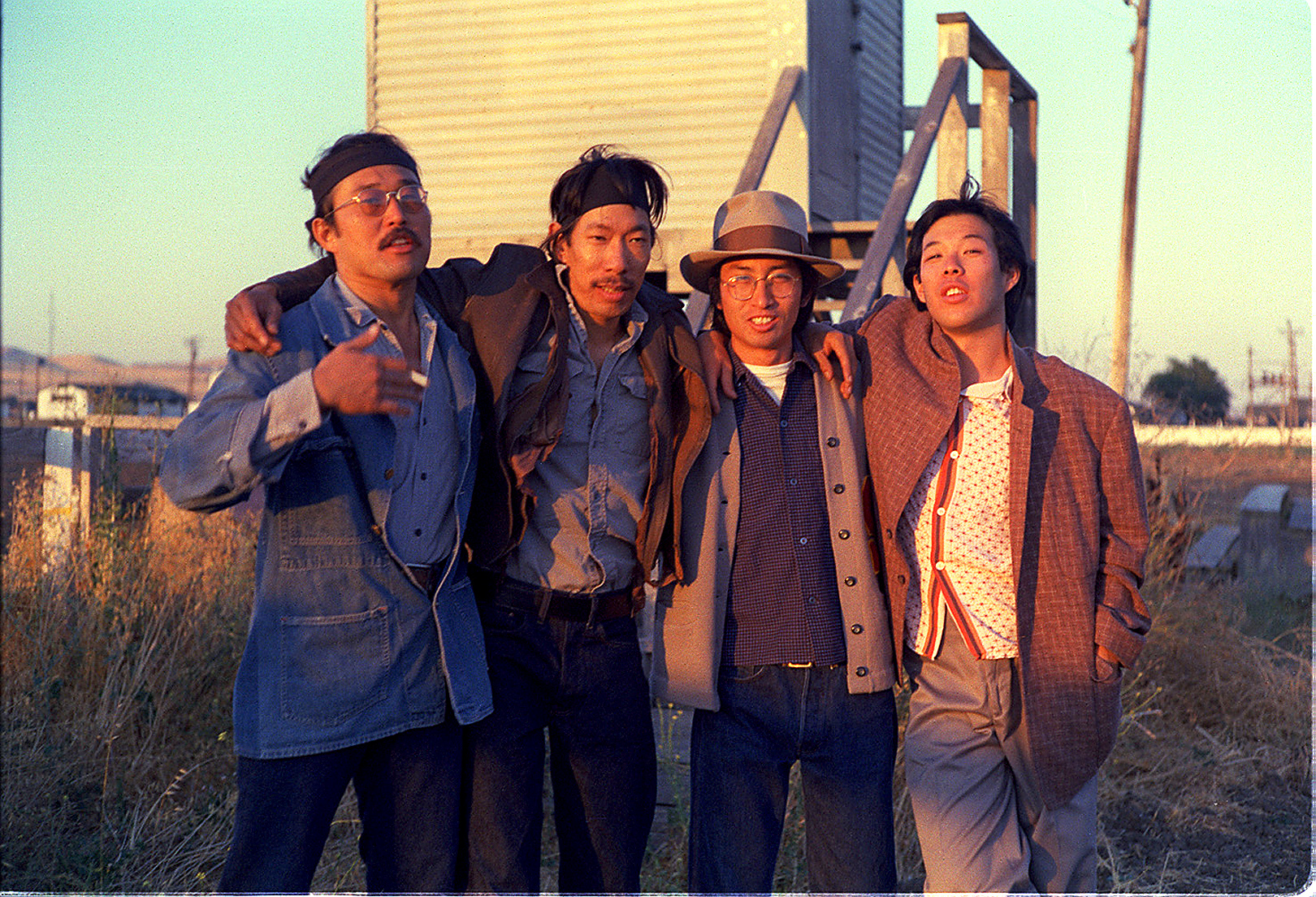
- Lawson Inada (left) with Frank Chin, Shawn Wong, and Michael Chan on the set of John Korty's 1976 film, Farewell to Manzanar
- Born: May 26, 1938 (age 88); Fresno, California, United States
- Occupation: poet

Lawson Fusao Inada (Japanese: 稲田 房生, born May 26, 1938) is a Japanese-American poet. He was the fifth poet laureate of the state of Oregon.

== Early life ==
Born May 26, 1938, Inada is a third-generation Japanese American (Sansei). His father, Fusaji, worked as a dentist, while his mother, Masako, helped run the family fish market in Fresno's Chinatown. In May 1942, at the age of three years, Inada and his family were interned for the duration of World War II at camps in Fresno, the Jerome War Relocation Center in Arkansas, and Granada War Relocation Center in Colorado. After the war, the Inadas returned to Fresno and once again ran the fish market, having trusted the business to family friends who operated it on their behalf during their confinement.

== Jazz influences ==
Following the war, Inada became a jazz musician, a bassist, following the work of Miles Davis, John Coltrane, and Billie Holiday, to whom he would later write tributes in his works. Inada cites jazz and his time in the internment camps as his chief influences as a poet. He studied writing at the Fresno State University, the University of Oregon, and the University of Iowa.

== Career highlights ==
Inada's first teaching job was at the University of New Hampshire, from 1962 to 1965. He moved to Oregon and earned an MFA from the University of Oregon in 1966, beginning teaching poetry at Southern Oregon University later that year.

In 1994, Inada's Legends from Camp won an American Book Award, and he has received several poetry fellowships from the National Endowment for the Arts. He also won the 1997 Stafford/Hall Award for Poetry.

In 2006 Inada was named Oregon's fifth poet laureate, the first person to fill the position since William Stafford in 1990. He was succeeded by Paulann Petersen in 2010.

== Select works ==
- Three Northwest Poets: Drake, Inada, Lawder, Madison: Quixote Press, 1970.
- Before the War; Poems as They Happened, New York: Morrow, 1971.
- Aiiieeeee! An Anthology of Asian-American Writers, Washington, DC: Howard University Press, 1974 (Coeditor).
- The Buddha Bandits Down Highway 99, Mountain View: Buddhahead Press, 1978 (With Garrett Kaoru Hongo and Alan Chong Lau).
- The Big Aiiieeeee!: An Anthology of Chinese American and Japanese American Literature, New York: Penguin, 1990 (Coeditor).
- Legends From Camp, Minneapolis: Coffee House Press, 1993. Winner, American Book Award. Finalist, Los Angeles Times Book Award for Poetry.
- In This Great Land of Freedom: The Japanese Pioneers of Oregon, Los Angeles: Japanese American National Museum, 1993 (Contributor).
- Touching the Stones: Tracing One Hundred Years of Japanese American History, Portland: Oregon Nikkei Endowment, 1994 (Contributor).
- Just Intonations, Ashland, Oregon: Graven Images Gallery Press, 1996.
- Drawing the Line, Minneapolis: Coffee House Press, 1997. Winner, Oregon Book Award for Poetry. A New York Public Library Book for the Teen Age.
- Only What We Could Carry: The Japanese American Internment Experience, Berkeley: Heyday Books, 2000 (Editor and author of introduction).
- Unfinished Message: Selected Works of Toshio Mori, Berkeley: Heyday Books, 2000 (Author of introduction).
- A Matter of Conscience: Essays on the World War II Heart Mountain Draft Resistance Movement. Powell, Wyoming: Western History Publications, 2002 (Contributor).

== See also ==
- List of Asian American writers
- Japanese American Internment
- Japanese American Historical Plaza, Portland
