= Grace Y. Kao =

Asian American professor of ethics

Grace Yia-Hei Kao (born 1974) is an ethicist who specializes in human rights and animal welfare, ecofeminism, reproductive ethics, and Asian American Christianity. Kao earned her Bachelor of Arts (philosophy & religious studies) and Masters of Arts degrees (philosophy) from Stanford University. She also earned her PhD in the Study of Religion at Harvard University. She is a Professor of Ethics at Claremont School of Theology and was the first Asian American woman to receive tenure there. She has been appointed the inaugural Bishop Roy I. Sano and Kathleen A. Thomas-Sano Endowed Chair in Pacific and Asian Theology. Kao was also the co-founding director of the Center for Sexuality, Gender, and Religion (CSGR).

Kao's most recent book is My Body, Their Baby: A Progressive Christian Vision for Surrogacy, which was published in 2023 by Stanford University Press; this book won a 2024 Choice Award for Outstanding Academic Title and the silver medal in theology for the 2024 Illumination Book Awards. Kao is also the author of Grounding Human Rights in a Pluralist World, published in 2011, and co-editor, with Ilsup Ahn, of Asian American Christian Ethics: Voices, Methods, Issues, published in 2015 and of Encountering the Sacred, Feminist Reflections on Women's Lives, published in 2018 with Rebecca Todd Peters. She received the faculty teaching award at Claremont School of Theology in 2011 and 2017.

== Work ==
- Kao, Grace Y. Grounding Human Rights in a Pluralist World. Georgetown University Press, 2011. ISBN 9781589017337
- Kao, Grace Y. and Ilsup Ahn, eds. Asian American Christian Ethics. Baylor University Press, 2015. ISBN 9781481301756
- Kao, Grace Y. and Rebecca Todd Peters, eds. Encountering the Sacred: Feminist Reflections on Women's Lives. T&T Clark, 2018. ISBN 9780567683007
- Kao, Grace. My Body, Their Baby: A Progressive Christian Vision for Surrogacy (Encountering Traditions). Stanford University Press, 2023. ISBN 9781503635975
