= The Higher Power of Lucky =

2006 book by Susan Patron

- First edition cover
- Author: Susan Patron
- Illustrator: Matt Phelan
- Cover artist: Matt Phelan
- Language: English
- Genre: Children's novel
- Publisher: Simon & Schuster
- Publication date: November 7, 2006
- Publication place: United States
- Media type: Print (hardcover)
- Pages: 134 pp
- ISBN: 1-4169-0194-9
- OCLC: 61253844
- LC Class: PZ7.P27565 Hig 2006

The Higher Power of Lucky is a children's novel written by Susan Patron and illustrated by Matt Phelan. Published in 2006 by Simon & Schuster, it was awarded the 2007 Newbery Medal.

== Plot summary ==
Lucky Trimble is a ten-year-old girl who lives in Hard Pan, a small town (population 43) in the California desert. She has two friends: Lincoln, an avid knot tyer and expected by his mother to be the President when he grows up; and Miles, a five-year-old whose favorite book is Are You My Mother? by P. D. Eastman. After Lucky's mother died two years earlier, her father called upon his first ex-wife, Brigitte, to come to the United States from France to take care of Lucky.

Lucky fears that Brigitte is tired of being her guardian and of their life in Hard Pan. When Lucky discovers Brigitte's suitcase and passport lying out, she becomes convinced that Brigitte will abandon her and return to France. This anxiety prompts Lucky to seek help from her Higher Power, a notion she acquires from eavesdropping at her town's 12-step meetings. After discovering three "signs" to leave, she runs away with her dog, HMS Beagle, (Note: Named for the ship HMS Beagle of Charles Darwin's adventures and studies.) during a sandstorm. Outside of town, however, she finds Miles, lost and injured in the storm, and takes him with her. They shelter in the dugouts near an abandoned mine and wait out the storm. They are soon joined by Lincoln, who tells them that the rest of the town is looking for them and will be there shortly. Before she leaves the dugouts, she casts her mother's ashes out in the wind in a makeshift memorial service with the townsfolk. Brigitte takes Lucky home and explains the papers Lucky had found in Brigitte's suitcase were actually to legally adopt Lucky, and she reveals her plans to open a restaurant in Hard Pan.

== Controversy ==
Controversy has arisen over the book due to the use of the word scrotum on its seventh page. A number of school libraries decided to ban or otherwise censor the book, according to The New York Times article. While some accuse the author of attempting "Howard Stern-type shock treatment", author Susan Patron described the passage in question as being based on her personal knowledge of a rattlesnake biting a dog's scrotum, as well as an explanation of anatomy for readers 9 to 12 years old. She appeared on NPR's Talk of the Nation to defend her choice of words.

The American Library Association responded to the New York Times article with a statement regarding the value of the book. Cynthia Lord, Jennifer Holm, and Kirby Larson are authors of the three Newbery Honor books who also supported the "scrotum" usage. The story gained further exposure on the blogosphere. Kristen McLean, executive director of the Association of Booksellers for Children, provided the industry's response.

Simon & Schuster posted a video on their website in which Patron discusses the book and her influences in an interview by fellow Newbery Medalist Cynthia Kadohata. In the video, Rick Richter, President of the Simon & Schuster Children's Publishing Division, stated: "Simon & Schuster ultimately hopes that readers will recognize this wonderful book as a whole, and the charm and innocence of its main character Lucky, and will see beyond one word and the controversy surrounding the book. Susan Patron has written a masterful novel celebrating small town values and we can only hope that her deserved Newbery winner is recognized for the treasure that it truly is".

== Sequels to The Higher Power of Lucky ==
The sequel to The Higher Power of Lucky was published on March 10, 2009 by Simon & Schuster. Lucky Breaks includes Lucky's eleventh birthday, and the introduction of another friend in her world.

The third and final book in Lucky's Hard Pan trilogy is Lucky For Good, which was released in August 2011.

== Notes ==
Awards
Preceded by Criss Cross	Newbery Medal recipient 2007	Succeeded by Good Masters! Sweet Ladies! Voices from a Medieval Village
