= Weedflower =

2006 children's novel by Cynthia Kadohata

- Author: Cynthia Kadohata
- Cover artist: Lisa Vega
- Language: English
- Genre: Children's fiction
- Set in: United States, 1941
- Published: 1 April 2006
- Publisher: Aladdin Paperbacks
- Publication place: United States
- Media type: Print
- Pages: 260
- ISBN: 978-1-4169-7566-3

Weedflower is a 2006 American children's historical novel by Cynthia Kadohata, the author of the award-winning Kira-Kira. The cover photography of the first edition is by Kamil Vojnar. The story is set in the United States during World War II and told from the perspective of 12-year-old Japanese-American Sumiko. A 6.5-hour-long audiobook version of Weedflower, read by Kimberly Farr, has been published.

== Plot ==
The story takes place in 1941. A classmate invites the main character Sumiko to a birthday party. Sumiko goes with a gift her uncle bought, but she is not invited into the house because she is Japanese. When she returns home, she lies to her family so as not to disappoint them. Afterward, she tells the truth to her cousin Bull and her little brother Tak-Tak.

To Sumiko's surprise, Japan bombs Hawaii's Pearl Harbor. The United States declares war on Japan. Sumiko and her family are forced to burn everything that may seem "disloyal" or suspicious, including Sumiko's dead parents' photo. Sumiko is kept home from school. Her grandfather is arrested for being first-generation Japanese (issei) and former principal of a Japanese school, and her uncle is arrested for being former president of a Japanese flower-growing association.

By the end of February, more than 2,000 people of Japanese ancestry, including American citizens, have been wrongfully arrested and relocated to prison camps. Gradually, all Japanese people, including Sumiko's family, have to leave their homes and belongings and go to camps. Sumiko has to leave her flower farm and move twice, from the San Carlos racetrack camp to Poston War Relocation Center in Poston, Arizona.

When Sumiko arrives at her "permanent" camp in Poston, she meets many people, including Sachi, Mr. Moto, and a Native American boy called Frank, who eventually becomes her first real friend. Sumiko gardens as a pastime to relive her memories from her flower farm back in her California home.

Several months later, the United States announces that the Japanese prisoners can go outside the camps to be employed. After initial reluctance, Sumiko leaves with her aunt to a sewing factory in Illinois. Her cousins, Bull and Ichiro, leave to fight for the army. After saying an abrupt, quick goodbye to Frank, she leaves the camp, and seeks out her future in Illinois.

== Awards, achievements, and recognitions ==
- ALA Best Books for Young Adults Nominee
- ALA Notable Children's Book Nominee
- Agatha Award Finalist
- Booklist Editors' Choice
- CBC/NCSS Notable Social Studies Trade Book
- CCBC Choices (Cooperative Children's Book Council)
- Charlie May Simon Book Award ML (AR)
- Chicago Public Library's Best of the Best
- Dorothy Canfield Fisher Book Award Master List (VT)
- IRA/CBC Children's Choices
- Indian Paintbrush Book Award Master List (WY)
- Jane Addams Children's Book Award
- Kentucky Bluegrass Award Master List
- Keystone to Reading Book Award Master List (PA)
- Massachusetts Children's Book Award Master List
- Nene Award Master List (HI)
- Oppenheim Toy Portfolio Platinum Award
- PEN USA Literary Award for Children's Literature
- Texas Bluebonnet Master List
- Young Hoosier Book Award Master List (IN)

== Reception ==
Critical reception has been mostly positive. Weedflower has received reviews from BookPage, Kirkus Reviews, and Publishers Weekly, and starred reviews from Booklist and School Library Journal. BookPage had stated that the novel provides a "well-rounded look at a painful moment in this country's history." Booklist praised that the novel had "beautifully individualized characters". The School Library Journal said "the concise yet lyrical prose conveys [Sumiko's] story in a compelling narrative that will resonate with a wide audience". Publishers Weekly stated that "Kadohata clearly and eloquently conveys her heroine's mixture of shame, anger and courage". Kirkus says that the story is "quietly powerful". On the other hand, VOYA Magazine criticized that the book has "inconsistent and flat characterization and a narrative tendency to tell rather than to show, as well as an overabundance of exclamation points".

== See also ==
- Kira-Kira
