= T. K. Shindo =

Japanese photographer

- Born: Koryu Shindo (震度子流); 24 November 1890; Kobuchisawa, Kitakoma District, Hokuto, Yamanashi, Yamanashi Prefecture, Empire of Japan
- Died: 1974 (aged 83–84); Los Angeles, Los Angeles, California, U.S.
- Other name: Thomas Koryu Shindo (震度子流)
- Years active: 1928-1942
- Organization(s): Rafu Shimpo; Japanese Camera Pictorialists of California
- Known for: Photography

T. K. Shindo (Koryu Shindo, 24 November 1890 – 1974) was a Japanese photographer.

== Early life ==
Shindo was born Koryu Shindo (震度子流) in Kobuchisawa, Japan on 24 November 1890. He was the only son of a teacher and town mayor, who encouraged him to immigrate to the United States to avoid conscription into the Japanese military service. He entered the United States through Seattle in 1907, eventually settling in Los Angeles where he assumed the name Thomas.

== Career ==
In his early career, Shindo supported himself as a presser and cutter in a tailor shop. He also worked in the grocery business until he was able to establish himself creatively. By 1918, he became the advertising director for the Rafu Shimpo, a Japanese-language newspaper that grew out of the Little Tokyo area of Los Angeles, California. He designed the newspaper's masthead and began to create other opportunities for Japanese-American artists in the area. Under his direction, the newspaper sponsored photography competitions and exhibitions that nourished the development of a strong photographic community in Little Tokyo.

Shindo joined the Japanese Camera Pictorialists of California (JCPC) in 1928 and likely created the club's logo. In the early days, his home bathroom doubled as his darkroom where he would develop film and prints. He was a prolific artist and his photographs were published in eight issues of the annual Photograms of the Year, more than any other Japanese-American. Shindo rose in prominence over the years, submitting work to photographic salons in Chicago, Los Angeles, New York, Ottawa, Paris, Pittsburgh, Rochester, San Diego, San Francisco, Tokyo, Toronto, Turin, and Zaragoza. His work appeared in print both domestically and internationally.

== WWII and incarceration ==
Escalating WWII tensions brought an end to the growth of organizations like the Rafu Shimpo and the JCPC. This was explicit with the Enemy Alien Control Program and presidential proclamations such as the below, which outlawed the possession of cameras, among other technologies.

Regulations Controlling Travel and Other Conduct of Aliens of Enemy Nationalities Sec. 10. Cameras. (a) No alien of enemy nationality shall use or operate or possess or have under his custody or control at any time or place any camera.

Shindo was aware that his prominent roles within the Rafu Shimpo and JCPC could make him a target of the Federal Bureau of Investigation, which was actively surveilling and arresting fellow Issei community members. He conveyed these fears to his family, prompting his wife (Mino Okubo) to keep "a satchel of his clothes waiting by the front door in anticipation of his imminent arrest".

In 1942, Shindo and his family were incarcerated in the Poston War Relocation Center in Arizona following the signing of Executive Order 9066. He remained a leader within the community and served as the Vice Chairman of the Poston chapter of the Red Cross, which advocated for community well-being and access to resources including CPR training and emergency telephone lines. His responsibilities also included Publicity Manager, Editor of the Poston Red Cross News, and technical art works production. In these roles, he led efforts including the annual War Fund Drive, accident prevention week, and joint picnics with the Poston I High School's Junior Red Cross Council. The Poston Red Cross organization also began selling geta and zori in 1942, a detail captured by the Poston Chronicle.
