= Ben Sakoguchi =

Japanese-American painter

Aphrodisiac Brand by Sakoguchi, Honolulu Museum of Art

Ben Sakoguchi (born 1938) is a Japanese-American artist who was born in San Bernardino, California. At age five, his family was interned at the Poston War Relocation Center in Arizona following the enforcement of Executive Order 9066.

== Education ==
In 1960, Sakoguchi earned a Bachelor of Fine Arts from the University of California, Los Angeles. In 1964, Sakoguchi earned a Master of Fine Arts degree from University of California, Los Angeles.

== Career ==
Sakoguchi was an art instructor at Pasadena City College from 1964 until his retirement in 1997.

Sakoguchi is best known for his small paintings that were created in series, often with socially relevant themes, such as slavery and the internment of Japanese Americans. Sakoguchi is known for his Orange Crate Label series. Aphrodisiac Brand, in the collection of the Honolulu Museum of Art, is a mock orange-crate label. It shows a rhinoceros slaughtered for its horn, which is erroneously believed to be an aphrodisiac or a cure for cancer in Traditional Chinese medicine as Cornu Rhinoceri Asiatici (犀角, xījiǎo, "rhinoceros horn").

=== Collections (selection) ===
Ben Sakoguchi's work is featured in the museum collections of the Museum of Modern Art, New York, the Pérez Art Museum Miami, Florida, and the Smithsonian Institutions, Washington DC, among others.
