= Pearl Mitsu Sonoda =

American ichthyologist and biologist (1918–2015)

Pearl Mitsu Sonoda (May 17, 1918 – March 4, 2015), was an American ichthyologist and biologist who was interned with her family in an American War Relocation Center during World War II because they had Japanese heritage. After her release, she joined the staff of the Field Museum.

== Early life and family ==
The third of four daughters, Pearl Mitsu Sonoda was born May 17, 1918, in Imperial, California, to Tomoji and Sachi Sonoda. Her father, Tomoji, was a Japanese-born immigrant to the United States who owned and operated an asparagus ranch.

=== Internment ===
When the United States entered World War II, in late March 1942, Sonoda was mid-semester at Pomona College but was told she had to withdraw from college due to government relocation orders for Japanese Americans. Her father, Tomoji, had been arrested by the Federal Bureau of Investigation in early 1942, leaving her mother and three sisters to sell off the family's ranch, home, and possessions before they were moved to an American internment camp. Sonoda and her family (besides her father) were interned at the Poston War Relocation Center located near Parker, Arizona. After a year of internment, Pearl's father, Tomoji, was able to join them at the Poston Camp. In 1943, herpetologist Karl P. Schmidt, allied with the Quaker's American Service Committee, sponsored the release of Sonoda so she could join him in his work at the Field Museum of Natural History in Chicago.

== Education & career ==
Sonoda pursued a degree in biology from the University of California, Berkeley during 1936–1937 and also took classes at Pomona College in California and Roosevelt University in Chicago. After her release from the internment camp in 1943, she worked for the Field Museum as the secretary and assistant in the division of mammals until 1955, when she began her role as an assistant in the division of fishes, a position she would keep until 1967. After she left the Field Museum, she worked as a senior curatorial assistant in the ichthyology department of the California Academy of Sciences. Sonoda retired from this position in 1995.

During her career, Sonoda published three works. In 1964, she completed her first paper with herpetologist Robert F. Inger, an obituary for Marion Grey. Her second work, "Order Berycomorphi (Beryciformes)", was published in 1973 in collaboration with Loren P. Woods within the book Fishes of the Western North Atlantic. Her last paper, "Anchoa mundeola (Gilbert & Pierson): A Valid Species of Engraulidae from the Gulf of Panama", was co-authored by Gareth Nelson and was published in 1987.

== Later life and death ==
Sonoda retired from the California Academy of Sciences in 1995 after almost 30 years of work. After her retirement she moved to Chicago, Illinois, to be closer to two of her sisters, Mary and Louise. In 2010, when Sonoda's health began to decline, she moved to Arvada, Colorado, to be closer to her third sister, Margaret. On March 4, 2015, Pearl Mitsu Sonoda died in Colorado at the age of 96.
