= Criss Cross (novel) =

2005 novel by Lynne Rae Perkins

- First edition cover - early printing
- Author: Lynne Rae Perkins
- Language: English
- Genre: Young adult novel
- Publisher: Greenwillow Books
- Publication date: September 2005
- Publication place: United States
- Media type: Print (hardback & paperback)
- Pages: 368 pp (first edition, hardback)
- ISBN: 0-06-009272-6 (first edition, hardback)
- OCLC: 56324543
- LC Class: PZ7.P4313 Cr 2005

Criss Cross is a novel by Lynne Rae Perkins that received the 2006 Newbery Medal for excellence in children's literature. It includes the character Debbie from her previous novel, All Alone in the Universe, but introduces several new characters, primarily her neighborhood friends Hector, Lenny, Patty, and Phil.

== Plot ==
This story takes place in a small midwestern town called Seldom, during spring and summer in the early 1970s. It follows the criss-crossing stories of a group of middle-school children. A necklace plays a significant part in all of the criss-cross moments, helping the characters in the book to find their true selves, giving the novel a touch of magic realism.

Debbie spends her summer with four friends: Patty, Hector, Lenny, and Phil. The group passes their days around town, often sitting in Lenny's father's pickup truck listening to the radio. Each character grapples with a desire for change and a search for identity over the course of the summer. Debbie, the central protagonist, longs for something different and frequently reflects on the idea of finding true love. Hector, another central figure, discovers a passion for guitar and develops a romantic interest in Meadow, a girl he meets through his guitar lessons. Patty's inner thoughts are explored alongside Debbie's, while Lenny is portrayed as intellectually curious, having educated himself through encyclopedias, though he struggles with formal testing. Over the summer, each character undergoes personal growth and change. The novel concludes with a block party that marks the end of summer and signals the characters' transition into greater maturity.

== Theme ==
The overall theme of Criss Cross is adolescence and identity, and making connections. The teenagers start to grow and mature, while trying to find their true selves and identity. Their stories connect in the book, and sometimes their paths can criss cross and connect, but they miss each other by less than a second.

== Reception ==
Kirkus Reviews described Criss Cross as "A tenderly existential work that will reward more thoughtful readers in this age of the ubiquitous action saga." According to The Horn Book Magazine, "In idiosyncratic, wistful prose, Perkins mines every moment of missed connection and near-change with a hypnotic hyperawareness reminiscent of adolescence itself." In 2008, Anita Silvey, author of 100 Best Books for Children, described Criss Cross in a School Library Journal article as one of several recent Newbery winners considered "particularly disappointing" by public librarians.

Awards
Preceded by Kira-Kira	Newbery Medal recipient 2006	Succeeded by The Higher Power of Lucky
