= Susan Patron =

American children's book author

- Born: 1948; Los Angeles, California, U.S.
- Died: October 24, 2023 (aged 74–75)
- Occupations: Writer, librarian
- Spouse: Rene Patron
- Writing career
- Genres: Fiction, children's literature
- Notable work: The Higher Power of Lucky
- Notable awards: Newbery Medal; 2007

Susan Patron (1948 – October 24, 2023) was an American author of children's books. In 2007, she won the Newbery Award for The Higher Power of Lucky. Her first children's book, Burgoo Stew, was published in 1990. It was followed by three more picture books and the book Maybe Yes, Maybe No, Maybe Maybe, which won the 1993 Parent's Choice Award. Patron published a sequel to The Higher Power of Lucky called Lucky Breaks (Simon & Schuster, March, 2009), and then followed it up with the third and final book in Lucky's Hard Pan Trilogy, Lucky For Good (Simon & Schuster, August, 2011).

Patron was the Juvenile Materials Collection Development Manager at the Los Angeles Public Library until her retirement in March 2007. She was a Senior Librarian at the Los Angeles Public Library, where she began in 1972.

She reviewed children's literature, taught and lectured on the subject, and served on boards and committees in the field including the Society of Children's Book Writers and Illustrators.

Patron was married for 54 years to Rene Albert Patron, an accomplished bookbinder. She died on October 24, 2023.
