= All Alone in the Universe =

Book by Lynne Rae Perkins

- Author: Lynne Rae Perkins
- Language: English
- Publication date: 1999

All Alone in the Universe is a children's novel by American author Lynne Rae Perkins. It was first published in 1999. It is about a young middle school girl named Debbie and the hardships she faces as her best friend, Maureen, is "stolen" from her by a classmate, Glenna.

All Alone in the Universe was Lynne Rae Perkins' first published novel. Her other works include the picture books The Broken Cat and Snow Music and the Newbery Medal-winning novel, Criss Cross.

== Plot ==
Debbie and Maureen are best friends, until Glenna Flaiber begins to join in on their friendship activities, and soon Debbie realizes that Maureen is ignoring her. Debbie decides that a third person in their relationship won't work, and does everything in her power to fix her relationship with Maureen. In the end, Maureen and Glenna are inseparable, leaving Debbie "all alone in the universe".
