= Ronald Phillip Tanaka =

American poet (1944–2007)

Ronald Phillip Tanaka (1944–2007) was a Japanese-American poet and editor.

== Life ==
He was a Sansei (a third-generation Japanese-American), born in the Poston War Relocation Center in Arizona in 1944 behind barbed wire.

He attended Pomona College, Claremont and the University of California, Berkeley where he took an interdisciplinary Ph.D. Renaissance British Literature, philosophy of language and generative syntax and semantics under the tutelage of Julian C. Boyd. Ronald Tanaka taught English at the California State University Sacramento.

He was the single parent of two girls, Shinobu and Yoi.

== Awards ==
- 1982 American Book Award for The Shino Suite: Japanese-American Poetry
- California Arts Council
- Sacramento Metropolitan Arts Commission
- Foundation of California State University, Sacramento

== Works ==
- The Shino Suite: Japanese-American Poetry. Authors Choice Press. December 15, 2000. ISBN 978-0-595-15376-3.
- Shidó, The Way of Poetry. Authors Choice Press. April 6, 2001. ISBN 978-0-595-18243-5.
- Scenes from a Country Tea Room: New Japanese-American Poetry. iUniverse. 2006. ISBN 978-0-595-41720-9.
- Systems Models for Literary Macro-theory (1976)
- "On the Metaphysical Foundations of a Sansei Poetics", Journal of Ethnic Studies

=== Anthologies ===
- Joseph Bruchac, ed. (1983). Breaking silence: an anthology of contemporary Asian American poets. Greenfield Review Press. ISBN 978-0-912678-59-7.
- Walter K. Lew, ed. (1995). Premonitions: the Kaya anthology of new Asian North American poetry. Kaya Productions.
