= Tak Fujimoto =

American cinematographer

Tak Fujimoto ASC
- Born: Takashi Fujimoto; July 12, 1939 (age 87); San Diego, California, U.S.
- Education: San Dieguito High School; University of California, Berkeley; London Film School
- Years active: 1970–2015
- Relatives: Jack Fujimoto (brother)

Takashi Fujimoto ASC (born July 12, 1939) is a retired American cinematographer, known for his frequent collaborations with directors Jonathan Demme and M. Night Shyamalan.

In 2016, IndieWire named him one of the 11 best cinematographers to have never won an Academy Award.

== Early life and education ==
Takashi Fujimoto (Japanese: 藤本 隆) was born in San Diego, California to Japanese American parents. His father, Morizo, was an Issei (first-generation) from Hiroshima, and his mother, Emi, was a Nisei (second-generation) born in Glendale, California. His older brother was academic Jack Fujimoto. During World War II, Fujimoto and his family were interned at the Poston War Relocation Center due to Executive Order 9066.

Fujimoto graduated from San Dieguito High School in 1957. He studied at the University of California, Berkeley and the London Film School. He began his career as an assistant to Haskell Wexler at his production company Dove Films.

== Career ==
Fujimoto's first film as cinematographer was Chicago Blues, a 1970 music documentary featuring the likes of Dick Gregory, Buddy Guy and Muddy Waters. He was one of three directors of photography that worked on Terrence Malick's 1973 directorial debut Badlands, earning rave reviews. He shot a string of low-budget exploitation films for producer Roger Corman, including Death Race 2000 and Switchblade Sisters (as second unit photographer). He was also one of several second unit cinematographers who worked on the first Star Wars film.

During this period, he also began his long-running collaboration with director Jonathan Demme. Their first film together was Caged Heat in 1974. He would shoot a total of 11 films with Demme, as well as the 2013 pilot episode of the television drama A Gifted Man. He also had fruitful collaborations with John Hughes, shooting Pretty in Pink and Ferris Bueller's Day Off, and with M. Night Shyamalan, shooting The Sixth Sense, Signs, and The Happening.

Fujimoto has been a member of the American Society of Cinematographers since 1997.

== Personal life ==
Fujimoto had retired by 2015, and lived with his wife Anthea in Santa Fe, New Mexico.

== Filmography ==
=== Film ===
Year	Title	Director	Notes
1970	Chicago Blues	Harley Cokeliss	Documentary film
1973	Badlands	Terrence Malick	With Stevan Larner and Brian Probyn
1974	Caged Heat	Jonathan Demme	
1974	Bootleggers	Charles B. Pierce	
1975	Death Race 2000	Paul Bartel	
1976	Dr. Black, Mr. Hyde	William Crain	
1976	Cannonball	Paul Bartel	
1977	Chatterbox	Tom DeSimone	
1977	Bad Georgia Road	John Broderick	
1978	Remember My Name	Alan Rudolph	
1978	Stony Island	Andrew Davis	
1979	Shadow of Fear	Noel Nosseck	
1979	Last Embrace	Jonathan Demme	
1980	Where the Buffalo Roam	Art Linson	
1980	Borderline	Jerrold Freedman	
1980	Melvin and Howard	Jonathan Demme	
1983	Heart Like a Wheel	Jonathan Kaplan	
1984	Swing Shift	Jonathan Demme	
1986	Pretty in Pink	Howard Deutch	
1986	Ferris Bueller's Day Off	John Hughes	
1986	Something Wild	Jonathan Demme	
1987	Backfire	Gilbert Cates	
1988	Married to the Mob	Jonathan Demme	
1988	Sweet Hearts Dance	Robert Greenwald	
1988	Cocoon: The Return	Daniel Petrie	
1990	Miami Blues	George Armitage	
1991	The Silence of the Lambs	Jonathan Demme	
1991	Crooked Hearts	Michael Bortman	
1992	Gladiator	Rowdy Herrington	
1992	Singles	Cameron Crowe	With Ueli Steiger
1992	Night and the City	Irwin Winkler	
1993	Philadelphia	Jonathan Demme	
1995	Devil in a Blue Dress	Carl Franklin	
1995	Grumpier Old Men	Howard Deutch	
1996	That Thing You Do!	Tom Hanks	
1997	A Thousand Acres	Jocelyn Moorhouse	
1998	Beloved	Jonathan Demme	
1999	The Sixth Sense	M. Night Shyamalan	
2000	The Replacements	Howard Deutch	
2002	Signs	M. Night Shyamalan	
2002	The Truth About Charlie	Jonathan Demme	
2004	The Final Cut	Omar Naim	
2004	The Manchurian Candidate	Jonathan Demme	
2007	Breach	Billy Ray	
2008	The Great Buck Howard	Sean McGinly	
2008	The Happening	M. Night Shyamalan	
2010	Devil	John Erick Dowdle	
2013	Gods Behaving Badly	Marc Turtletaub	

Short film

Year	Title	Director	Notes
1982	Growing Yourself	Bob Giraldi	Segments of National Lampoon's Movie Madness
1982	Success Wanters	Bob Giraldi	Segments of National Lampoon's Movie Madness
1994	The Complex Sessions	Jonathan Demme	

=== Television ===
TV movies

Year	Title	Director
1976	Almos' a Man	Stan Lathan
1978	Lawman Without a Gun	Jerrold Freedman
1979	Some Kind of Miracle	Jerrold Freedman
1982	Divorce Wars: A Love Story	Donald Wrye
1984	The Seduction of Gina	Jerrold Freedman
1985	Seduced	Jerrold Freedman
1985	Blackout	Douglas Hickox
1989	Cast the First Stone	John Korty

TV series

Year	Title	Director	Notes
1978	At Home with Shields and Yarnell	Andrew Davis	TV short
1985	MacGyver	Jerrold Freedman (Note: Credited as Alan Smithee)	Episode "Pilot"
2008	John Adams	Tom Hooper	4 episodes
2011	A Gifted Man	Jonathan Demme	Episode "Pilot"

== Awards and nominations ==
Year	Award	Category	Title	Result
1999	American Society of Cinematographers	Outstanding Achievement in Cinematography	The Sixth Sense	Nominated
1992	British Academy Film Awards	Best Cinematography	The Silence of the Lambs	Nominated
1991	Boston Society of Film Critics	Best Cinematography	The Silence of the Lambs	Won
1999	Chicago Film Critics Association	Best Cinematography	Beloved	Nominated
1995	National Society of Film Critics	Best Cinematography	Devil in a Blue Dress	Won
2008	Primetime Emmy Awards	Outstanding Cinematography for a Limited Series	John Adams	Won (Note: For episode "Independence")
2009	Primetime Emmy Awards	Outstanding Cinematography for a Limited Series	John Adams	Nominated (Note: For episode "Don't Treat Me")
1999	Satellite Awards	Best Cinematography	Beloved	Nominated
