= Yosh Kawano =

American baseball clubhouse manager (1921–2018)

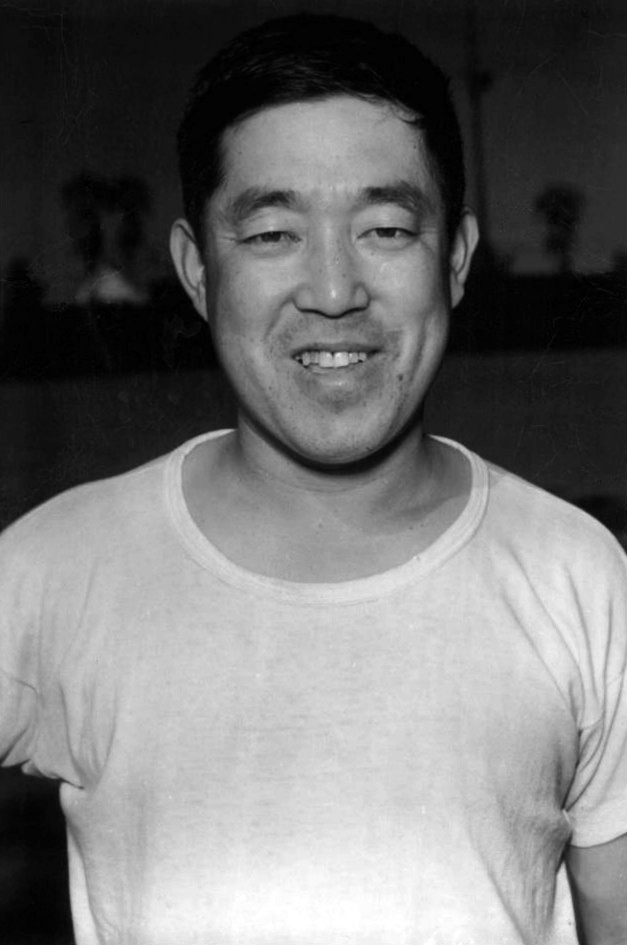
- Yosh Kawano c. 1953
- Born: June 4, 1921; Seattle, Washington, U.S.
- Died: June 25, 2018 (aged 97); Los Angeles, California, U.S.
- Occupation: Clubhouse manager for the Chicago Cubs
- Years active: 1942–2008
- Relatives: Nobe Kawano (brother)

Yosh Kawano (June 4, 1921 – June 25, 2018) was an American clubhouse manager for the Chicago Cubs baseball team who retired in 2008 and was known for his trademark white fishing hat. Kawano's long service and dedication to the team made him a part of Chicago Cubs team lore. A member of the Chicago Cubs Hall of Fame, he is honored by a plaque in the concourse of Wrigley Field.

== Early career ==
Born in Seattle, Washington, Kawano began working for the Cubs in 1935 as a spring training batboy. He began working at Wrigley Field as a visiting clubhouse attendant in 1943.

According to the June 3rd, 1943, issue of The Sporting News, Kawano's first baseball job was as batboy for the Chicago White Sox during their California spring training that season. This assignment brought him reprieve from an internment camp for Japanese-Americans. Kawano had been interned at the Poston War Relocation Center in Arizona following the signing of Executive Order 9066.

== Later career ==
Kawano spent 65 years as a Cubs employee. He was stationed in the team's home clubhouse at Wrigley Field for many years until he was assigned again to the visitors' clubhouse in 1999.

== The Kawano clause and legacy ==
Reportedly, the contract for the sale of the Cubs from the Wrigley family to the Chicago Tribune in 1981 included a clause to guarantee Kawano a job for life with the Cubs. Former Cubs player and enshrined member of the Baseball Hall of Fame Ryne Sandberg has suggested that if the Cubs were ever to change the name of Wrigley Field, that the ballpark should be named Yosh Kawano Field. Sandberg also thanked Kawano in his Hall of Fame induction speech.

On June 16, 2008, Kawano donated his trademark fishing hat to the Baseball Hall of Fame in Cooperstown, New York.

On Thursday, June 26, 2008, it was announced that Yosh Kawano would be retiring at the conclusion of the 2008 season. Kawano joined Cubs' Hall of Famer Billy Williams as guest conductor for "Take Me Out To the Ballgame" during the 7th inning stretch of the Cubs-Orioles game on June 26, 2008, a game which the Cubs lost 11–4 to the Baltimore Orioles.

On July 14, 2009, the Chicago Sun-Times reported that two weeks earlier security guards had ejected Kawano from Wrigley Field. The action was allegedly taken to protect Kawano, who was visiting friends there when he was escorted from the park. According to the Sun-Times: "Cubs executives did not know of the incident and said they will contact Kawano directly 'to let Yosh know he is always welcome,' senior vice president Michael Lufrano said."

In all, Kawano worked under 37 Cubs managers, 12 general managers and two owners. He was elected to the Cubs Hall of Fame for his services to the team.

== Personal life ==
Kawano's brother, Nobu "Nobe" Kawano, was clubhouse manager for the Los Angeles Dodgers from 1959 to 1991. Towards the end, the two lived in the same nursing home in Los Angeles, California.

Kawano died on June 25, 2018, at a nursing home in Los Angeles, California, of complications from Parkinson's disease and dementia.
