= Kiyo Sato =

Japanese-American writer

- Born: 1923 (age 102–103)
- Notable works: Kiyo's Story: A Japanese-American Family's Quest for the American Dream (2009)
- Notable awards: William Saroyan International Prize

Kiyo Sato (born 1923) is a Japanese-American writer. She is the author of Kiyo's Story, an autobiographical book which won the 2008 William Saroyan International Prize for nonfiction.

== History ==
Sato was born in the 1920s as the ninth child of a family of strawberry farmers in Sacramento, California.

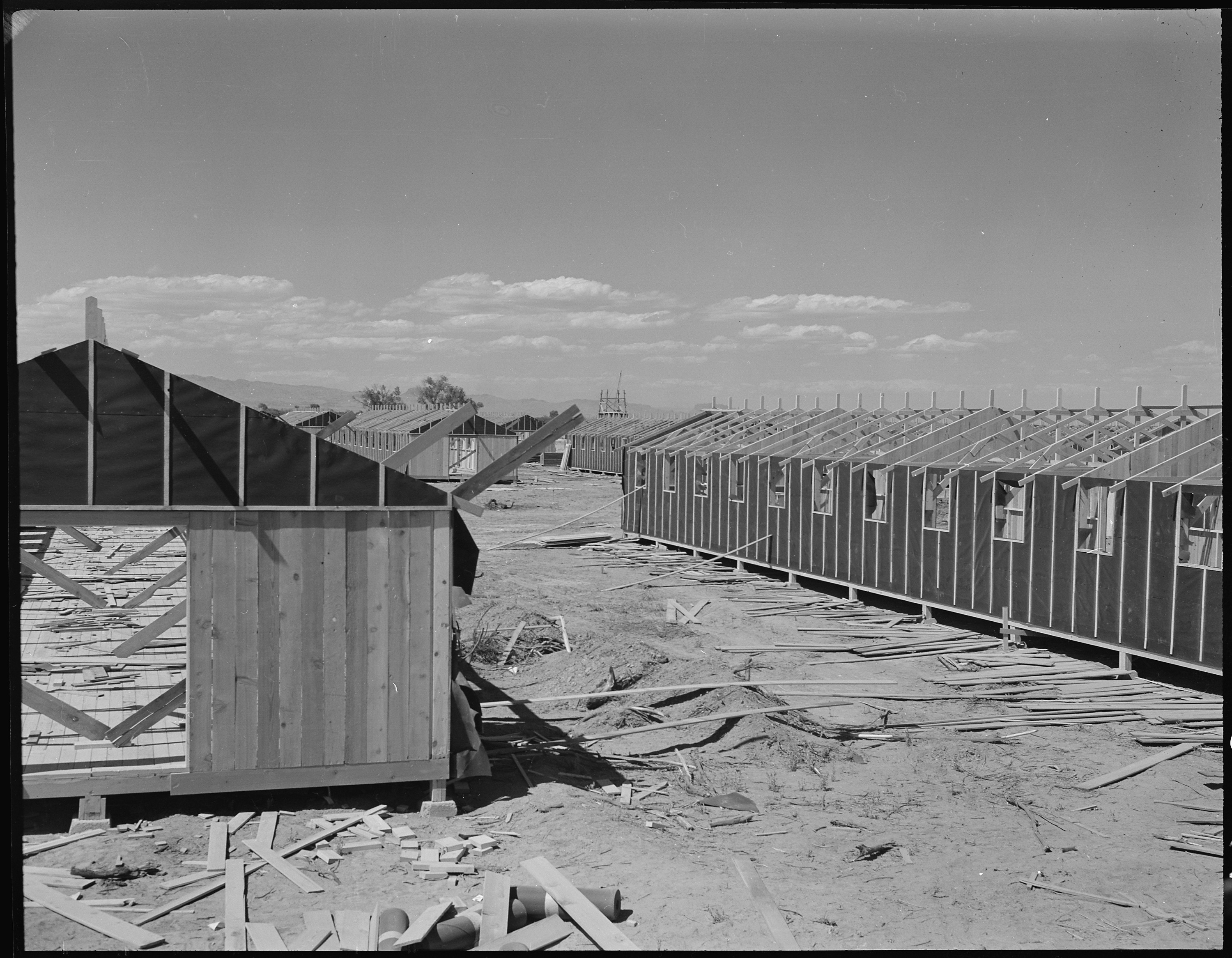
Picture of the camp while it was being constructed in 1942

Following the Pearl Harbor attacks in December 1941 and enforcement of Executive Order 9066, Sato, then a student at the Sacramento City College, was taken to the Poston War Relocation Center in Poston, Arizona, where she remained in detention from 1942 to 1945. Her assigned identification code was 25217 C. Sato told ABC10 in 2023 that she still suffered from PTSD due to her experiences during internment.
