= Daniel Okimoto =

Japanese-American academic (b.1942)

Daniel Iwao Okimoto (born 1942) is a Japanese-American academic and political scientist.

== Early life ==
Okimoto was born at the Santa Anita Assembly Center during the early stages of the World War II Internment of Japanese Americans. As an infant, he was sent along with his family to the Poston War Relocation Center in Arizona as part of the enforcement of Executive Order 9066.

A roommate and friend of Bill Bradley at Princeton University, Okimoto graduated cum laude in 1965, and his postgraduate studies at Harvard University earned a master's degree in 1967. He continued his studies at the University of Tokyo from 1968 through 1970. His Ph.D. in political sciences was conferred by the University of Michigan in 1975.

== Academic career ==
Okimoto is a Professor Emeritus in the Department of Political Science at Stanford University. He is also Director Emeritus and co-founder of the Walter H. Shorenstein Asia/Pacific Research Center (APARC) at Stanford University. Shorenstein APARC is part of the Freeman Spogli Institute for International Studies (FSI) at Stanford University.

== Selected works ==
- 1988 -- The Japan-American Security Alliance: Prospect for the Twenty-First Century. Stanford: Asia/Pacific Research Center, Institute for International Studies, Stanford University. OCLC 39677150
- 1984 -- Competitive Edge: the Semiconductor Industry in the U.S. and Japan with Takuo Sugano, Franklin B. Weinstein, M. Thérèse Flaherty. Stanford: Stanford University Press. ISBN 978-0-8047-1225-5; OCLC 10640450
- 1971 -- American in Disguise. New York: Walker/Weatherhill. ISBN 978-0-8027-2438-0; OCLC 130056

== Honors ==
- Order of the Rising Sun, Gold Rays with Neck Ribbon, 2007.
- Prime Minister's Commendation, 2004.
