= Jack Fujimoto =

American academic administrator (1928–2021)

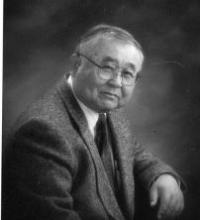

Masakazu Jack Fujimoto (Japanese: 藤本 正和, July 19, 1928 – November 26, 2021) was an American academic administrator. He was the first Asian American to become president of a major higher education institution in the mainland of the United States when he became president of Sacramento City College in 1977. He was awarded with Japan's Order of the Rising Sun award on November 15, 2011, for his contributions to the advancement of Japanese language studies and the promotion of Japan studies and Japanese culture.

== Biography ==
Fujimoto was born in 1928 in National City, California, of parents Morizo (Issei from Hiroshima, Japan) and Emi (Nisei born in Glendale, California). When Fujimoto was 13, he was evacuated from Encinitas, California, along with his parents and siblings and interned at the Poston War Relocation Center in Arizona following the signing of Executive Order 9066. Fujimoto and his family were released from Poston in 1945, and they resettled in Encinitas. Following Fujimoto's graduation from high school, he volunteered in the U.S. Army, where he was trained in Counter-Intelligence and served in Japan during the Korean War.

Coming from a farming background, Fujimoto was expected to follow the tradition of oldest son following the patriarch. However, he was released to be the first in his family to pursue a college education and he obtained his A.A. degree at Pasadena City College and his B.S., M.B.A., and Ph.D. at University of California, Los Angeles.

Fujimoto's specialty in the Japanese language carried forth in his life. He taught Japanese language for 12 years at Venice Gakuen, a private community school at the Venice Japanese Community Center. He worked closely with Los Angeles Unified School District and Culver City Unified School District schools to get credit for Venice Gakuen Japanese language students to meet the language requirements for the University of California institutions. Today, that credit recognition continues to persist for all private Japanese language learners who pass a credit test.

In 1969, Fujimoto was selected as a dean at Los Angeles Pierce College in Woodland Hills, California. There, he established the Japanese language as an elective for college credit. He also introduced a course in Man and Humanities in East Asia. Subsequently, Fujimoto became president of West Los Angeles College in 1979, where he introduced and taught Japanese language as a recognized college elective course. He did the same when he became president at Los Angeles Mission College in the San Fernando Valley in 1989. Today, those courses of study in Japanese continue at these colleges in the Los Angeles Community College District. Fujimoto served as president at Los Angeles Mission College for seven years until 1996. From 2002 to 2003, he served as interim superintendent-president of Imperial Valley College in Imperial County, California.

While designing the Japanese language curriculum and humanities curriculum, Fujimoto visited various universities as well as the Ministry of Education in Japan. For 30 years, he served as advisor to Kobe Women's University in Kobe, Japan and also taught at the Language Institute of Japan in Odawara, Kanagawa, Japan.

For 12 years from 1983 to 1995, Fujimoto chaired the Board of Trustees of the Institute of Buddhist Studies, a graduate seminary affiliated with the Berkeley, California-based Graduate Theological Union.

From 1986, Fujimoto was connected with the Japanese Institute of Sawtelle in Sawtelle, Los Angeles. He orchestrated the merger of the Institute and its language school, Sawtelle Gakuin, and in 2000 became its founding chairman and president, a position that he held until 2005 when he chaired the 80th anniversary of the Institute and Gakuin. He later served as senior advisor to the Institute and Gakuin. In 2007, he authored the book Sawtelle: West Los Angeles JapanTown, a pictorial history of the Sawtelle, Los Angeles Japantown.

Jack Fujimoto died on November 26, 2021, at the age of 93. His younger brother is cinematographer Tak Fujimoto.

== Honors ==
- Order of the Rising Sun, Gold Rays with Neck Ribbon, 2011.
