= Chizuko Judy Sugita de Queiroz =

American artist

- Born: 1933 (age 92–93); Orange, California
- Education: California State University, Dominguez Hills
- Occupations: Artist; Art educator
- Known for: Illustrations of Japanese American internment

Chizuko Judy Sugita de Queiroz (born 1933) is an American artist and art educator; her paintings depict her memories of a childhood during the Japanese American internment.

== Early life and education ==
Chizuko Judy Sugita was born in Orange, California, the youngest of nine children; her mother died from complications soon after Chizuko's birth. Her Hiroshima-born father owned a nursery. In 1942, her family was sent to Poston War Relocation Center in Arizona, as part of the internment of Japanese Americans during World War II. They were released from Poston when Chizuko was twelve. After the war, she returned to Southern California with her father, and settled in Huntington Beach.

Chizuko Judy Sugita earned a Master of Fine Arts degree from California State University, Dominguez Hills. In 1953, she was chosen as Nisei Week Queen.

== Career ==
"Unanswered Prayers", one of her paintings displayed in the Camp Days exhibit

Chizuko Judy Sugita de Queiroz worked as an art teacher at Palos Verdes High School, and served as chair of the school's art department. After early retirement following a workplace injury, she turned to watercolor painting full-time, and took up her childhood memories of camp life as her theme. Her illustrated memoir, Camp Days, 1942-1945, was published in 2004, with an introduction by George Takei.

An exhibit of her watercolors about her childhood in Poston, "Camp Days, 1942-1945," was first shown at the Palos Verdes Art Center near her home, in 2009. It has since appeared at the Japanese American Museum of San Jose (in 2010–11). She lectures on her life and work, saying "This is what I wanted to leave for my grandchildren, I wanted them to know what their parents and family went through."

Her paintings in the exhibit are mostly of one of two styles: a representational style, or an abstract style with impressionistic abstracts. "Unanswered Prayers", shown to the right, is one of her more abstract paintings. She remarks "Camp made me realize that my prayers would never be answered. I knew my mother would never come back to life, and I would never be a blue-eyed blond." She features to the top right of the painting, which depicts her coming out of a cement shower room, "uncomfortable, sad, and depressed." Many of the paintings in the exhibit depict similar emotions like sorrow, loss, loneliness, and longing; this one also illustrates her insecurity about her body as she moved towards puberty in the camp, where she was required to shower naked with the other women.

Montez Productions made a film of her story, "Childhood Memories of Chizuko Judy Sugita de Queiroz," in 2011. Her art also appears in the documentary "Heart Mountain: An All-American Town," by Raechel Donahue.

== Personal life ==
Chizuko Judy Sugita de Queiroz is married to Richard de Queiroz.
