= Nobe Kawano =

American baseball clubhouse manager (1923 – 2018)

- Born: April 16, 1923; Seattle, Washington, U.S.
- Died: July 27, 2018 (aged 95); Los Angeles, California, U.S.
- Occupation: Clubhouse manager for the Los Angeles Dodgers
- Years active: 1959–1991
- Relatives: Yosh Kawano (brother)

Nobu "Nobe" Kawano (April 16, 1923 – July 27, 2018) was an American baseball clubhouse manager, best known for being the clubhouse manager for the Los Angeles Dodgers from 1959 to 1991.

== Early life ==
Kawano was born in Seattle, Washington on April 16, 1923 to Japanese immigrant parents. His older brother was Yosh Kawano who later became the clubhouse manager for the Chicago Cubs. The family moved to Southern California a few years after Kawano was born. Both brothers were enthusiastic baseball fans but, due to their Japanese heritage, opportunities to play were few.

During World War II, the two brothers and their family were interned at the Poston War Relocation Center in Arizona following the signing of Executive Order 9066. Yosh was, at the time, working as the spring training bat boy for the Chicago White Sox; the team negotiated the brothers' release from the camps.

After being released, Nobe served in the United States Merchant Marine, working on ships which ran supplies between the United States and Great Britain. In 1948, Kawano began to work the Hollywood Stars of the Pacific Coast League as a clubhouse assistant, taking care of team equipment. He then worked one year for the Salt Lake City Bees of the Pioneer League.

== Career with the Dodgers ==
The Brooklyn Dodgers moved to Los Angeles in 1958. Kawano began to work for them, taking over as clubhouse attendant after the death of Charlie DiGiovanna, the attendant who came over from Brooklyn. When the Dodgers won the 1959 World Series, Kawano was voted half of a World Series share by the players.

Kawano played a significant part in the career of Sandy Koufax. After the 1960 season, Koufax threw his equipment into the garbage pile after recording an abysmal 8–13 record, telling Kawano, "There it is. Do whatever you want with it." After cooling down over the off-season, Koufax returned to spring training and found that Kawano had saved his equipment, remarking to Koufax: "I thought you might need these." In 2022, during his statue-unveiling ceremony, Koufax thanked Kawano, calling him a "good friend".

His job involved keeping uniforms clean, preparing post- and pre-game meals, ordering gloves and equipment, and sorting out mails for players. By all accounts, Kawano was beloved by players and by the organization. He worked with the Dodgers until 1991, retiring at the age of 68.

== Personal life ==
Kawano was married to his wife Chizuko, nicknamed "Cheesy". They had three children together: Ellen, Hana, and Frank.

He and his brother Yosh both lived in a nursing home in Lincoln Heights, Los Angeles towards the end of their lives. Nobe died on July 24, 2018 due to complications from dementia and respiratory problems, one month after his brother.
