= Lynne Rae Perkins =

American writer and illustrator of children's books

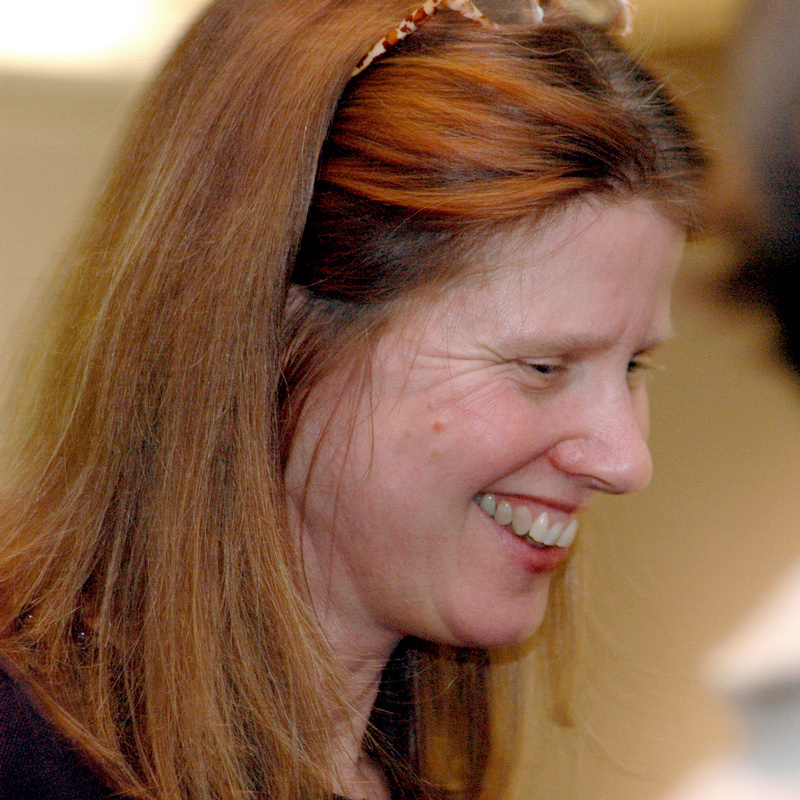
- Occupations: Writer; illustrator
- Writing career
- Genre: Children's literature
- Notable works: All Alone in the Universe (2000); Criss Cross (2005)
- Notable awards: Newbery Medal (2006)
- Website: lynnerae.com

Lynne Rae Perkins is an American writer and illustrator of children's books.

Perkins was born on July 31, 1956 in Pittsburgh, Pennsylvania, and grew up in Cheswick, a small town along the Allegheny River. She studied art at Pennsylvania State University, where she earned a Bachelor of Fine Arts in 1978, and later received a Master's degree from the University of Wisconsin-Milwaukee in 1981. After graduating she held a variety of jobs including teaching drawing and watercolor classes, working as a graphic designer in Boston, and growing Christmas trees with her husband, Bill, after relocating to northern Michigan, all while continuing to draw and paint. In 1993, she showed her illustration portfolio to Ava Weiss, art director of Greenwillow Books, who encouraged her to write her own stories to accompany her drawings, leading directly to the publication of her first picture book, Home Lovely, in 1995. Perkins lives with her family in a small town on an inlet of Lake Michigan.

Her novel Criss Cross, winner of the 2006 Newbery Medal, is a book of vignettes, illustrations, photographs, and poems about a group of four small-town teenagers.

Perkins' picture book Home Lovely was a runner-up for the Boston Globe–Horn Book Award. Her novel All Alone in the Universe was named an ALA Notable Book, a Booklist Editor's Choice, a Bulletin Blue Ribbon Book, and a Smithsonian Magazine Notable Book for Children.

== Works ==
- Home Lovely, (New York: Greenwillow Books, 1995)
- Clouds for Dinner, (New York: Greenwillow Books, 1997)
- All Alone in the Universe, (Scholastic Books, 2000)
- Georgie Lee, illustrator, book by Sharon Phillips Denslow, (New York: Greenwillow Books, 2002)
- The Broken Cat, (New York: Greenwillow Books, 2002)
- Snow Music, (New York: Greenwillow Books, 2003)
- Criss Cross, (New York: Greenwillow Books, 2005)
- Pictures from our Vacation, (New York: Greenwillow Books, 2007)
- The Cardboard Piano, (New York: Greenwillow Books, 2008)
- As Easy as Falling Off the Face of the Earth, (New York: Greenwillow Books, 2010)
- Seed by Seed (Illustrator), (New York: Greenwillow Books, 2012)
- Nuts to You, (New York: Greenwillow Books, 2014)
- Frank and Lucky Get Schooled, (New York: Greenwillow Books, 2016)
- Violet & Jobie in the Wild, (New York: Greenwillow Books, 2023)
