= Cynthia Kadohata =

Japanese-American children's writer (born 1956)

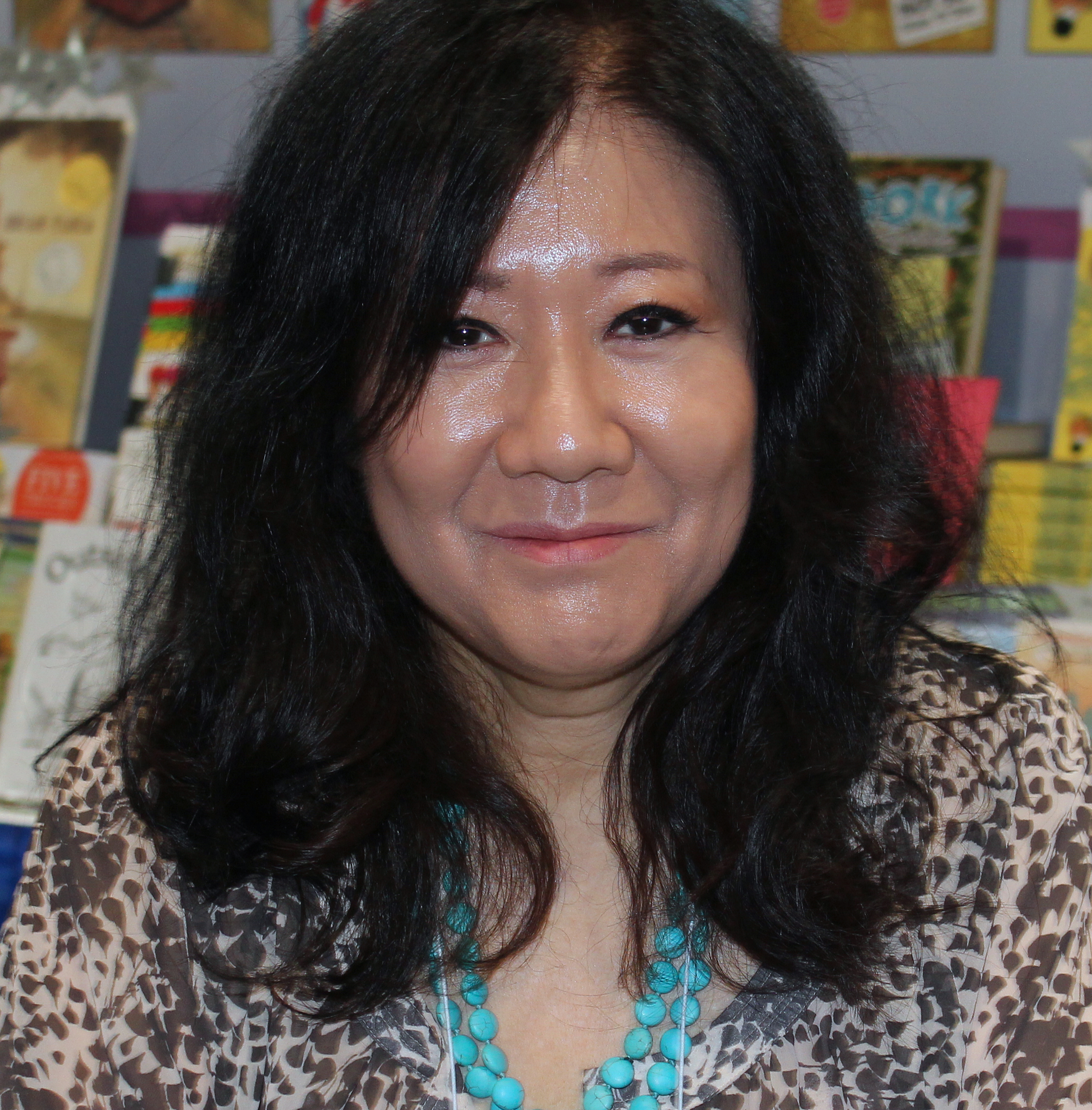
- Kadohata in 2014-2015
- Born: July 2, 1956 (age 70); Chicago, Illinois, U.S.
- Education: University of Southern California (BA)
- Occupation: Writer
- Children: Sammy
- Writing career
- Genres: Children's and Young-adult literature
- Notable works: Kira-Kira; Weedflower; The Thing About Luck
- Notable awards: Whiting Award; 1991; Newbery Medal; 2005; PEN USA; 2006; National Book Award; 2013
- Website: www.cynthiakadohata.com

Cynthia Kadohata (born July 2, 1956) is a Japanese American children's writer best known for her young adult novel Kira-Kira which won the Newbery Medal in 2005. She won the National Book Award for Young People's Literature in 2013 for The Thing About Luck.

== Biography ==
Kadohata was born in Chicago, Illinois. Her first published short story appeared in The New Yorker in 1986. She received a BA in journalism from the University of Southern California in 1979. She also attended graduate programs at the University of Pittsburgh and Columbia University.

Kadohata started her writing career with short story submissions to magazines. Her first publication, titled Charlie O., was published in 1986 in The New Yorker. Later stories were published in The Pennsylvania Review, Grand Street, and Ploughshares.

Weedflower, her second children's book, was published in Spring 2006. It is about the Poston internment camp where her father was imprisoned during World War II. Her third children's novel, Cracker! The Best Dog in Vietnam about the Vietnam War from a war dog's perspective, was published in January 2007 by Atheneum Books for Young Readers.

Outside Beauty, another children's novel, was published in 2008. It is about a 13-year-old girl and her three sisters, all fathered by different men and what happens when she and her sisters are separated from each other after their mother gets into an accident.

At least two of Kadohata's books touch on the topic of chick sexing. The family of the main character in her first novel, 1989's The Floating World, and also the family of the protagonist in 2004's Kira-Kira are employed at chicken hatcheries separating male chicks from female. Kadohata's inspiration was her own personal experience. Her father was a chick sexer during her childhood.

As of January 2021, Kadohata lived in Los Angeles with her boyfriend, son, and dogs.

== Novels ==
- The Floating World (Viking, 1989)
- In the Heart of the Valley of Love (Viking, 1992)
- The Glass Mountains (Clarkston, GA, White Wolf Pub, 1995), illus. Terese Nielson and Larry S. Friedman
- Kira-Kira (Atheneum, 2004)

Newbery Medal
Asian/Pacific American Award for Literature - Youth Literature

- Weedflower (Atheneum, 2006)

PEN USA Award

- Cracker! The Best Dog in Vietnam (Atheneum, 2007)

California Young Reader Medal, 2011
North Carolina Children's Book Award, Ohio Buckeye Children's Book Award, Nebraska Golden Sower, Kansas William Allen White Children's Book Award, South Carolina Junior Book Award

- Outside Beauty (Atheneum, 2008)
- A Million Shades of Gray (Atheneum, 2010)
- The Thing About Luck (Atheneum, 2013), illustrated by Julia Kuo

National Book Award for Young People's Literature
Asian/Pacific American Award for Literature - Youth Literature

- Half a World Away (Atheneum, 2014)
- Checked (Atheneum, 2018)
- A Place to Belong (Atheneum, 2019)
- Vape (Caitlyn Dlouhy, 2023)

== Short stories ==
- Charlie O., (The New Yorker, October 12, 1986)
- Seven Moons, (Grand Street vol 7 no 4, 1988)
- Breece D'J Pancake, (Mississippi Review vol 18 no 1, 1989)
- Gray Girl, (Ploughshares 25, December 1, 1999)
