= Kira-Kira =

2004 book by Cynthia Kadohata

- Front cover
- Author: Cynthia Kadohata
- Original title: Kira-Kira
- Language: English
- Genre: Contemporary Fiction
- Publisher: Atheneum Fiction
- Publication date: 1 February 2004
- Publication place: United States
- Media type: Print (hardback & paperback)
- Pages: 244
- ISBN: 0-689-85639-3
- OCLC: 51861752
- LC Class: PZ7.K1166 Ki 2004

Kira-Kira is a young adult novel by Cynthia Kadohata. It received the Newbery Medal for children's literature in 2005. The book's plot is about a Japanese-American family living in Georgia. The main character and narrator of the story is a girl named Katie Takeshima, the middle child in a Japanese-American family. "Kira-Kira" (キラ キラ in katakana) means glittering or shining.

== Plot summary ==
In the early 1950s, Katie Takeshima and her family live in Iowa, where her parents own a Japanese supermarket. When the store goes out of business in 1956, the family moves from Iowa to an apartment in Georgia, where Katie's parents work at a hatchery with other Japanese families. Katie's best friend is her older sister Lynn, to whom Katie looks up as the most intelligent person she knows. She cites Lynn's ability to beat their Uncle Katsuhisa, a self-proclaimed chess grand master, at his own game, as an example. Katie holds close to her heart the Japanese term "Kira-Kira", which Lynn taught her. They use it to describe things that glitter in their lives. When they first move to Georgia, Lynn guides Katie around her new surroundings and teaches her to always be positive about things. In this period, Lynn is portrayed to be highly sensible and independent, as she teaches Katie to save money for their parents.

When Katie enters school, she has difficulty being the only Japanese American in her class. Her grades are solid average Cs, in comparison to Lynn's ongoing straight As. When Katie is six years old, her brother Samson (known as Sammy) is born. Lynn makes a friend, Amber, and also grows to be a teenager, becoming interested in boys and spending more time with her friends and less time with Katie. Katie also notices Lynn's change in behavior as she starts dabbling in makeup and worrying about beauty. Without Lynn's company, Katie makes friends with a girl called Sylvia "Silly" Kilgore, whose mother also works at the hatchery. However, Lynn starts feeling sporadically fatigued and ill and is diagnosed with anemia. Lynn is eventually diagnosed with lymphoma, and becomes even sicker, and then her friend Amber dumps her, along with Gregg, her boyfriend. The family decides to move into a house of Lynn's choice to help her recover, which appears to work for a short time. However, Lynn relapses from distress when Sammy is caught in a metal animal trap on the vast property owned by Mr. Lyndon, the owner of the hatchery. Lynn's condition continues to deteriorate and she becomes blank and irritable.

Sometime later, Katie goes outside to relax only, and when she returns, her father tells her that Lynn had died. Katie realizes why Lynn had taught her the word Kira-Kira, as Lynn wanted her to always look at the world as a shining place and to never lose hope, though there might be harsh hurdles. Katie tries to support her grief-stricken parents by performing household chores and cooking, tasks she had formerly despised. Throughout this difficult time, Katie becomes just like Lynn, a sensible and independent girl.

The day that Lynn dies, Katie's usually calm and restrained father breaks into an angry rage after seeing Sammy struggle with the limp that he had from getting caught in the trap. He brings Katie to wreck Mr. Lyndon's car, an act which shocks her. Later on, he goes to Mr. Lyndon and owns up to what he did, resulting in him getting fired. Katie is appalled that her father is now unemployed, but he tells her that another hatchery is opening in Missouri, where he will probably work next, though it will be a longer drive.

When the drama dies down, Katie is left with Lynn's diary. On reading it, she realizes that Lynn knew she was going to die and had written a will four days before her death. Katie tries to fulfill one of Lynn's dreams - to get better grades.

To cheer everyone up, the family decides to take a vacation. Katie recommends California because that was where Lynn's dream house by the sea would be situated. The family arrives in California, and when Katie walks on the beach, she can hear her sister's voice in the waves: "Kira-Kira! Kira-Kira!"

== Reception ==
Kirkus Reviews wrote, "The vivid writing and the portrayal of a most loving and honorable father lift this above the norm. "Kira-Kira" is Japanese for glittering, and Kadohata's Katie sparkles." Publishers Weekly called it "moving" and Common Sense Media described it as a "touching tale."

Awards
Preceded by The Tale of Despereaux	Newbery Medal recipient 2005	Succeeded by Criss Cross
