= Roy I. Sano =

Roy Isao Sano (born 1931) is a retired Japanese-American bishop of the United Methodist Church, elected in 1984.

Sano was born on 18 June 1931 in Brawley, California, of Japanese immigrants to the United States. Upon the death of their third child, Roy's parents were converted to Christianity. When Roy was eleven, his family was sent to the Poston War Relocation Center, and then to Pennsylvania under the sponsorship of a Quaker family, where they worked as farm workers. It was during this time that Roy felt a call to the ministry. After World War II the Sanos returned to California, uniting members of their family who had served in the U.S. Armed Forces and those who had served in the Imperial Japanese Army. He is married to Kathleen Thomas-Sano and is the father of three children.

Sano completed his undergraduate studies at the University of California at Los Angeles, majoring in American history. During college he served student pastorates at Oxnard, California (1950–54), and as associate pastor at Christ Church in Santa Maria, California. He was ordained deacon in 1954 by Bishop Donald H. Tippett. He earned his M. Div. at Union Theological Seminary, New York City, in 1957. While in seminary he served as minister of education for the Japanese-American congregation of the United Church of Christ in New York City. Upon seminary graduation he became a member in full connection of the California-Nevada Annual Conference of the U.M. Church and was ordained elder (again by Bishop Tippett). He was then appointed as pastor of the Loomis, California church where we served seven years. Sano did further graduate work at the Graduate Theological Union in Berkeley, earning the M.Th. degree in 1968. He completed his doctoral studies in philosophy at Claremont Graduate School (Ph.D., 1972). During these years he was associate pastor at Wesley Church in San Jose, and then at the Centenary Church in Los Angeles. In 1969 Sano became the chaplain and an assistant professor of religion at Mills College, positions he held until 1976.

During 1972–78 Sano was the director of the Pacific and Asian American Center for Theology and Strategies in Berkeley. He was visiting associate (1975–78), associate (1978–83), and then professor of theology and Pacific and Asian American Ministries at the Pacific School of Religion, serving in this position when elected to the episcopacy in 1984 by the Western Jurisdictional Conference of the U.M. Church. Upon his election as bishop, Sano was assigned to the Denver Episcopal Area. He also served for eight years on the U.M. General Board of Global Ministries. In 1992 he was assigned to the Los Angeles Area (1992–2000). During this time he served also on the U.M. General Board of Church and Society and the General Commission on Christian Unity and Interreligious Concerns.

Sano retired in 2000. He served as executive secretary of the Council of Bishops of The United Methodist Church in Washington, D.C. from 2004 to 2008. He now makes his home in Oakland, California.

== See also ==
- List of bishops of the United Methodist Church
