= Babcock =

Babcock is an English surname. Notable people with the surname include:

- Alpheus Babcock (1785–1842), American piano and musical instrument maker
- Audrey Babcock (born 1979), American operatic mezzo-soprano
- Barbara Babcock (born 1937), American actress
- Betty Lee Babcock (1922–2013), American businesswoman and politician
- Brad Babcock (1939–2020), American college baseball coach
- Brenton D. Babcock (1830–1906), mayor of Cleveland, Ohio
- Charles Babcock (architect) (1829–1913), American architect
- Charles Almanzo Babcock (1847–1922), American school superintendent
- Charles L. "Chip" Babcock (born 1949), American attorney
- Charlie Babcock (born 1979), American actor
- Christine Babcock (born 1990), American runner
- Courtney Babcock (born 1972), Canadian runner
- Edward V. Babcock (1864–1948), mayor of Pittsburgh, Pennsylvania
- E. B. Babcock (1877–1954), American plant geneticist
- Elnora Monroe Babcock (1852–1934), American suffragist, press chair
- Emma Whitcomb Babcock (1849–1926), American litterateur, author
- Erin Babcock (1981–2020), Canadian politician
- Ezekiel Babcock (1828–1905), American farmer and politician
- Jasper Babcock (1821–1896), American politician
- Laura Babcock (1988/89–2012), Canadian murder victim who was murdered by Dellen Millard and Mark Smich
- George Herman Babcock (1832–1893), American inventor
- Harold D. Babcock (1882–1968), American astronomer
- Havilah Babcock (1837–1905), American businessman
- Horace W. Babcock (1912–2003), American astronomer
- Ira Babcock (1808–1888), American pioneer and judge
- John Babcock (1900–2010), last surviving Canadian World War I veteran
- John C. Babcock (1836–1908), rowing pioneer and American Civil War spy
- Joseph Park Babcock (1893–1949), American Mahjong promoter
- Joseph Weeks Babcock (1850–1909), Wisconsin member of the U.S. House of Representatives
- Lorenzo A. Babcock (1820–1860), first attorney general of Minnesota Territory
- Mabel Keyes Babcock (1862–1931), American landscape architect
- Maltbie Davenport Babcock (1851–1901), American clergyman
- Maud Babcock (1867–1954), American educator
- Mike Babcock (born 1979), American college football coach and former player
- Mike Babcock (born 1963), Canadian hockey head coach and former player
- Orville E. Babcock (1835–1884), American Civil War general
- Rob Babcock, (c. 1953–2019), former general manager of the Toronto Raptors NBA basketball team
- Roscoe Lloyd Babcock, (1897–1981) California artist
- Sam Babcock (1901–1970), American football player
- Shelby Babcock (born 1992), American softball player
- Stanton Babcock (1904–1979), American equestrian
- Stefan Babcock (born 1988), vocalist and guitarist for PUP
- Stephen Moulton Babcock (1843–1931), American agricultural chemist
- Tim Babcock (1919–2015), governor of Montana
- Vearne Clifton Babcock (1887–1972), American aeronautical engineer
- Warren Babcock (1866–1913), American politician and educator
- Wendy Babcock (1979–2011), Canadian activist for the rights of sex workers

== Fictional characters ==
- C. C. Babcock, from the sitcom The Nanny
