= Charles Babcock =

Charles or Charlie Babcock may refer to:

- Charles Babcock (architect) (1829–1913), American architect
- Charles Almanzo Babcock (1847–1922), American school superintendent
- Charles Henry Babcock (1899–1967), American businessman (Babcock Graduate School of Management)
- Charles L. Babcock (born 1949), American attorney
- Charlie Babcock (born 1979), American actor
- Charlie Babcock, character in 2006 TV series Pepper Dennis
