= Bird Day =

Holiday celebrating birds

Bird Day or World Migratory Bird Day is the name of several holidays celebrating birds. Various countries observe such a holiday on various dates.

== World Migratory Bird Day ==
International Migratory Bird Day poster 2014

In 2006, the United Nations established World Migratory Bird Day to be held on the second weekend of May every year. The event was founded as an effort of the UN's Agreement on the Conservation of African-Eurasian Migratory Waterbirds to raise awareness of the migratory linkages between regions of the globe. World Migratory Bird Day events have been held in 118 nations. Each year, the United Nations announces a uniting theme for official events. It was formerly known as International Migratory Bird Day. This program is dedicated to international conservation efforts and environmental education in Canada, the United States, Mexico, Central and South America, and the Caribbean. Originated by the Smithsonian Migratory Bird Center, it is now coordinated by Environment for the Americas.

International Migratory Bird Day (IMBD) officially takes place on May 19th in the U.S. and Canada and on the second Saturday of October in Mexico, Central and South America, and the Caribbean each year. Recognizing that this date does not work well for all places or for the migratory birds themselves, sites host these programs at their convenience throughout the year.

This program engages the general public to care about maintaining healthy bird populations and protecting breeding, non-breeding, and stop over habitats used by migratory birds. International Migratory Bird Day programs often are informal science education or informal science learning activities such as bird walks, art competitions, nature based festivals, and presentations. These programs take place in a variety of settings such as zoos, aquariums, protected lands, biospheres, museums, and schools.

Every year International Migratory Bird Day has a new conservation theme with corresponding artwork, educational materials, and activities.

- 2000: Focus on the Falcon, Artist Roger Tory Peterson
- 2001: Taste of the Tropics, Artist Terry Issac
- 2002: Exploring Habitats, Artist Charley Harper
- 2003: Catalysts for Conservation, Artist Gerald Sneed
- 2004: Conserving Colonial Birds, Artist Ram Papish
- 2005: Collisions, Artist David Sibley
- 2006: The Boreal Forest, Artist Radeaux
- 2007: Birds in a Changing Climate, Artist Louise Zemaitis
- 2008: Tundra to Tropics, Artist Eleazar Saenz
- 2009: Celebrate Birds In Culture, Artist Andy Everson
- 2010: Power of Partnerships, Artist Bob Petty
- 2011: Go Wild Go Birding, Artist John Muir Laws
- 2012: Connecting People to Bird Conservation, Artist Rafael Lopez
- 2013: Life Cycle of Migratory Birds, Artist Barry Kent MacKay
- 2014: Why Birds Matter, Artist Elias St. Louis
- 2015: Restore Habitat, Restore Birds, Artist Amelia Hansen
- 2016: Spread Your Wings for Bird Conservation, Artist Lionel Worrell
- 2017: Stopover Sites, Artist Rocio Landivar
- 2018: Year of the Bird, Artist Paula Andrea Romero
- 2019: Protect Birds: Be the Solution to Plastic Pollution, Artist Arnaldo Toledo
- 2020: Birds Connect Our World
- 2021: Sing, Fly, Soar – Like a Bird!
- 2022: Light Pollution
- 2023: Water: Sustaining Bird Life
- 2024: Protect Insects to Protect Birds
- 2025: Share Spaces, Creating Bird-friendly Cities and Communities

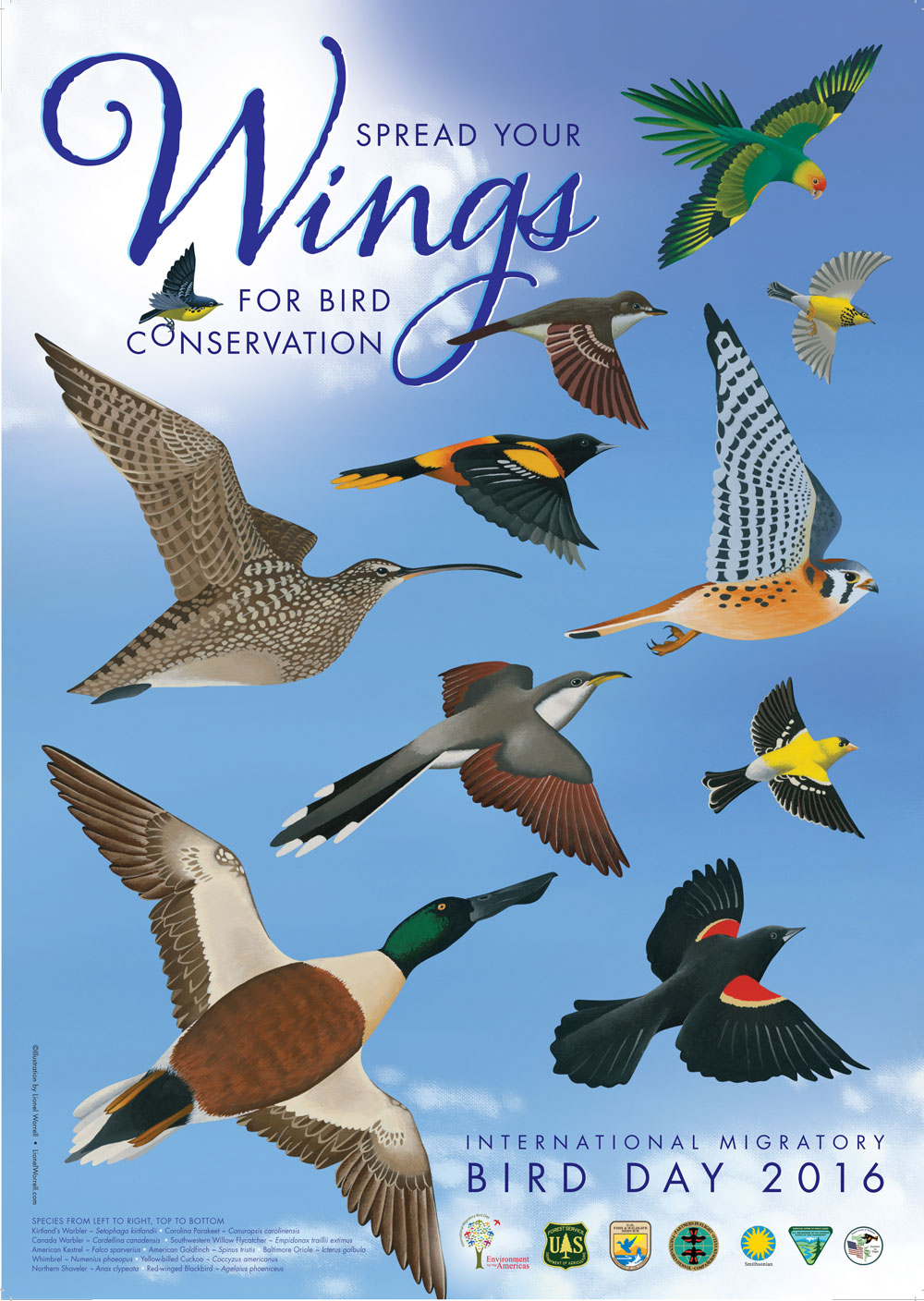
International Migratory Bird Day 2016 poster by Lionel Worrell

Major Partners: U.S. Forest Service, Partners in Flight, U.S. Fish & Wildlife Service, Bureau of Land Management, Nature Canada, Birds & Beans, Pepco Holdings, Get To Know, US Geological Society, Ornilux, Birdzilla, Optics for the Tropics, and Society for the Conservation and Study of Caribbean Birds.

== Bird Day and National Bird Day (United States) ==
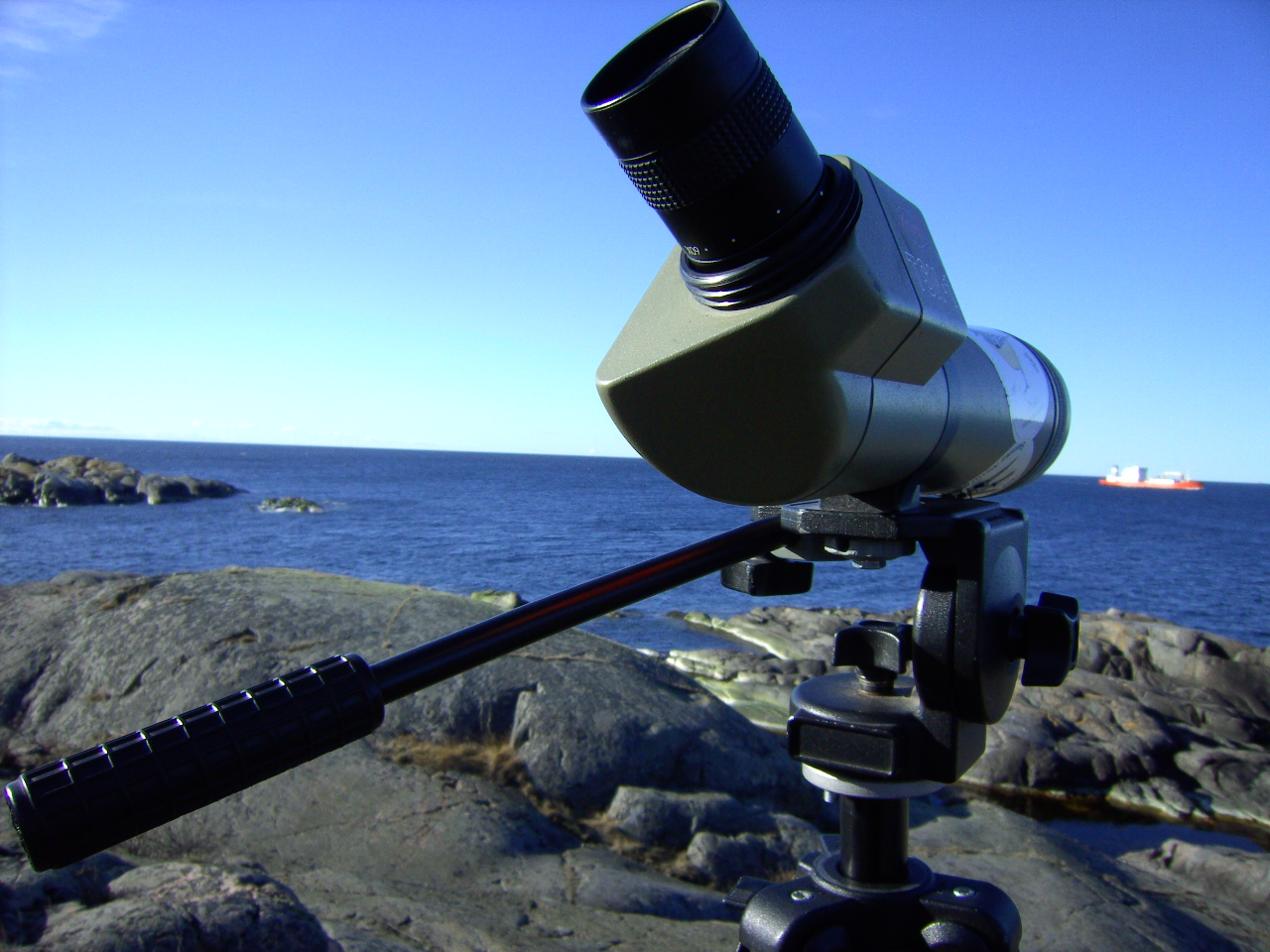
Bird watching at Landsort, April 2009

Bird Day was established by Charles Almanzo Babcock, the Oil City superintendent of schools, in 1894. It was the first holiday in the United States dedicated to the celebration of birds. Babcock intended it to advance bird conservation as a moral value. It is celebrated on May 4 of every year.

National Bird Day is an annual holiday with half a million adherents who celebrate through birdwatching, studying birds, and other bird-related activities. Bird adoption is a particularly important National Bird Day activity. According to the newspaper Atlanta Journal-Constitution, many bird enthusiasts celebrate by adopting birds and by educating future bird owners about the special issues involved with taking care of birds, including their "screaming, biting, constant cleanups, the need for daily interaction and a varied diet". The Avian Welfare Coalition's National Bird Day campaign aims to improve the welfare of parrots and other birds by discouraging their purchase as pets, and encouraging the support of wild bird habitat conservation programs and captive bird rescue organizations and sanctuaries. National Bird Day takes place every year on January 5.

== Bird Day (United Kingdom) ==
Since 1979, bird lovers in the United Kingdom have taken part in the annual Big Garden Birdwatch. In the annual event coordinated by the Royal Society for the Protection of Birds, up to half a million people spend an hour counting birds. In 2009 the Big Garden Birdwatch was referred to as "Bird Day" The Scotsman newspaper.
