= Peter P. Marra =

American scientist

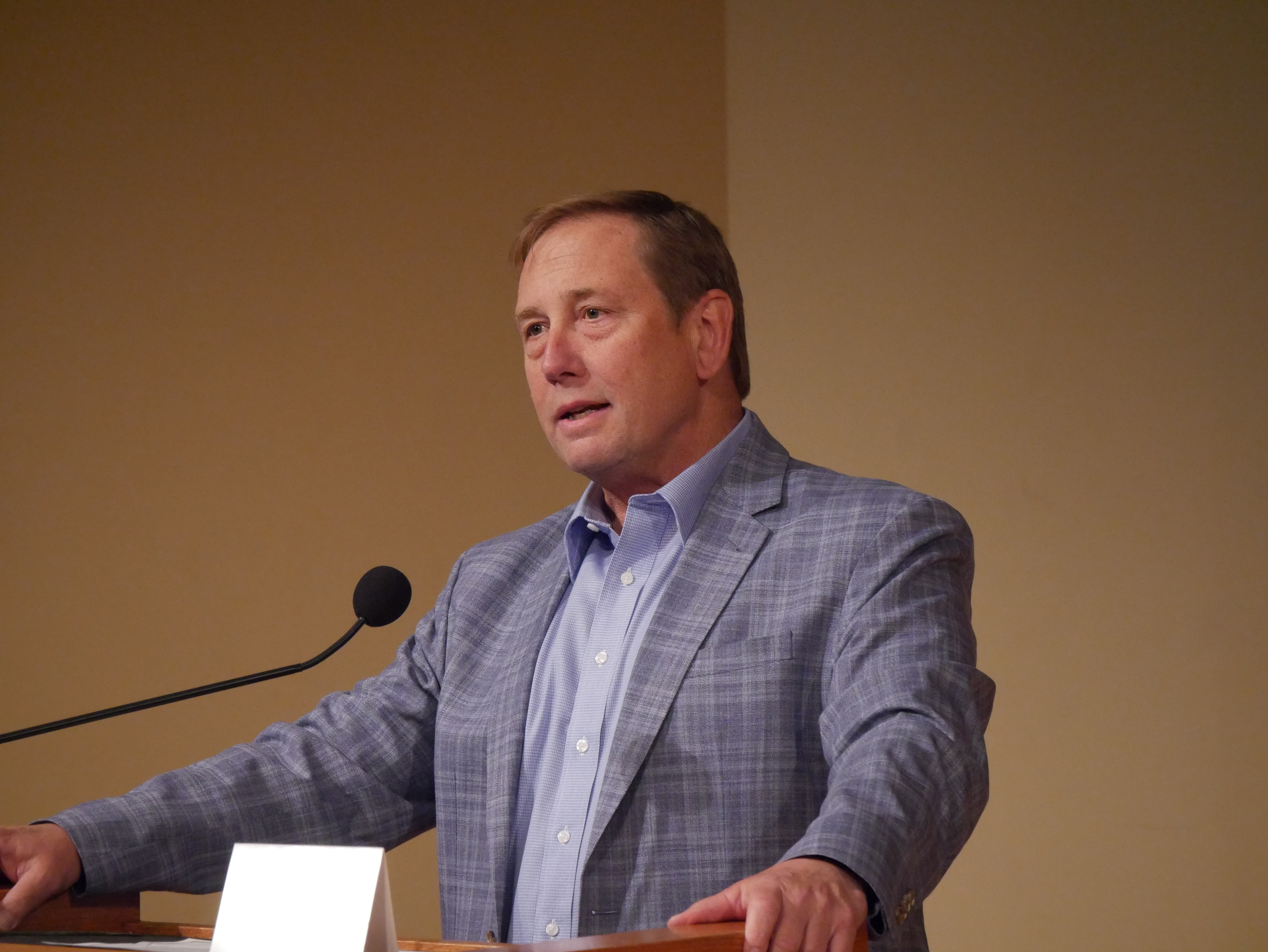
Image of Peter P. Marra

Peter P. Marra is an American ornithologist, conservationist, and educator. Marra is the Founding Director and Dean of the Earth Commons and a biology professor at Georgetown University. Marra is a former director of the Smithsonian Migratory Bird Center. Marra is best known for his research on domesticated and feral cats and their impact on bird populations.

== Career ==
Marra earned a B.S. in biology and chemistry from Southern Connecticut State University, an M.S. in zoology from Louisiana State University in 1989, and a Ph.D. in ecology from Dartmouth College in 1998. From 1999 to 2019, Marra worked as a researcher and the director of the Smithsonian Migratory Bird Center. In 2019, Marra was appointed Dean of the Earth Commons, Institute for Environment & Sustainability, and Laudato Si’ Professor of Biology and the Environment at Georgetown University.

Marra has founded bird conservancy projects including Neighborhood Nestwatch, The Migratory Connectivity Project, and the Animal Mortality and Monitoring Program.

Marra was awarded the 2018 Elliott Coues Award for his contribution to ornithology.

== Publications ==
Among some 260+ publications authored, coauthored, or edited by Marra:

- Linking Winter and Summer Events in a Migratory Bird by Using Stable-Carbon Isotopes (1998) DOI:10.1126/science.282.5395.1884
- Links between worlds: unraveling migratory connectivity (2002) DOI:10.1016/S0169-5347(01)02380-1
- The impact of free-ranging domestic cats on wildlife of the United States (2013) DOI:10.1038/ncomms2380
- Cat Wars: The Devastating Consequences of a Cuddly Killer (2016) ISBN 9780691167411
- Decline of the North American avifauna (2019) DOI:10.1126/science.aaw1313
