= Onoto, West Virginia =

- Unincorporated community
- Location within West Virginia Location within the United States
- Coordinates: 38°16′16″N 80°06′24″W
- Country: United States
- State: West Virginia
- County: Pocahontas
- Elevation: 2,352 ft (717 m)
- Time zone: UTC-5 (Eastern (EST))
  - Summer (DST): UTC-4 (EDT)
- Area codes: 304 & 681
- GNIS feature ID: 1558380

Onoto is an unincorporated community in Pocahontas County, West Virginia, United States. Onoto is located 3.5 miles (5.6 km) north-northwest of Marlinton. The community was possibly named after Onoto Watanna.
