= Mrs. Spring Fragrance =

Book by Sui Sin Far

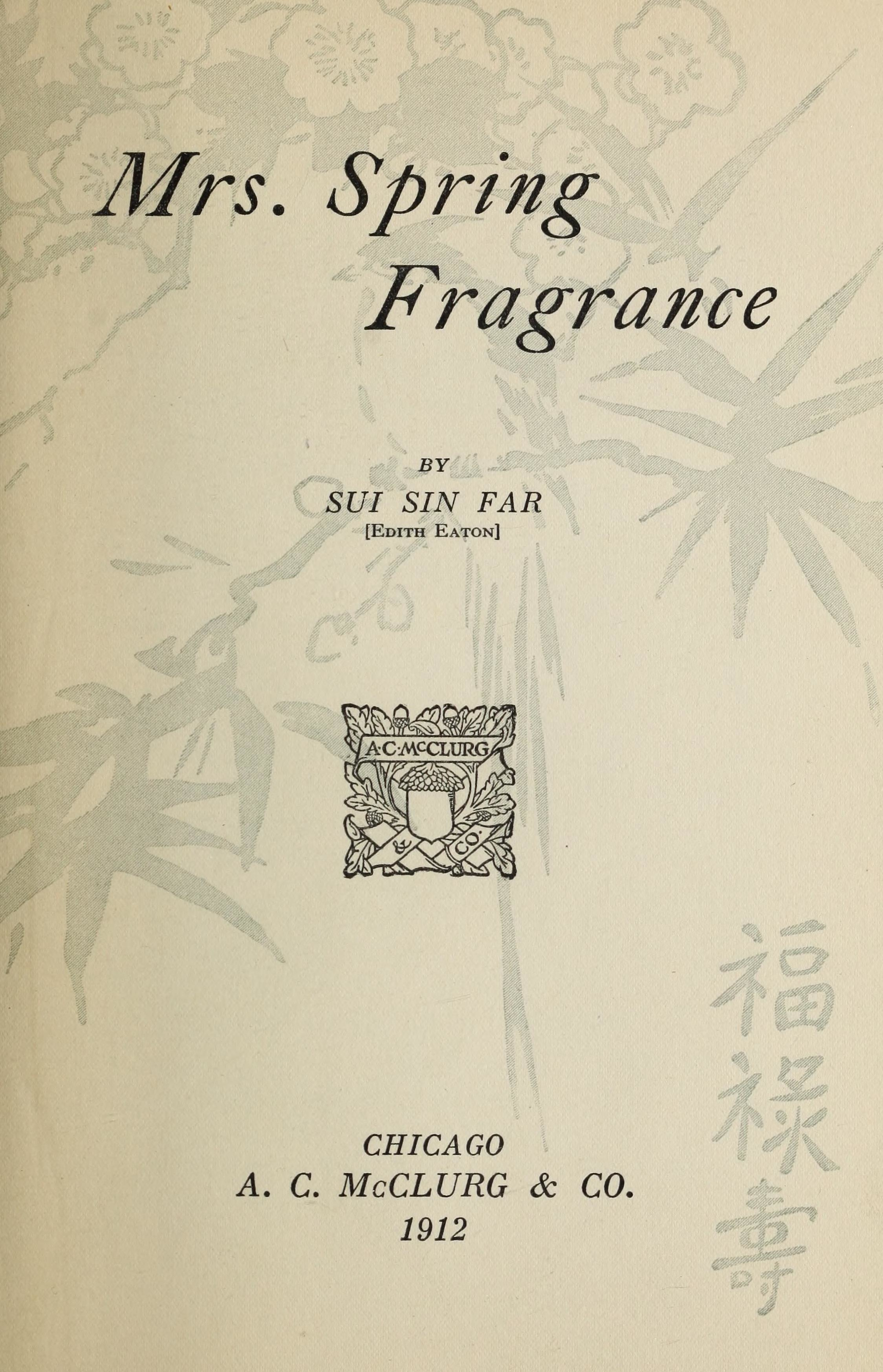
- Title page for Mrs. Spring Fragrance (1912)
- Author: Sui Sin Far
- Language: English
- Genre: Short story, Asian-American literature
- Publisher: A. C. McClurg
- Publication date: 1912
- Publication place: United States
- Media type: Print (hardback & paperback)
- Pages: 347 pp (first edition)

Mrs. Spring Fragrance is a popular short story collection by Sui Sin Far, pen name of Chinese-British-Canadian-American writer Edith Maude Eaton. The work is notable for being "the earliest book of fiction published in the United States by an author of mixed Chinese and white descent." Although the stories in the collection were written in the late 19th and early 20th centuries, they were not compiled into a single book until 1912. The original publisher was A. C. McClurg and Company of Chicago. A new scholarly edition of the book, based on the McClurg edition, was released in October 2011 by Broadview Press.

The stories are divided into two halves, "Mrs. Spring Fragrance" for adults, and "Tales of Chinese Children" for children. Set in Seattle and San Francisco, they reflect the struggles and joys in the daily lives of Chinese families in North America. Particularly poignant are the stories delineating the cultural conflicts of Eurasians and recent immigrants. In "In the Land of the Free", Eaton shows the suffering inflicted by discriminatory immigration laws.

== Contents ==
- Mrs. Spring Fragrance
- The Inferior Woman - The author of The Inferior Woman is Su Sin Far or (Edith Eaton) 1865–1914. This story is about a culturally complex dynamic from the era in time where women were considered inferior. The character Mrs. Spring Fragrance has a neighbor with a son. The neighbor, Mrs. Carman, wants her son to marry someone of higher social standing, or a modern woman with a good family background and education. In this story, the woman that she wants her son to marry is called Superior Woman. However, Mrs. Spring Fragrance knows that the boy is in love with another girl, known to her as Inferior Woman. Inferior Woman is a girl who sought a job at the neighbor's son's law firm and rose to the rank of secretary through hard work, but Mrs. Carman sees that as a negative, though she calls herself a women's suffragist. Mrs. Fragrance sets out to change Mrs. Carman's mind and eventually succeeds, leading to the marriage of her son and Inferior Woman, whom she no longer regards as inferior.
- The Wisdom of the New
- "Its Wavering Image" - "Its Wavering Image" is the fourth short story to appear in Sui Sin Far's 1912 short story collection, Mrs. Spring Fragrance. It follows Pan, a half-white and half-Chinese girl living in San Francisco's Chinatown, and Mark Carson, a white journalist. The two befriend each other, and eventually fall in love for a brief period of time. The story explores their interactions, which are largely focused on the characters' perceptions of Pan's racial identity. University of Kansas scholar Caroline Porter argues that these perceptions are likely influenced by the story's setting—Chinatown in San Francisco—because of the various cultural dynamics present in Chinatown at the time the story was published.
- The Story of One White Woman Who Married A Chinese
- Her Chinese Husband
- The Americanizing of Pau Tsu
- In The Land of the Free
- The Chinese Lily
- The Smuggling of Tie Co
- The God of Restoration
- The Prize China Baby
- Lin John
- Tian Shan's Kindred Spirit
- The Sing Song Woman

From Tales of Chinese Children:

- Children of Peace
- The Banishment of Ming and Mai
- The Story of a Little Chinese Seabird
- What About the Cat?
- The Dreams that Failed
- The Heart's Desire
- Misunderstood
- A Chinese Boy-Girl
- Pat and Pan
