= Young Desire (film) =

1930 film

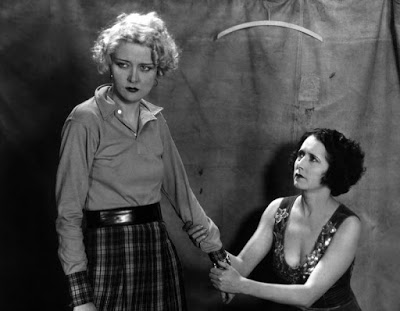
- Mary Nolan and Mae Busch
- Directed by: Lewis D. Collins
- Screenplay by: Winifred Reeve; C. Gardner Sullivan; Matt Taylor
- Produced by: Carl Laemmle
- Starring: Mary Nolan; William Janney; Ralf Harolde; Mae Busch; George Irving; Claire McDowell
- Cinematography: Roy Overbaugh
- Edited by: Charles Craft
- Music by: Sam Perry
- Production company: Universal Pictures
- Distributed by: Universal Pictures
- Release date: June 8, 1930
- Running time: 68 minutes
- Country: United States
- Language: English

Young Desire is a 1930 American pre-Code drama film directed by Lewis D. Collins and written by Winnifred Reeve, C. Gardner Sullivan, and Matt Taylor. The film stars Mary Nolan, William Janney, Ralf Harolde, Mae Busch, George Irving, and Claire McDowell. The film was released on June 8, 1930, by Universal Pictures.

== Plot ==
Helen Herbert works as a dancer in a carnival show. Determined to change her life and find a more dignified existence, she flees from her despotic boss, Blackie. While attempting to steal some oranges out of hunger, she meets Bobby Spencer. The young man seems to immediately take a liking to her and offers to follow him to Spencerville, the city where he lives. He offers her a place to stay until she can afford her rent, but in the meantime, they fall in love, and Bobby proposes marriage. She willingly accepts, but his parents are categorically against it due to the girl's scandalous past. Bobby's mother personally visits Helen to ask her to end the relationship. Recognizing the difficulties it would cause him, she accepts and goes back to being a dancer at the carnival show. However, Bobby is determined to marry her and follows her, but she hides to avoid being found. Although Bobby's father now supports the marriage, Helen believes her past as a dancer would only harm Bobby. So ultimately decides to end her life by jumping from the hot air balloon at the carnival show. Bobby departs in tears with his father, resolving to move on with his life.

== Cast ==
- Mary Nolan as Helen Herbert
- William Janney as Bobby Spencer
- Ralf Harolde as Blackie
- Mae Busch as May Roberts
- George Irving as Mr. Spencer
- Claire McDowell as Mrs. Spencer
