= Shade-grown coffee =

Coffee grown under a canopy of trees

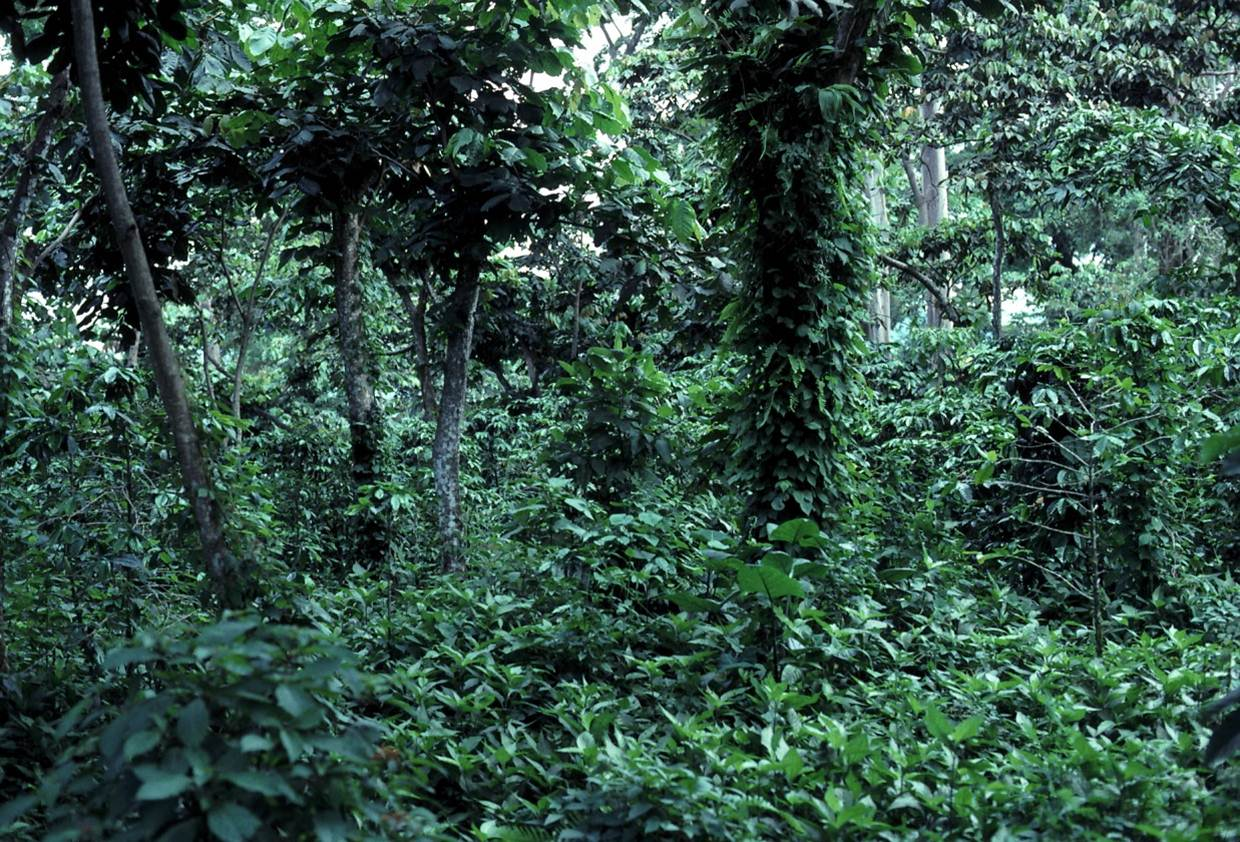
Shade grown coffee in Guatemala

Shade-grown coffee is a form of crop produced from coffee plants grown under a canopy of trees.A canopy of assorted types of shade trees is created to cultivate shade-grown coffee. This method allows shade-grown coffee systems to mimic natural forest conditions, and also promotes ecological interactions. Increased canopy cover in coffee systems has been shown to enhance biodiversity and support conservation efforts.

Shade-grown coffee systems can improve soil stability, reduce erosion, and enhance water retention, compared to full-sun systems. Further, shade-grown systems can also contribute to climate change mitigation, as it supports carbon storage and reduces deforestation.

Because it incorporates principles of natural ecology to promote natural ecological relationships, shade-grown coffee can be considered an offshoot of agricultural permaculture or agroforestry. The resulting coffee can be marketed as "shade-grown".

== History ==
Coffee (especially Coffea arabica) is a small tree or shrub that grows in forests in its wild form, and was traditionally grown for commercial purposes under other trees that provided shade. Since the mid-1970s, new sun-tolerant trees and shrubs have been developed in response to fungal disease presence, especially coffee leaf rust (Hemileia vastatrix), and with an aim to yield higher production rates. As a result of modernization and a push for higher yielding crops, sun-tolerant coffee plants were created to produce larger yields through higher-density, open planting, but cultivation practices used for them may be unsustainable and often have a negative impact on the environment. This has resulted in a new trend in support of shade-grown coffee. Although shade-grown coffee is a production system widely regarded as environmentally sustainable, enabling biodiversity conservation, enhancing pest-control services from birds, and contributing to climate change adaptation, there is an important potential tradeoff, namely lower coffee yields. Yet few studies have explicitly examined this tradeoff and the economic incentives required for smallholders to adopt shade practices. A 2014 study has shown that the proportion of land used to cultivate shade-grown coffee, relative to the total land area used for coffee cultivation, has fallen by nearly 20% since 1996.

== Ecological impacts ==
=== Species diversity ===
Recent studies have shown that there is a direct correlation between the structural complexity of a coffee plantation and the number of species that can be found there. The forest-like structure of shade coffee farms provides habitat for a great number of migratory and resident birds, reptiles, ants, butterflies, bats, plants and other organisms.Of all agricultural land uses, shade-grown coffee is most likely the crop that supports the highest diversity of migratory birds, native flora and fauna. In all of the studies, a clear spectrum of species richness emerged ranging from high species diversity in "rustic" shaded polycultures to extremely low species diversity in unshaded monocultures. Shade-grown systems provide important habitat for birds and other wildlife due to their forest like environments.

==== Plants ====
Biological diversity in traditional "rustic" plantations can be extremely high, ranging from 90 to 120 species of plants on a single site. Tree species richness in shade-grown coffee sites ranges from 13 to 58 species per site. Herb diversity was found to be 2 to 4 times that of tree diversity on any given site, and shrub diversity was fairly low in all sites. Epiphytes are also extremely diverse in shaded polycultures; 90 total epiphytic species were found in 10 sites of shade-grown coffee plots.

==== Insects ====
Insect communities can be fairly complex in shaded coffee plantations. 609 species of insects from 258 families were found in a sample from ground level to 2 meters in a shaded polyculture coffee plantation near Tapachula, Chiapas. 37% of the individuals were herbivores that could be a potential crop pest if not kept in check by the predators and parasites, which represented 42% of the total species.

==== Birds ====
Shade-grown coffee provides important habitat for both native and migratory bird species. The most prominent migratory species, which breed in North America and overwinter in the tropics, include warblers, flycatchers, vireos, and redstarts. 184 bird species, 46 being migratory, were recorded in traditional coffee plantations near Soconusco, Chiapas, while as few as 6 to 12 species were recorded in an unshaded monoculture. In a study of shade vs. sun coffee comparisons in Guatemala, overall bird abundance and diversity were 30% and 15% greater, respectively, in shaded farms than sun farms. Shade-grown trees house two-thirds of the bird species found in natural forests in the same geographic areas. Much greater densities of migratory birds were found in shade-grown coffee sites than in local natural habitats. This is most likely due to the greater abundances of bird-dispersed fruit trees, flowering plants, and insects found in the shade sites. Bird communities in traditional polycultures are composed mainly of canopy and midstory species feeding on fruit, insects, and nectar.

==== Mammals ====
A study in the Western Ghats of India showed that 28 species of mammals occurred in shade-coffee plantations. This study also showed that distance from protected wildlife reserves had a negative influence on mammal species richness.

=== Biotic processes ===
==== Pest control ====
The high species diversity found in shaded polycultures allows for relatively complex food webs to form. Birds and mammals alike play a large role in pest control by eating many herbivorous insects. In a study in Jamaica, birds were excluded from one coffee plantation and resulted in a 70% increase in the proportion of coffee fruits infected by the coffee berry borer, an insect pest species. Biological control by birds acting as predators on the coffee berry borer in Jamaica was calculated to be worth $75/hectare in 2005, averaging $1004/farm studied. This equals about 30% of the per capita gross national income for that time. Another study in Puerto Rico used exclosure plots to exclude lizards, found to be more abundant in shade-grown coffee than sun-grown coffee, showed that the exclusion of lizards led to an increase in leafminers, an insect that is a serious pest to coffee plants.

==== Pollination ====
Many species of bees are attracted to shaded polycultures that have a variety of flowering plants in addition to coffee. This increase in bee abundance results in a direct increase in the pollination of shade trees as well the coffee plants themselves. A study in Indonesia showed that bee species diversity increases fruit set in coffee; coffee plants visited by 3 species of bees had 60% fruit set while those with 20 species or more had 90% fruit set.

=== Abiotic processes ===
==== Soil ====
The presence of canopy and midstory vegetation in shaded polycultures helps reduce soil erosion as well stabilize steep, mountainous slopes. The added leaf litter and other plant material from these shade trees also contribute to increased soil nutrients such as carbon and nitrogen.One comparison in Venezuela showed that unshaded coffee plantations lost twice as much soil to erosion as shaded plantations. In addition, soil moisture can be 42% lower in unshaded plantations than in shaded plantations, which affects biotic and abiotic processes in the environment.

==== Water ====
There is significantly less runoff of surface water in shaded plantations than in unshaded plantations. This results in greater water retention as well as less leaching of nutrients in shaded plantations. Greater water retention is also important for recharging local watersheds. Sun-grown coffee requires numerous chemical fertilizers, insecticides, herbicides, fungicides, and pesticides to be added to promote growth. This also contributes to toxic water runoff and lack of habitat for many species. In contrast to the previous information regarding birds, sun-grown coffee provides shelter for less than one-tenth of bird species.

=== Carbon sequestration and climate change ===
==== Carbon sinks and climate change ====
Just like natural forests, the carbon sequestered in a shade‐grown coffee farm's shade trees will be stored in the tree trunks, limbs, leaves, and roots of the foliage as opposed to being in the atmosphere and adding to global warming. Soil also acts as a sink; soil in shade-grown coffee holds carbon from the organic matter that accumulates on the ground and gets broken down over time. A study on shade‐grown coffee systems in Indonesia showed that soil carbon stocks in the upper layer of soil were equal to 60% of those found in primary forest there, and they showed 58% more total carbon stock in soil and biomass than sun-grown coffee. While shade-grown systems mimic natural forests to promote sustainability, this structural similarity poses a modern challenge for regulatory compliance, such as the EU Deforestation Regulation (EUDR) implemented through 2026. Satellite-based monitoring often fails to distinguish complex agroforestry 'forest gardens', which may include - for instance in Sumatra, a mix of durian, robusta coffee, and papaya - from primary forest. This misclassification can lead to false accusations of deforestation when trees are managed or replaced, potentially excluding smallholders from international markets unless more precise AI-driven identification and easy local verification tools are implemented in time. This bureaucratic challenge could be counterproductive for climate change mitigation by disincentivizing the maintenance of carbon-sequestering, biodiverse agricultural systems. This issue is particularly damaging for the global climate in the case of Sumatra, where oil palm expansion often involves the drainage and destruction of carbon-rich peatlands. Unlike biodiverse forest gardens, the conversion of the peat-rich soils around Gunung Leuser National Park into monocultures releases vast amounts of stored carbon.

== Agricultural impacts ==
=== Positive ===
Coffee trees grown under shaded conditions require less fertilization than trees grown in full sun. For this reason, shade-grown coffee is beneficial to producers who can not afford the cost of fertilization required for intense cropping systems under full sun.

Shade trees protect coffee trees from heavy wind, rain, and sun irradiance. These benefits are especially helpful in environments less favorable to sustainable production. For example, proper shade trees can buffer coffee trees from prolonged droughts and extreme temperatures. Shade-grown coffee farms are considered among the most biodiversity friendly agricultural systems, due to its ability to support a wide range of species.

If the litter from the shade trees (fallen leaves and branches) is allowed to decay on the ground, nutrients taken up by the shade tree can be returned to the system.

Shade conditions can reduce incidences of certain pests such as the Asian white stem borer.

=== Negative ===
Shade trees compete with coffee trees for water and nutrients. In regions where either resource is limited, competition is exacerbated.

Reduced nutrient availability, namely nitrogen, reduces coffee tree yield when compared to intense cropping systems in full-sun conditions.

The shade trees must be maintained (regularly pruned, weeded, fertilized, etc.) and this adds to the cost for the coffee producer. Rigorous evaluation and management of the companion trees is required in order to realize the advantages of shade-grown coffee.

Shade trees contribute to increased humidity and ground litter from fallen leaves and branches. These conditions are beneficial to the proliferation of certain coffee pests and diseases, such as coffee berry borer and American leaf spot.

Revenue potentials are lower for shade grown versus full-sun management systems.

=== Coffee leaf rust ===
There is a complex interaction between shade, meteorological effects such as rainfall or dry periods, and aerial dispersal of coffee leaf rust. Researchers have found that shade may suppress spore dispersal under dry conditions but assist spore dispersal during wet conditions. The researchers acknowledge the need for further research on the topic.

== Types of shade ==
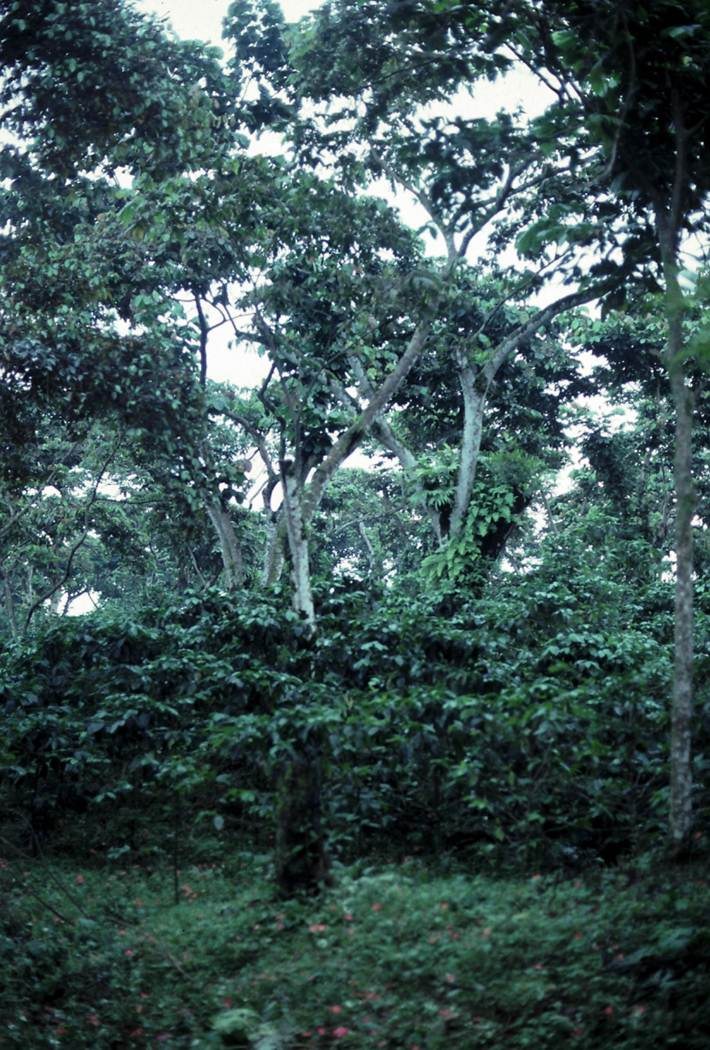
Canopy coverage of a mostly traditional shade coffee plantation. Most of the canopy has been left undisturbed and coffee shrubs have been planted in the understory.

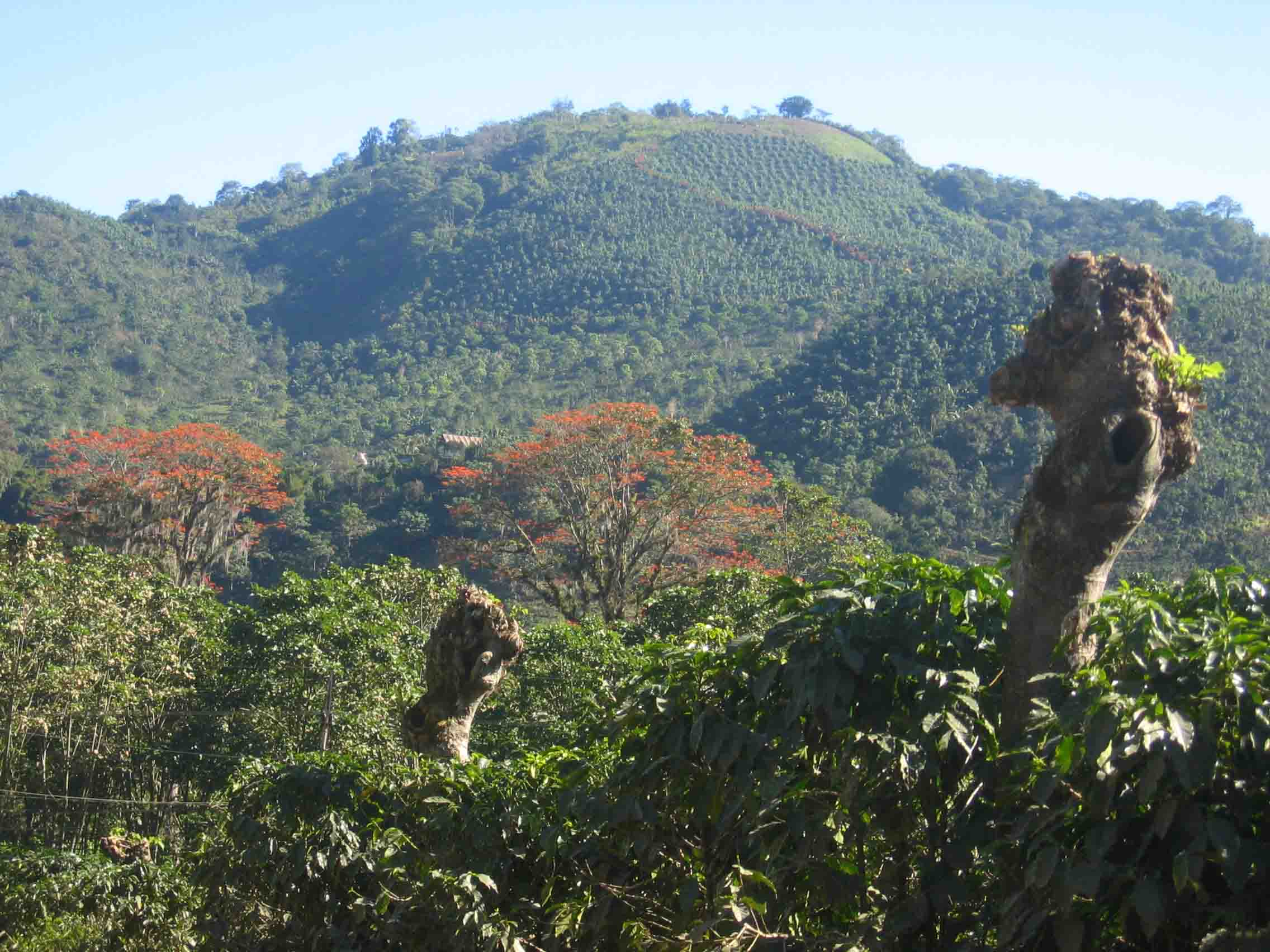
Coffee plantation with shade trees in Orosí, Costa Rica. The red trees in the background provide shade; those in the foreground have been pruned to allow full exposure to the sun.

=== Rustic ===
Rustic is the least intensive and rarest practice. With this method, coffee shrubs are planted in the existing forest with only the lowest strata of the forest removed and replaced with the coffee crop, so there is little alteration of the native plants. This coffee growing system features minimal management and no use of pesticides or herbicides. For this reason, a shade covered coffee plantation may survive economic setbacks by the farmer where an unshaded plantation would not. Being the least capital-intensive method, the traditional rustic coffee system is marked by a low yield. As an example, a large fraction of coffee in India is grown by this method.

=== Traditional polyculture ===
Traditional polyculture involves the integration of beneficial plants, alongside intended coffee crops, which results in more species diversity than commercial polyculture. As with traditional rustic, traditional polyculture introduces coffee plants under the cover of the original canopy. These plants include those useful for home and market, those yielding food, fuel, and medicinal quality. This creates the highest level of "useful diversity" that can be reached in coffee farming. Additionally, this crop diversification helps farmers when coffee prices are depressed.

=== Commercial polyculture ===
Commercial polyculture is similar to traditional polyculture, but some foliage is removed to make room for more coffee shrubs or for trees more favorable to the farmers' needs. Canopy trees are sometimes pruned, and epiphytes are typically removed. There are only two strata in this system, the canopy and the coffee. At this point, fertilizers and pesticides may be required. In this system, coffee yields are higher and production is driven exclusively by the market and as intensification leads to higher carbon footprints compared to traditional systems.

=== Shade monoculture ===
The shaded monoculture system uses a single, usually pruned canopy species to provide shade. Coffee shrubs are planted more densely, and the farm looks very organized and deliberate with a focus on generating products that are solely market-based.

In Mexico, for example, farmers will use almost exclusively leguminous trees (species of Inga) to provide shade for coffee bushes. In south-east Asia, suitable trees include Erythrina subumbrans (tton tong or dadap), Gliricidia sepium (khae falang), Cassia siamea (khi lek), Melia azedarach (khao dao sang, Indian lilac), and Paulownia tomentosa, a useful timber tree.

=== Unshaded monoculture ===
Full-sun or unshaded monoculture represents a "modern" system with absolutely no canopy. Coffee bushes are exposed to direct sunlight and require high inputs of chemical fertilizers and pesticides as well as an intensive yearly workforce. This "modern" system yields the highest output of coffee production but has greater environmental costs.

== Certification ==
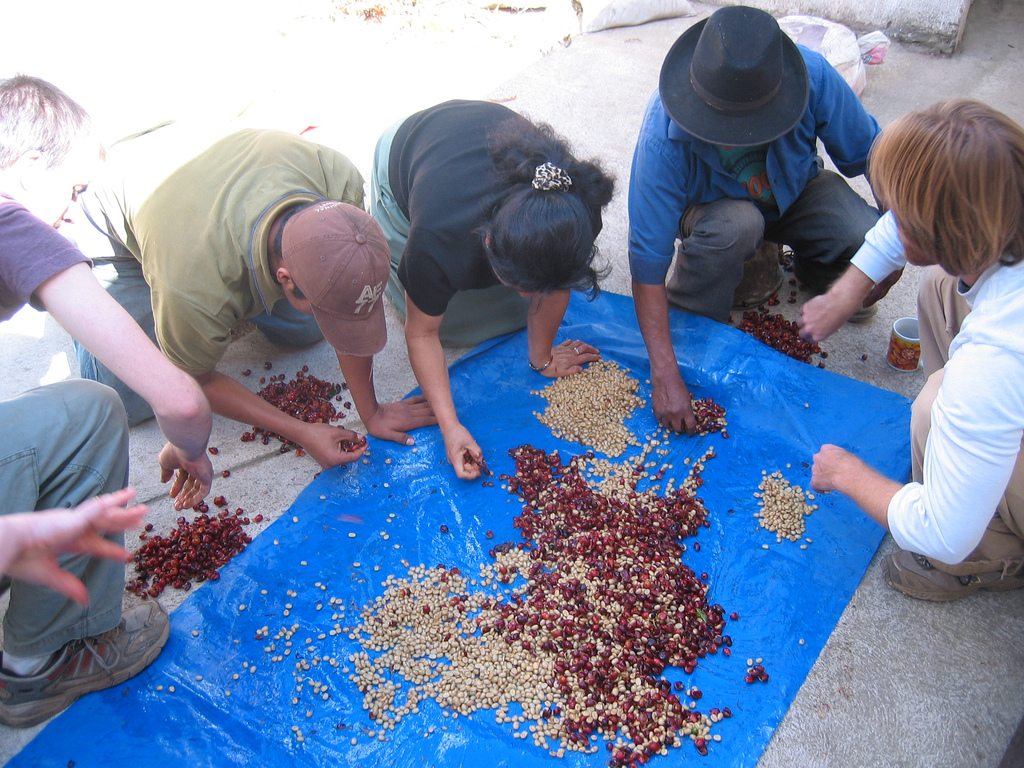
Fair trade shade-grown coffee beans being pulped on a coffee plantation in Guatemala

The Bird Friendly coffee certification program, administered by the Smithsonian Migratory Bird Center (SMBC) has pioneered much of the research regarding the connection between birds, coffee and farming communities to understand the importance of setting standards to create healthy, producing forests. SMBC is considered the gold standard in certification for shade-grown coffee. Although organic coffee certification does not stipulate a shade cover requirement, organic coffee farmers do often employ shade as the leaf litter from an upper canopy provides a natural fertilizer. Certification by the Rainforest Alliance does require some level of shade-cover, but this may be as low as 15% of the land area. A study involving bird lovers and coffee consumers in the US suggests that uptake of bird-friendly coffee may be strengthened by better communicating the impact of coffee production on bird habitat, the unique attributes of bird-friendly coffee (including the high-quality taste), differences among certification standards and credibility, and easy ways to find and purchase bird-friendly coffee

== See also ==
- Organic coffee
- Fair trade coffee
- Sustainable agriculture
