= Partners in Flight =

Bird conservation initiative

Partners in Flight / Compañeros en Vuelo / Partenaires d’Envol is an organization launched in 1990 in response to growing concerns about declines in the populations of many land bird species, and to emphasize the conservation of birds not covered by existing conservation initiatives. The initial focus was on Neotropical migrants, species that breed in the Nearctic (North America) and winter in the Neotropics (Central and South America), but the focus has spread to include most land birds and other species requiring terrestrial habitats. The central premise of Partners in Flight (PIF) has been that the resources of public and private organizations in North and South America must be combined, coordinated, and increased to achieve success in conserving bird populations in the hemisphere. PIF supports education initiatives and is a title sponsor of International Migratory Bird Day.

PIF is a cooperative effort involving partnerships among federal, state, and local government agencies, philanthropic foundations, professional organizations, conservation groups, industry, the academic community, and private individuals. All its meetings at all levels are open to anyone interested in bird conservation. The 5th International Partners in Flight Conference and Conservation Workshop: Advancing Bird Conservation Across the Americas took place August 25–28, 2013, in Snowbird, Utah.

== Partners in Flight mission ==
The PIF mission is expressed in three related concepts:

Helping Species at Risk – Species must be conserved before they become imperiled. Allowing species to become threatened or endangered results in long-term and costly recovery efforts whose success is far from guaranteed. Endangered species must not only be protected from extinction, but also must be recovered to once again play their roles in ensuring the future of healthy ecosystems.

Keeping Common Birds Common – Common native birds, both resident and migratory, must remain common throughout their natural ranges. These species comprise the core of avian diversity and are integral to the integrity of the ecosystems of which they are a part.

Voluntary Partnerships for Birds, Habitats, and People – Conservation of land birds and their habitats is not a task that can be undertaken alone. Partnerships must be formed with others who are working for conservation on the same landscapes, as well as those who depend on those landscapes for their economic and social well-being. The conservation of natural systems is fundamentally necessary for life on earth, including that of humans.

== Partners in Flight goals ==
- Ensure an active scientifically based conservation design process that identifies and develops solutions to threats and risks to land bird populations
- Create a coordinated network of conservation partners implementing the objectives of the land bird conservation plans at multiple scales
- Secure sufficient commitment and resources to support vigorous implementation of land bird conservation objectives

== PIF 36-month Strategic Goals (2012) ==
- Increase capacity to support full lifecycle conservation
- Integrate PIF priorities and objectives into public agency, joint venture, landscape conservation cooperative, and private lands natural-resource planning and action
- Engage PIF's constituencies, audiences, and partners in priority conservation actions through more effective education, outreach, and communications
- Expand the PIF network and increase financial resources to support land bird conservation activities

== Working groups ==
Several working groups were formed for PIF. The international group comprises members from the Caribbean, Canada, and Latin America. The United States has four working groups. Each has a chair and a committee structure that generally parallels that of the national technical working groups (i.e., research, monitoring and inventory, communications, education, and international). The regional working groups' missions are to develop a regional strategy for the conservation of birds within their respective regions by developing bird conservation plans that identify problems, synthesize information, and generate solutions to be used by resource professionals and the general public. Regional working groups foster communication, coordination, and cooperation among agencies, organizations, academic institutions, and individuals interested in conserving birds within their respective regions.

Regions are defined by the states, territories, and countries listed below; some are in two regions by their request.

- Southeast Partners in Flight: Alabama, Arkansas, Florida, Georgia, Kentucky, Louisiana, Maryland, Mississippi, North Carolina, Oklahoma, South Carolina, Tennessee, Texas, Virginia, West Virginia, Puerto Rico, U.S. Virgin Islands
- Northeast Partners in Flight: Connecticut, Maine, Maryland, Massachusetts, New Hampshire, New Jersey, New York, Pennsylvania, Rhode Island, Vermont, Virginia, West Virginia, Delaware
- Midwest Partners in Flight: Illinois, Indiana, Iowa, Kansas, Michigan, Minnesota, Missouri, Nebraska, North Dakota, Ohio, South Dakota, Wisconsin
- Western Partners in Flight: Alaska, Arizona, California, Colorado, Hawaii, Idaho, Montana, Nevada, New Mexico, Oregon, Utah, Washington, Wyoming
- Mesoamerica Partners in Flight: representatives from Nicaragua, Guatemala, Belize, El Salvador, Honduras, Canada and Panama
- Caribbean Partners in Flight: Society for the Conservation and Study of Caribbean Birds
- Educational Partners in Flight Working Group: coordinated by Bird Education Alliance for Conservation

== See also ==
- National Partners in Flight
- Department of Defense Partners in Flight
