= Sui Sin Far =

Canadian writer

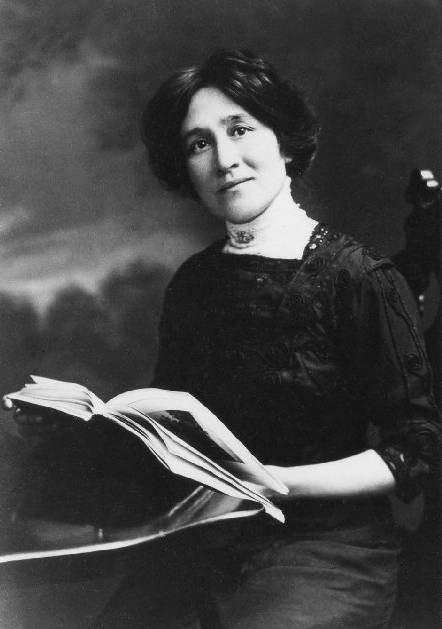
- Born: Edith Maude Eaton; March 15, 1865; Macclesfield, Cheshire, England
- Died: April 7, 1914 (aged 49); Montreal, Quebec, Canada
- Resting place: Mount Royal Cemetery
- Occupation: Journalist
- Relatives: Onoto Watanna
- Writing career
- Pen name: Sui Sin Far, E.E., Fire Fly
- Genres: Journalism, short stories, travel literature
- Subject: Chinese-American life
- Notable works: Mrs. Spring Fragrance "Leaves from the Mental Portfolio of a Eurasian"

Sui Sin Far (Chinese: 水仙花; Jyutping: Seoi2 Sin1 Faa1; pinyin: Shuǐ Xiānhuā, born Edith Maude Eaton; 15 March 1865 – 7 April 1914) was an author known for her writing about Chinese people in North America and the Chinese American experience. "Sui Sin Far", the pen name under which most of her work was published, is the Cantonese name of the narcissus flower, popular amongst Chinese people.

== Life account ==
Edith Maude Eaton was born in Macclesfield, Cheshire, England, Eaton was the daughter of Englishman Edward Eaton, a merchant who met her Chinese mother Achuen Grace Amoy in Shanghai, China.

Eaton was the eldest daughter and second child of fourteen children born to the couple. In 1865, her family left England to live in Hudson, New York, United States, but stayed there only a short time before returning to England in 1868. The family returned to North America in 1872, relocating to Montreal, Quebec, Canada. Her father worked as a clerk for Grand Trunk Railway and perhaps for Hudon Mills. In 1882, he left his job and attempted to earn a living through his art. Nonetheless, the children were educated at home and raised in an intellectually stimulating environment that saw both Edith and her younger sister Winnifred, who wrote under the pen name Onoto Watanna, become successful writers.

Because of their poverty, at a young age, Edith Eaton left school to work in order to help support her family. By age 18, Eaton was setting type for the Montreal Star. She began writing as a young girl; her stories and poetry were accepted for publication in Montreal's Dominion Illustrated magazine, and, beginning in 1890, she published anonymous journalistic articles about the local Chinese community in Montreal's English-language newspapers, the Montreal Star and the Daily Witness. She also worked as a stenographer and legal secretary. She left Montreal first in 1891 to work as a stenographer and special correspondent in what is now Thunder Bay, Ontario. In 1896, she worked as a journalist for Gall's News Letter in Kingston, Jamaica, for about six months, and began to publish under her Chinese pen name. Eaton also published using a Chinese man's name, Wing Sing.

Later, she moved to San Francisco, Los Angeles then in Seattle, before going to the east coast to work in Boston. While working as a legal secretary she continued to write. Although her appearance and manners would have allowed her to easily pass as an Englishwoman, she asserted her Chinese heritage after 1896 and wrote articles that told what life was like for a Chinese woman in white America. First published in 1896, her fictional stories about Chinese Americans were a reasoned appeal for her society's acceptance of working-class Chinese at a time when the United States Congress maintained the Chinese Exclusion Act, which banned Chinese immigration to the United States.

Over the ensuing years, Eaton wrote a number of short stories and newspaper articles while working on her first collection of fiction. Published in June 1912, Mrs. Spring Fragrance was a collection that included some linked short stories that was marketed as a novel.

Eaton never married. She died in Montreal and is interred in Mount Royal Cemetery.

A study of Eaton and her life, Sui Sin Far/Edith Maude Eaton: A Literary Biography by Annette White-Parks, was published in 1995. Becoming Sui Sin Far: Early Fiction, Journalism and Travel Writing by Edith Maude Eaton by Mary Chapman updates this earlier study.

== Themes ==
As a child, Eaton witnessed hatred of and prejudice against Chinese people. This inclined her to write on the Chinese experience, with some of her works focusing on her own experiences as a Chinese person. In In the Land of the Free, Eaton writes about what it meant to be a Chinese woman in a white man's world. Many of Sui Sin Far/Edith Eaton's unsigned works are about the daily lives of Chinese people in Canada and the United States. The topics of these pieces range from the food Chinese people eat to the things they do for fun.

== Contemporary interests ==
Many academics cite Sui Sin Far/Edith Eaton as one of the first North American writers of Chinese ancestry. For this reason, there has been recent interest in Sui Sin Far's works and their revival.

Mary Chapman, a professor in the Department of English at the University of British Columbia, has published Becoming Sui Sin Far: Early Fiction, Journalism, and Travel Writing by Edith Maude Eaton, a collection of 70 of Eaton's early writings. Most of these pieces had not been republished since their first appearance in newspapers. She is also the director of the Winnifred Eaton Archive

Ying Xu, an adjunct faculty member in the Department of English and the Department of Foreign Languages and Literatures at the University of New Mexico, has also been conducting scholarly work on Sui Sin Far. She contributed to the article "Edith Maude Eaton (Sui Sin Far)". In 2017, she published "Sui Sin Far’s “The Land of the Free” in the era of Trump", which makes connections between Far's writings and the current socio-political climate of the Trump era.

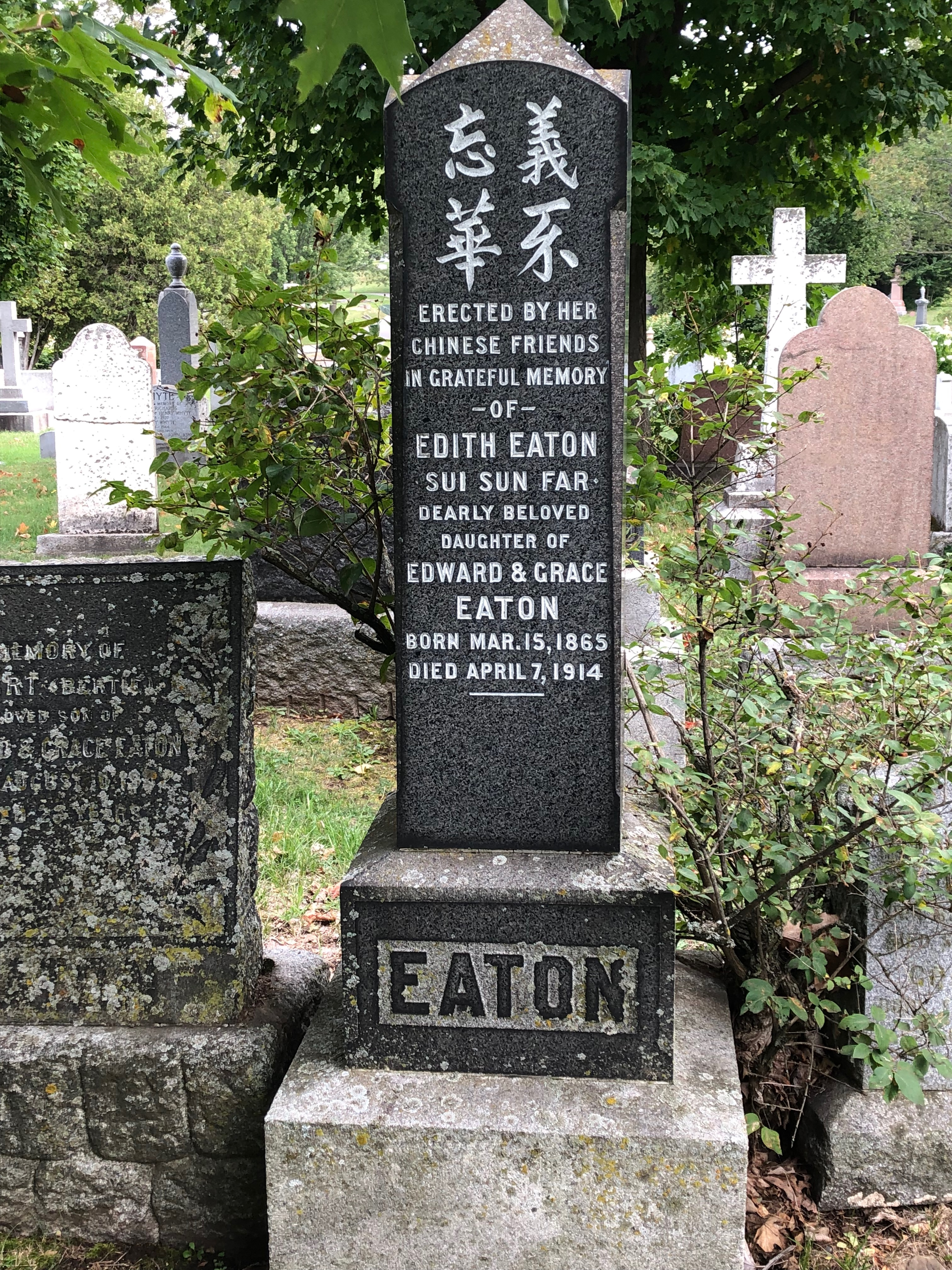
Eaton's funeral monument in Mount Royal Cemetery.

== Published works ==
- Far, Sui Sin. A Chinese Ishmael and Other Stories. Dodo Press, 2009.
- Far, Sui Sin. Mrs. Spring Fragrance. A. C. McClurg, 1912.
- Chan Hen Yen, Chinese Student (1912)
- A Love Story from the Rice Fields of China (1911)
- The Bird of Love (1910)
- An Autumn Fan (1910)
- Leaves from the Mental Portfolio of an Eurasian (1909)

== Unnamed works ==
Mary Chapman's Becoming Sui Sin Far: Early Fiction, Journalism, and Travel Writing by Edith Maude Eaton includes a working bibliography of Eaton's unsigned works:

- "The Land of the Free." Montreal Daily Witness, 15 March 1890: 8.
- "The Ching Song Episode." Montreal Daily Witness, 17 April 1890: 6.
- "A Chinese Party." Montreal Daily Witness, 7 November 1890: 7.
- "Girl Slave in Montreal. Our Chinese Colony Cleverly Described. Only Two Women from the Flowery Land in Town." Montreal Daily Witness, 4 May 1894:10.
- "Seventeen Arrests." Montreal Daily Witness, 10 July 1894: 1.
- [Our Local Chinatown. Little Mystery of a St. Denis Street Laundry." Montreal Daily Witness, 19 July 1894: 10.
- "No Tickee, No Washee." Montreal Daily Witness, 25 July 1894: 10.
- "In the Chinese Colony." Montreal Daily Witness, 6 February 1895: 10.
- "Dined by Hom Chong Long." Montreal Daily Witness, 12 February 1895: 1.
- "The Lady and the Tiger." Montreal Daily Star, 23 March 1895: 1.
- "Half-Chinese Children." Montreal Daily Star, 20 April 1895: 3.
- "A Chinaman and His Bride." Montreal Daily Witness, 17 May 1895: 1.
- "The Gambling Chinee." Montreal Daily Witness, 20 May 1895: 3.
- "Abusing the Chinee: How Some White Christians Treat Them, Rotten Eggs and Stones." Montreal Daily Star, 5 July 1895: 8.
- "Smuggled Chinese: The Last Batch Was Concealed in a Lumber Barge." Montreal Daily Star, 5 July 1895: 8.
- "Chinese Visitors." Montreal Daily Star, 6 July 1895: 4.
- "Thrilling Experience of a Band of Smugglers in the Lachine Rapids." Montreal Daily Star, 9 July 1895: 1.
- "Smuggled Chinamen: Arrested and Sentenced to Terms of Imprisonment." Montreal Daily Star, 10 July 1895: 8.
- "Beaten to Death." Montreal Daily Witness, 22 July 1895: 6.
- "The Dead Chinaman." Montreal Daily Witness, 24 July 1895: 8.
- "A Chino-Irish Family: The Father a Chinaman and the Mother an Irishwoman." Montreal Daily Star, 8 August 1895.
- "They Are Going Back To China: Hundreds of Chinese at the CPR Station." Montreal Daily Star, 21 August 1895: 2.
- "The Smuggling of Chinamen." Montreal Daily Star, 22 August 1895: 6.
- "A Chinese Baby Accompanies a Party Now on Their Way to Boston." Montreal Daily Star, 11 September 1895: 6.
- "Chinese Religion Information Given a Lady by Montreal Chinamen." Montreal Daily Star, 21 September 1895: 5.
- "A Chinese Child Born At the Hotel on Lagauchetiere Street." Montreal Daily Star, 30 September 1895: 1.
- "Chinese Entertainment." Montreal Daily Star, 11 October 1895: 4.
- "Another Chinese Baby. The Juvenile Mongolian Colony in Montreal Receives Another Addition — It Is a Girl and There Are Schemes for Her Marriage." Montreal Daily Star, 12 October 1895: 6.
- "Trouble Over an Opium Deal." Montreal Daily Star, 12 October 1895: 9.
- "Completion of the Moon." Montreal Daily Star, 23 October 1895: 6.
- "Chinese Changes." Montreal Daily Star, 9 November 1895: 9.
- "Chinese Food." Montreal Daily Star, 25 November 1895: 4.
- "The Baby Photographed." Montreal Daily Star, 28 November 1895: 8.
- "The Ancestral Tablet: A Curious Feature of a Chinese Home." Montreal Daily Star, 3 December 1895: 5.
- "Chinamen with German Wives." Montreal Daily Star, 13 December 1895: 5.
- "Will Montreal Have a Chinatown?." Montreal Daily Star, 14 December 1895: 7.
- "Chinese Gambling." Montreal Daily Star, 17 December 1895: 6.
- "One Chinaman Arrested." Montreal Daily Star, 18 December 1895: 6.
- "The Chinese and Christmas." Montreal Daily Star, 21 December 1895: 2.
- "Chinese Entertainment, at which the Chinamen Did Their Share of the Entertaining." Montreal Daily Star, 31 December 1895: 2.
- "The Chinese New Year." Montreal Daily Star, 11 February 1896: 7.
- "John Chinaman Entertains." Montreal Daily Witness, 18 February 1896: 6.
- "Bubble and Squeak Lotus 2" (October 1896): 216-17.
- "Born a Britisher But Fifty Dollars Is the Tax on Him as a Chinaman" Montreal Daily Witness, 27 October 1896.
- "A Visit to Chinatown." New York Recorder, 19 April 1896.

== See also ==
- Winnifred Eaton
- List of women writers
- List of Asian-American writers
- Chinese American literature
- History of Chinese Americans
