= Winnifred Eaton (writer) =

Canadian author and screenwriter

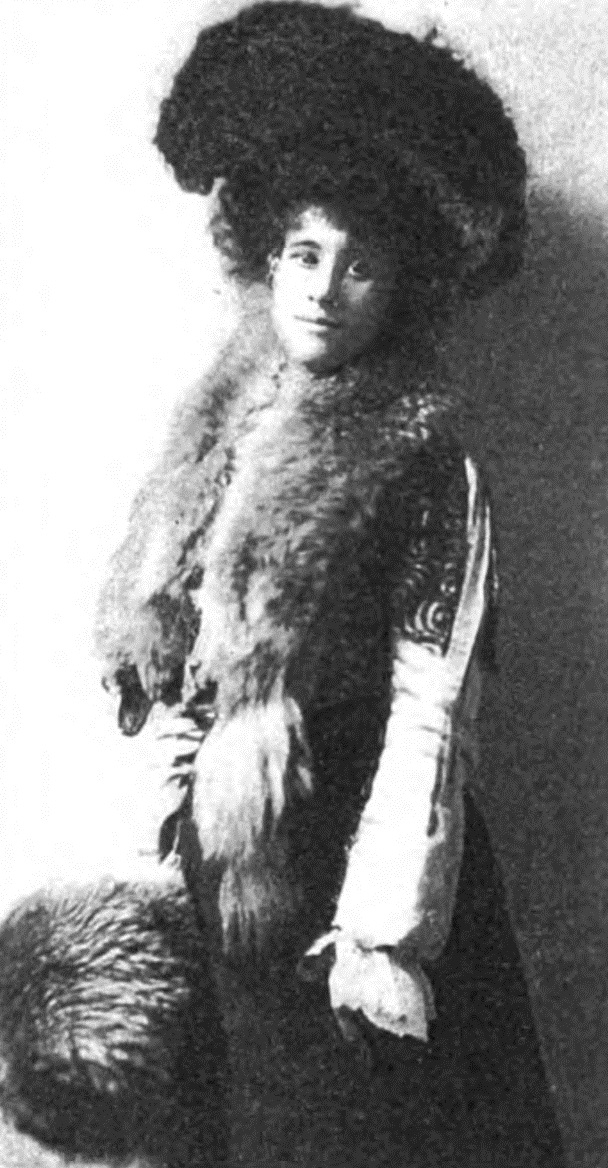
- Winnifred Eaton c. 1903
- Born: August 21, 1875; Montreal, Quebec, Canada
- Died: April 8, 1954 (aged 78); Butte, Montana, USA
- Relatives: Edith Maude Eaton, sister
- Writing career
- Pen name: Onoto Watanna
- Period: 1899–1932
- Genres: novelist, screenwriter
- Notable works: Tama (1910); Me, A Book of Remembrance

Winnifred Eaton (August 21, 1875 – April 8, 1954) was a Canadian author and screenwriter of Chinese-British ancestry. Publishing prolifically under a number of names, most predominantly, the pseudonym Onoto Watanna, she was one of the first North American writers of Asian descent to publish fiction in English.

== Biography ==
Eaton was the daughter of an English merchant, Edward C. Eaton (1839 – 1915), and a Chinese performer, Achuen "Grace" Amoy (1846 – 1922). The two married in Shanghai in 1863 but relocated to England a year later. Over the next few years, the Eaton family moved back and forth from England to the US several times before finally relocating permanently to Montreal in 1872, where Winnifred was born.

The Eaton family was large; Winnifred was the eighth of 12 children who survived infancy. Edward Eaton struggled to support the family, who moved frequently from one lodging to the next. Nonetheless, the children were raised in an intellectually stimulating environment. Winnifred's eldest sister, Edith Maude Eaton, would become a journalist and, under the pen name Sui Sin Far, an author of stories about Chinese immigrants to the United States, and her older sister Grace Helen Eaton would marry fin-de-siècle editor Walter Blackburn Harte.

Winnifred achieved early success, publishing her first stories in Canadian and U.S. newspapers and magazines as a teenager and publishing her first novel, Miss Nume of Japan, in 1898. She would eventually publish over a dozen novels and dozens of short stories and articles.

While living in New York City, Eaton met journalist Bertrand Babcock, the son of Emma Whitcomb Babcock and Charles Almanzo Babcock. The two married in 1901 and had four children, three sons and a daughter; Perry, the oldest, died as a child. Their marriage ended in divorce in 1917, and in the same year, Eaton married Francis Fournier Reeve. Moving to Alberta in her native Canada, Eaton ranched with her husband while continuing to write. For a time in the mid-1920s, she moved to work in the film industry, first to New York in 1924 and then, in 1925, to Hollywood.

She returned to Calgary in 1932 and became an active member of the artistic community, founding Alberta's Little Theatre Movement and serving as the president of the Calgary branch of the Canadian Authors' Association.

In 1954, while returning home from a vacation in California, Eaton fell ill and died of heart failure in Butte, Montana. Following her death, her husband donated funds to build the Reeve Theatre at the University of Calgary.

== Literary career ==
Eaton claimed to be only 14 when one of her stories was accepted for publication by a Montreal newspaper that had already published pieces by her sister. In fact, she was almost 20 when her story "A Poor Devil" was published in Metropolitan Magazine. Eaton left home at age 20 to take a job as a stenographer for a newspaper in Kingston, Jamaica. She remained there for less than a year, then moved to Cincinnati, Ohio, and then Chicago, Illinois, where for a time she worked as a typist while continuing to write short stories. Eventually, her compositions were accepted by the prestigious Saturday Evening Post as well as by other popular periodicals. She published her first novel, Miss Nume of Japan capitalizing on her mixed ancestry to pass herself off as a Japanese American by the name of Onoto Watanna.

In 1900, Eaton moved to New York City, where her second major novel, A Japanese Nightingale, was published. It proved extremely successful, being translated into several languages and eventually adapted both as a Broadway play and then, in 1918, as a motion picture. Her novel Tama (1910) was a runaway bestseller and her novel Me, A Book of Remembrance, a thinly disguised memoir, told a titillating tale of a woman's infidelities. Under her Japanese pseudonym, Eaton published many romance novels and short stories and journalistic works that were widely read throughout the United States. Over the course of her 40-year career, Eaton also had articles published in many popular magazines in the United States, including the Ladies' Home Journal and Harper's Monthly.

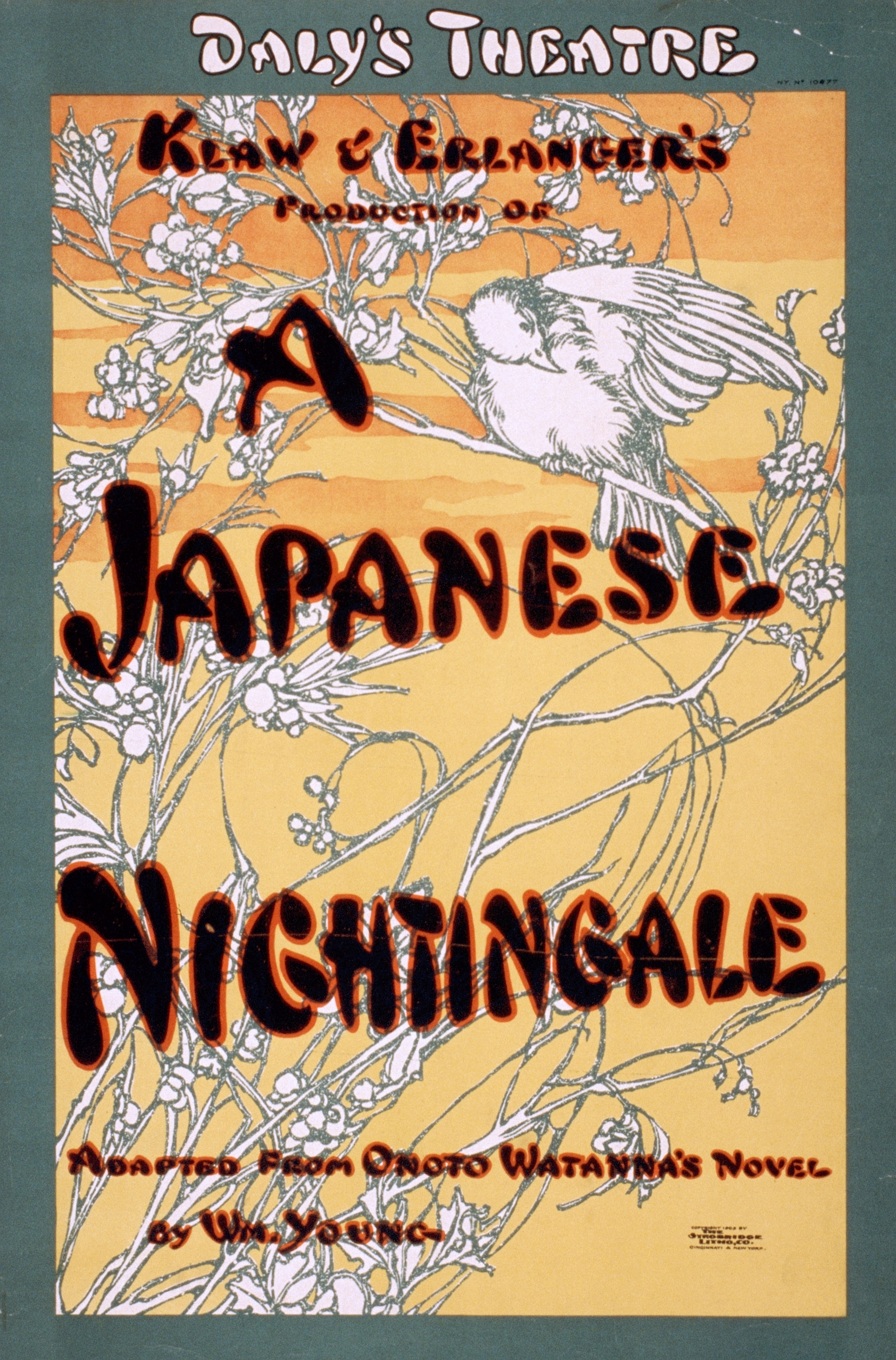
Poster for Klaw & Erlanger's production of A Japanese Nightingale in New York in 1903

In collaboration with her sister Sara Eaton Bosse, Eaton published the Chinese-Japanese Cook Book in 1914. The authors preface their history of Asian food and a representative selection of recipes with the reassurance that "When it is known how simple and clean are the ingredients used to make up these oriental dishes, the Westerner will cease to feel that natural repugnance which assails one when about to taste a strange dish of a new and strange land."

After marrying Frank Reeve and moving to Alberta, Eaton continued to write fiction and journalism, mostly with an Albertan focus. She became intrigued by the financial opportunities offered in the burgeoning film industry and began to write scenarios, or early screenplays, for silent films. After receiving her first credit from Universal Studios in 1921 for the scenario for the silent film False Kisses, she left Calgary in 1924 to work at Universal's New York City offices. The following year, Universal tapped her to lead their scenario department in Hollywood, California. She also ghost-wrote scripts for Metro-Goldwyn-Mayer. She is credited on six films, all produced by Universal; her work on many others remains uncredited.

Eaton's publications, including all her novels, have been collected in the Winnifred Eaton Archive.

== Partial bibliography ==
- His Royal Nibs (1925)
- Cattle (1923)
- Sunny-San (1922)
- Marion: The Story of an Artist's Model (1916); reprint edition edited by Karen E. H. Skinazi (2012)
- Me: A Book of Remembrance (1915); reprint edition edited by Linda Trinh Moser (1997)
- Chinese-Japanese Cook Book (with Sara Eaton Bosse, 1914)
- The Honorable Miss Moonlight (1912)
- Tama (1910)
- The Diary of Delia (1907)
- A Japanese Blossom (1906)
- The Love of Azalea (1904)
- Daughters of Nijo (1904)
- The Heart of Hyacinth (1903); reprint edition edited by Samina Najmi (2000)
- The Wooing of Wistaria (1902)
- A Japanese Nightingale (1901); reprint edition (published with Madame Butterfly, by John Luther Long) edited by Jean Lee Cole and Maureen Honey (2002)
- Miss Numè of Japan (1899); reprint edition edited by Eve Oishi (1999)

== Selected filmography ==
- East Is West (1930)
- Young Desire (1930)
- Undertow (1930)
- Shanghai Lady (1929)
- The Mississippi Gambler (1929)
- False Kisses (1921)

== See also ==
- List of Asian American writers
- List of women writers
