= Leaves from the Mental Portfolio of an Eurasian =

1909 memoir by Sui Sin Far

- Author: Sui Sin Far
- Language: English
- Genre: Memoir
- Publication date: 1909

Leaves from the Mental Portfolio of an Eurasian is a short autobiographical memoir by Sui Sin Far, pen name of Chinese British Canadian American writer Edith Maude Eaton. Published in 1909, the account describes Far’s experiences with racism, including anecdotes stretching back to 1869, as a multiracial white and Chinese American woman in America.

== Summary ==
The story follows writer Sui Sin Far as she grows up, beginning with her childhood, including her earliest memories of others’ reactions to learning that she is Chinese. These experiences lead her to realize how differently she is viewed from other children. In one memory, Far is playing with a white child when a nearby girl tells the white child not to play with Far because her mother is Chinese. Although Far’s playmate is still willing to play despite her heritage, Far feels hurt and refuses. In another memory, Far is at a children's party when an adult summons her to inspect her features and comment on which ones are Chinese and which are European, leading her to hide for the rest of the party.

After moving to Hudson City, New York, Far and her brother come across Chinese people outside of their family for the first time. At first, Far is surprised to find their manner of dress unusual. However, when a group of white children subsequently attack Far and her brother for their race, she overcomes these initial thoughts and declares that she is proud to be Chinese.

In Eastern Canada, Far continues to face racism and attacks from white children and adults. She overhears comments from strangers who witness her family, encounters threats of violence, and faces questions about her home life and cultural habits. Throughout her childhood and teenage years, Far remains troubled by the racism that she faces, and she experiences internal conflict over her multiracial identity. After frequently visiting the library and educating herself on China, she gains confidence and pride in her heritage and is bothered not by her ethnicity, but by others’ prejudice.

When working as a journalist on local papers, Far’s assignments include most of the reporting on the local Chinese community, and she uses this opportunity to defend her fellow Chinese Americans. Through her reporting, she meets a variety of Chinese individuals in the area, including those who are multiracial. Although Far faces a lack of acceptance from some Chinese Americans because she is multiracial, she remains optimistic for the future of multiracial Asian Americans.

While Far is living in a small midwest town, her employer and coworkers begin making derogatory and dehumanizing comments about Chinese people, unaware of Far’s Chinese heritage. When she reveals that she is Chinese, her employer immediately apologizes and realizes his ignorance. However, the truth about Far’s ethnicity spreads to the rest of the town, so she must leave to avoid the subsequent prejudice.

Far becomes a journalist in San Francisco and is delegated to obtain newspaper subscriptions from Chinatown residents. However, some members of the community mistake her for white and regard her with suspicion, and some do not believe that she is Chinese even when she tells them her ethnicity. She nevertheless finds that once she gets to know these members of the community better, many are accepting.

After meeting various people throughout her career, Far recounts stories from two multiracial Chinese American women. One of them hid her ethnicity from her husband but was treated with acceptance once she told him. The other disliked her fiancé from the beginning and only agreed to marry him after constant pestering, but she finally left him after he became uncomfortable with her association with other Chinese people and asked her to falsely claim that she was Japanese.

To conclude her memoir, Far explains that she remains sincere in her writing despite pressure to pursue literary fame by subscribing to Chinese stereotypes. She describes her multiple identities as someone attached to both the East and West, and she embraces both China and America.
