= Emma Whitcomb Babcock =

American litterateur and author (1849–1926)

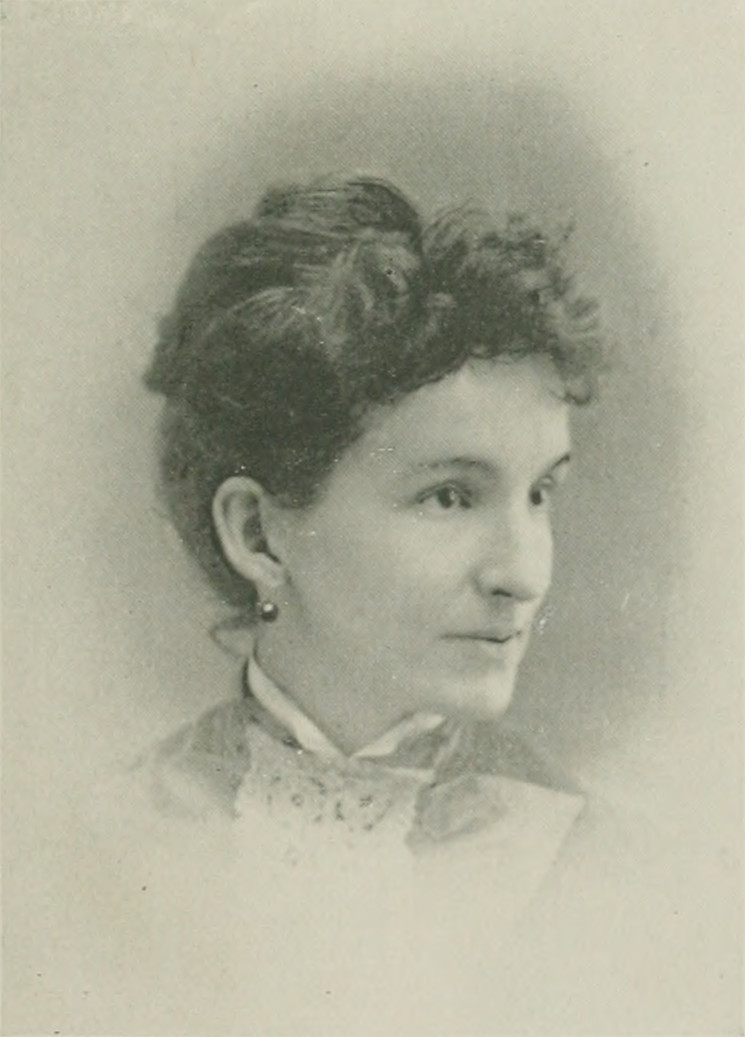
- Photo in A Woman of the Century
- Born: Emma Whitcomb; April 24, 1849; Adams, New York, U.S.
- Died: 1926 (aged 76–77)
- Occupations: litterateur, author
- Spouse: Charles Almanzo Babcock
- Relatives: Winnifred Eaton, daughter-in-law
- Writing career
- Notable work: Household Hints

Emma Whitcomb Babcock (née, Whitcomb; April 24, 1849 – 1926) was an American litterateur. She did considerable work as a book reviewer, and contributed to various leading magazines. She was the author of Household Hints, a domestic management guide, and A Mother's Note Book, as well as other works. Babcock was president of The Belles-Lettres club, well known in western Pennsylvania, which founded a public library.

== Early life ==
Emma Whitcomb was born in Adams, New York, April 24, 1849. She was the daughter of Henry Holley Whitcomb and Judith Maria Mooney Whitcomb.

== Career ==
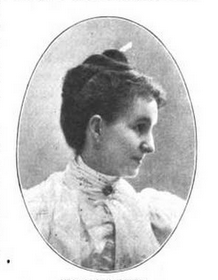
Emma Whitcomb Babcock

As a writer, Babcock contributed to journals and magazines. Also a book-reviewer, she was probably best known through her series of unsized articles which during five years appeared in the New York City "Evening Post." She was a contributor to the first number of "Babyhood" and also of the "Cosmopolitan." She published "Household Hints" (1890), and later, "A Mother's Note Book." She conducted a department in the Homemaker. Babcock wrote a novel, which embodied many distinctive features of the oil country. Her husband's profession turned her attention to educational subjects, and she published many articles in the technical journals on those subjects. She was interested in home mission work and was president of a literary club which was known throughout western Pennsylvania, and which founded a public library. She died in 1926 and is buried in Adams Rural Cemetery, Adams, New York.

=== Household Hints ===
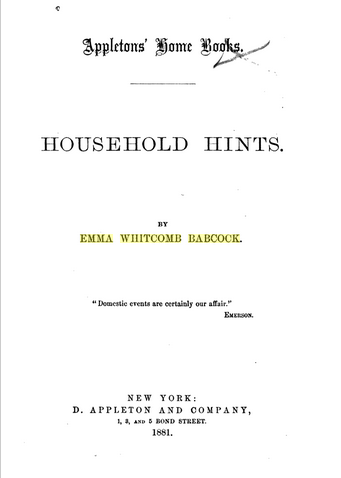
Household Hints

The Philadelphia North American reviewed Household Hints, saying “Not only the young wife who is just setting out on her housekeeping career, but even the experienced matron, may obtain much useful information and many valuable hints from Mrs. Babcock's readable little book. It is evidently written by a lady who has rather more than her fair share of common sense and good judgment, and moreover had the additional advantage of extended experience. Mrs. Babcock of course furnishes a number of culinary receipts, but her advice takes, a wide range, and embraces all the various phases of housekeeping, including the management of children.”

=== The Belles-Lettres club ===
The Belles-Lettres Club was the first to conduct (with financial success) a course of lectures in Oil City, Pennsylvania, and was one of the first in Pennsylvania to join the General Federation of Women's Clubs. The motto of the General Federation, 'Unity in Diversity,' was the prevalent spirit of the club. Babcock, widely known for her literary and executive abilities, was the president from the start. In 1892, the club was incorporated for "the study of literature, and the establishing and maintaining of a public library." The incorporators were, Babcock, Emma Simpson Hulings, Elizabeth Cowell, Rebecca M. Parker, Laura M. Wise, Jean M. Hyde, Sarah Delphine Crozier, Rebecca Clark, Jennie Barr, Lavinia K. Hartwell, Elizabeth L. Brundred, Clara L. Hartwell. The meetings were weekly, and the literary work was excellent. The literary courses she outlined upon special subjects were in frequent demand by other clubs.

== Personal life ==
She became a resident of Oil City, in which town her husband, Charles Almanzo Babcock, was superintendent of schools. Their son, Bertrand Whitcomb Babcock, married the writer, Winnifred Eaton. Emma Whitcomb Babcock died in 1926.
