= Roscoe Lloyd Babcock =

American painter

Roscoe Lloyd Babcock (November 14, 1897 – June 11, 1981) was an American painter. Babcock was born in Thayer, Kansas and was based in California.

Babcock was raised on a farm. He moved to Colorado in 1912 and worked as a cowboy. Later he was inducted into the United States Army during World War I, and served as a private. After the war, he attended the School of Mines at Golden, Colorado and then studied at the PAFA. He settled in Laguna Beach, California in 1920 and furthered his art studies with Galen Doss, Thelma Paddock Hope, and Clyde Scott.

During his job at the United States Postal Service, he painted in his leisure time. He is known as "The Painting Postman of LA". Babcock died in Huntington Beach, CA on June 11, 1981 and he and his wife, Hazel Ethlyn, and son, Lloyd R. Babcock, are buried in Fairhaven Memorial Park, Santa Ana, Orange County, CA.

His biography appeared in Who's Who in American Art, the source for most of the biographical information in this article, and he is mentioned in Davenports' Art Reference and Price Guide, Hughes Artists in California, Artists of the West, and Artists' Bluebook.
