= Smithsonian Migratory Bird Center =

Research center and part of the Smithsonian Institution's National Zoological Park

The Smithsonian Migratory Bird Center is a research program dedicated to fostering greater understanding, appreciation, and protection of bird migration. It is located at the Smithsonian's National Zoo in Washington, D.C.

== History ==
This Smithsonian Institution research program was founded with Congressional support in 1991, and was incorporated in 1997 as part of the National Zoological Park. It came under the Smithsonian Conservation Biology Institute, established in 2010. Its founding director was ornithologist Dr. Russell Greenberg.

From an initial focus on the conservation biology of Neotropical songbirds, it now researches the role of disease in population declines in migratory birds, environmental challenges facing urban and suburban birds and their adaptation to changes in natural and anthropogenic habitats and climate, and the conservation biology of wetland birds. Their research group has long-term research programs dealing with migratory birds in both their breeding and non-breeding areas, with studies of how specific breeding and non-breeding populations are connected by migration.

The center is led by wildlife biologist Scott Sillett.

== Programs ==
In 1998, it developed the Bird Friendly coffee program that fosters management practices at coffee farms that are good for birds while remaining marketable. Coffee grown under the program is certified as either agroforestry or Forest Conservation. The former requires at minimum 40% tree shade cover, 10 different tree species per hectare, and 60% native trees, certified organic with no deforestation for 10 years, while the latter requires a 2:3 forest to crop ratio, a stable land governance and management plan, and a primary or secondary forest in accordance with forest development, while still being shade grown and organic, with purchases supporting the conservation of migratory birds. The criteria for Bird Friendly certification was developed from basic research on migratory bird-habitat relationships by Smithsonian Migratory Bird Center scientists regarding survival rate at over-wintering habitat in the Neo Tropics, where many coffee farms are found.

The center sponsors advanced undergraduate and graduate students at collaborating institutions, as well as in-house post-doctoral fellowships. The center's education efforts include the creation of International Migratory Bird Day, a holiday which is celebrated on the second Saturday of May in the United States and Canada, and on the second Saturday of October in most of Latin America.

Neighborhood Nestwatch is the center's community-based science and educational outreach program where volunteers monitor the reproductive success and survival of birds in their communities.

Its Bridging the Americas/Unidos por las Aves program is an education program that partners elementary school classes in the Washington, D.C. area with classes in Latin America and the Caribbean. The goals of the program are:

1. To teach students about the migratory birds that connect these two regions of the hemisphere and the need to protect their habitats
2. To stimulate an interest in learning about other countries and their cultures

Since 1993, over 17,000 students in grades third through eighth from 11 countries of the Americas have participated.
