= Charles L. Babcock =

American attorney (born 1949)

Charles L. "Chip" Babcock
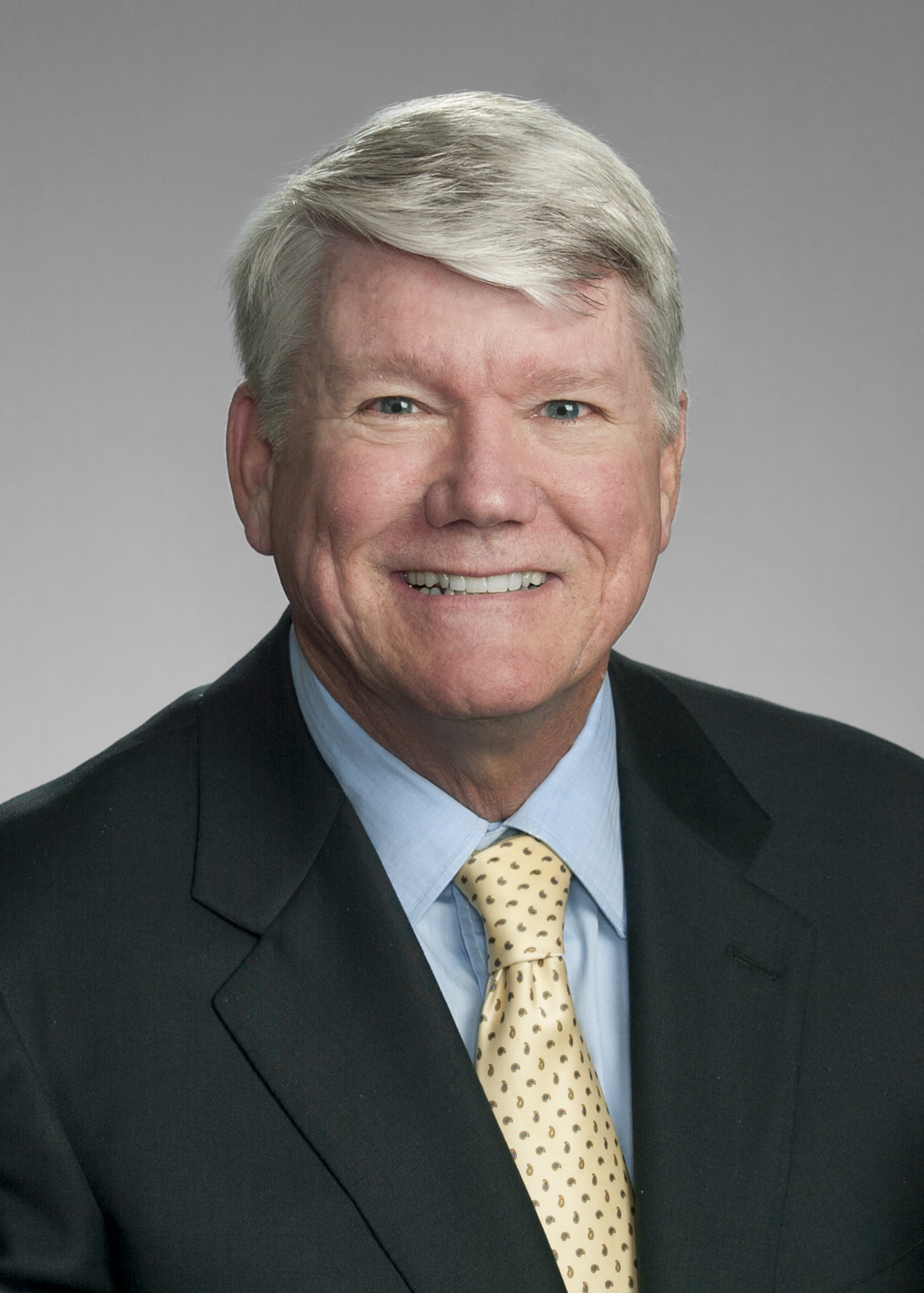
- Born: 23 June 1949 (age 77); Brooklyn, New York
- Education: AB Brown University 1971; JD Boston University 1976
- Occupation: Attorney
- Employer: Jackson Walker LLP
- Known for: Serving as lead litigator for Oprah Winfrey

Charles L. "Chip" Babcock (born 23 June 1949) is an American attorney with the Texas-based law firm Jackson Walker L.L.P. He is best known for serving as lead litigator for Oprah Winfrey in several cases, including a 1998 lawsuit regarding an episode of The Oprah Winfrey Show about mad cow disease. He is a graduate of Brown University and the Boston University School of Law.

== Education ==
Babcock attended Brown University where he earned an AB in 1971. He went on to earn a JD from the Boston University School of Law in 1976. While at Boston University, Babcock served as the executive editor of the Boston University Law Review. He was admitted to the State Bar of Texas in 1977.

== Professional career ==
=== Early career ===
In college, Babcock was the sports director for Brown University radio station WBRU. He then worked as a sports writer for The Philadelphia Inquirer. Following his completion of law school in 1976, Babcock spent two years working for Judge Robert William Porter in the United States District Court for the Northern District of Texas.

=== Jackson Walker L.L.P. ===
After his time with Judge Porter, Babcock joined the Texas-based law firm Jackson Walker L.L.P. Early in Babcock’s career at Jackson Walker, he helped establish a precedent, allowing reporters to protect confidential sources as part of their First Amendment privileges when he defended a reporter in the 1980 case Miller v. Transamerican Press Inc.

In 1998, Babcock served as the lead attorney for Oprah Winfrey, successfully defending her when she was sued by a group of cattlemen from Amarillo, Texas who believed that an episode of her show about mad cow disease violated the False Disparagement of Perishable Food Products Act. Babcock also represented Oprah in 2002. Following his initial work with Oprah, Babcock successfully defended Amway in a 1999 civil lawsuit filed by Procter & Gamble alleging that Amway violated the Racketeer Influenced and Corrupt Organizations Act.

From 2003 to 2009, Babcock represented the Providence, Rhode Island–based television station WPRI and their videographer, when they were sued for wrongful death and injury after allegedly obstructing exits during a Rhode Island nightclub fire. Babcock also represented The Dallas Morning News in a 2004 defamation lawsuit initiated by restaurant mogul Phil Romano.

In 2007, Babcock’s representation of Texas Supreme Court Justice Nathan Hecht received complaints from the advocacy group Texas Watch, who alleged that Jackson Walker had given Hecht a discount on legal fees which constituted an illegal campaign donation. The Texas Ethics Commission found the discount to be a campaign contribution and fined Judge Hecht $29,000.

In 2012, Babcock served as a lead council for Celanese Corporation and successfully defended the corporation in a lawsuit initiated by Southern Chemical Corporation who sought $1.1 billion in fraud damages and $92 million for breach of contract. The following year Babcock represented Peteski Productions Inc. when they sued Gawker Media for copyright infringement, alleging that their website Deadspin published video from the Dr. Phil Show before it aired.

Other notable clients Babcock has represented include Judge Sharon Keller, Diane Sawyer, Warren Buffett, Bill O’Reilly, George W. Bush, and Google, who Babcock is representing in an appeal to a 2012 expunction order issued by a Galveston County District Court.

== Awards and honors ==
In September 1999 Babcock was appointed the chairman of the Texas Supreme Court Advisory Committee. In addition, Babcock is a fellow of the American College of Trial Lawyers, the International Academy of Trial Lawyers, and the Litigation Counsel of America. He has been named a Texas Super Lawyer by Super Lawyers magazine from 2003 to 2013, and was listed in D Magazine as one of the Best Lawyers in Dallas in 2009, 2011, and 2012. Babcock was also listed as one of America's Leading Lawyers for Business by Chambers & Partners and profiled by Texas Lawyer Magazine as one of the 25 Greatest Texas Lawyers of the Past Quarter-Century. In 2026, Babcock was listed as one of Law Dragon's top Leading Global Entertainment, Sports & Media Lawyers.
