= Charlie Babcock =

American actor (born 1979)

Charlie Babcock (né Charles William Babcock; 1979, Grosse Pointe, Michigan) is an American actor. He guest-starred on several television programs which include a recurring role on the ABC series Desperate Housewives. Other guest star appearances include 8 Simple Rules and Cold Case. He is also known for parts in Special (2006), RewinD (2005) and Spoonaur (2004).
