= BirdsCaribbean =

Non-profit ornithological organization

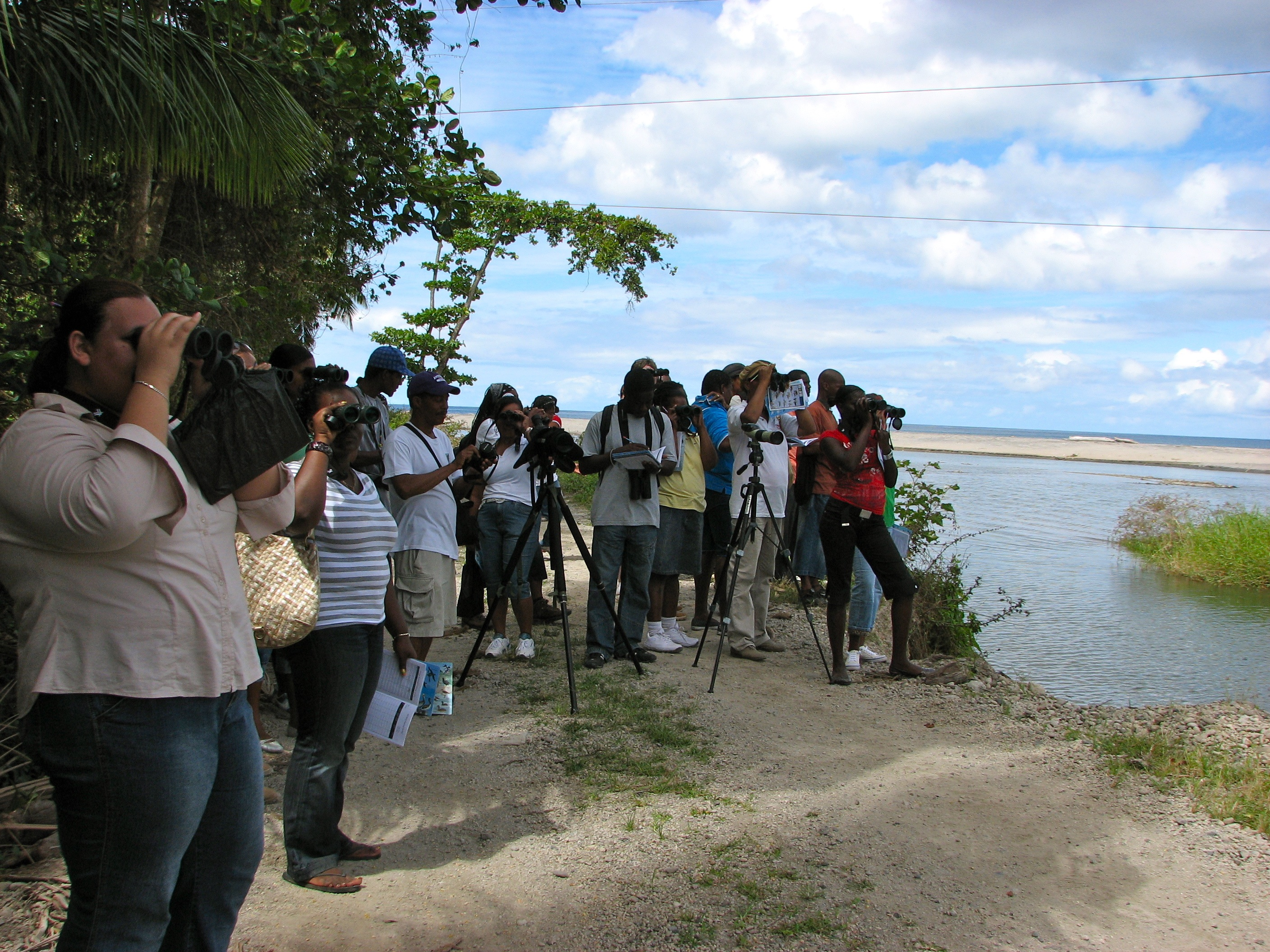
BirdsCaribbean birding trip

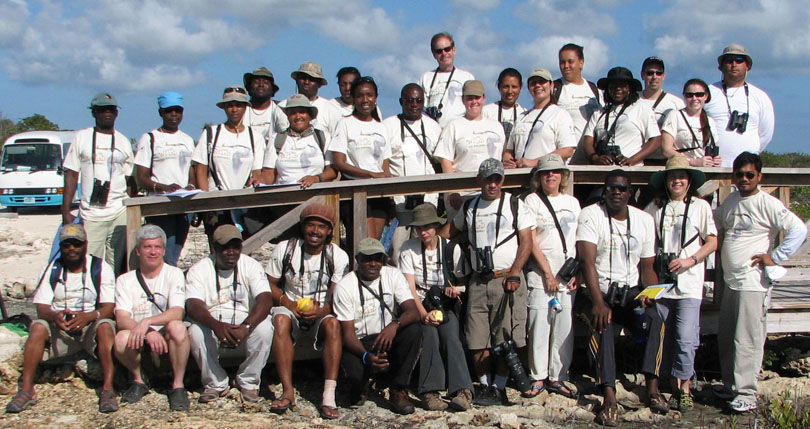
Participants at the 2011 Waterbird and Wetland Monitoring Training Workshop put on by the organization

Birds Caribbean, formerly the Society for the Conservation and Study of Caribbean Birds (SCSCB), is an ornithological non-profit organization. Founded in 1988, the organization strives to protect Caribbean birds and their habitats through education, research, conservation action and capacity building. It is the largest bird conservation organization in the Caribbean region, including the Bahamas and Bermuda as well as the islands within the Caribbean basin.

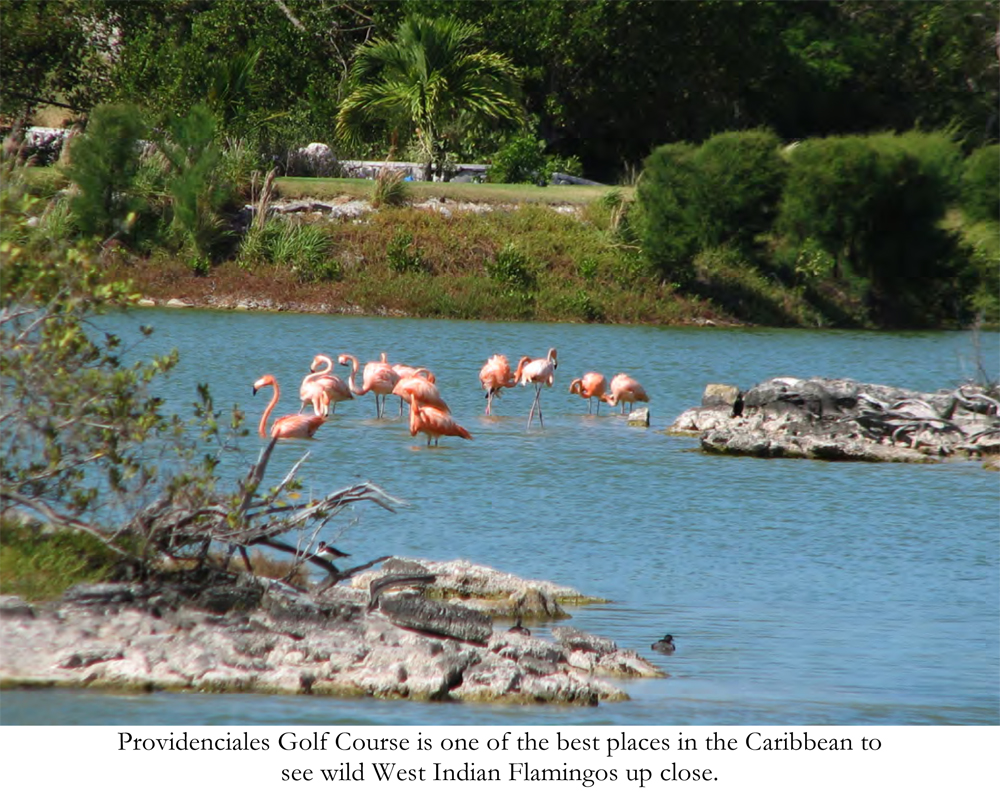
West Indian flamingoes (Phoenicopterus ruber) from a report by the organization

BirdsCaribbean produces the scientific, peer-reviewed publication Journal of Caribbean Ornithology (formerly El Pitirre) which publishes ornithological papers in English, French, and Spanish.

== Caribbean Endemic Bird Festival (CEBF) ==
working to increase awareness and appreciation of the region’s unique bird life through an annual Caribbean Endemic Bird Festival (CEBF). BirdsCaribbean has hosted this festival for 20 years. The month-long celebration includes Caribbean-wide activities beginning on Earth Day (April 22), through to International Biodiversity Day (May 22), in more than twenty countries. The event celebrates the 171 bird species that are found only in the Caribbean, known as endemics. The highly successful program attracts over 100,000 participants and volunteers each year.
