= Charles Almanzo Babcock =

Educator and founder of Bird Day (c. 1847–1922)

- Born: 1847
- Died: 1922 (aged 74–75)
- Occupations: educator, superintendent of schools in Oil City, Pennsylvania
- Known for: founder of Bird Day
- Spouse: Emma Whitcomb Babcock

Charles Almanzo Babcock (1847–1922) was a late-nineteenth-century superintendent of schools in Oil City, Pennsylvania. He is credited with launching Bird Day, a day to celebrate birds in American schools, on May 4. The first Bird Day was celebrated in Oil City schools in 1894, and by 1901 the practice was well established. His wife was the author Emma Whitcomb Babcock.

== Works ==
- Suggestions for Bird-Day Programs in Bird-Lore, Vol. I, (1899)
- Bird Day; How to prepare for it at Project Gutenberg, (1901)
