= Chinglish (play) =

Play by David Henry Hwang

- Original Broadway poster
- Original language: English, Mandarin
- Written by: David Henry Hwang
- Genre: Comedy

Premiere
- Date: June 18, 2011
- Place: Goodman Theatre; Chicago, Illinois
- Directed by: Leigh Silverman
- Official website

Chinglish is a play by Tony Award winner David Henry Hwang. It is a comedy about an American businessman desperate to launch a new enterprise in China, which opened on Broadway in 2011 with direction by Leigh Silverman.

== Production history ==
Chinglish premiered at the Goodman Theatre in Chicago, Illinois, where it ran from June 18, 2011, until July 31, 2011. This was Hwang's second collaboration with director Leigh Silverman, following Yellow Face at the Center Theater Group and The Public Theater.

Few plays in recent years have delighted me as much as Chinglish. With a career spanning more than three decades and a canon that incorporates an array of genres, David is one of the luminaries of contemporary American theater. I have admired his work since long before our collaboration on the Broadway musical Aida, and it is a thrill to welcome him to the Goodman for the first time.

-Robert Falls, Goodman Theatre Artistic Director

The play premiered on Broadway at the Longacre Theatre on October 11, 2011 (previews), officially on October 27, 2011. Directed by Leigh Silverman, the cast featured Gary Wilmes, Jennifer Lim, Angela Lin, Christine Lin, Stephen Pucci, Johnny Wu and Larry Lei Zhang. The play was performed in English and Mandarin (with projected English supertitles). The sets were by David Korins, costumes by Anita Yavich, lighting by Brian MacDevitt, sound by Darron L. West and projections by Jeff Sugg and Shawn Duan.

== Plot ==
Jennifer Lim and Gary Wilmes

An American businessman arrives in a bustling Chinese province looking to score a lucrative contract for his family's sign-making firm. He soon finds that the complexities of such a venture far outstrip the expected differences in language, customs and manners – and calls into questions even the most basic assumptions of human conduct.

The U.S. and China are at a critical moment in history—each nation is deeply interested in, but knows very little about the other. Chinglish was born from the many visits I’ve made to China over the past five or six years to witness the exciting changes there. During one visit, I toured a new arts center where everything was first-rate—except for the ridiculously translated English signs. It was at that moment I thought of writing this play."

-David Henry Hwang, Playwright

== Characters and Broadway cast ==
Source: Internet Broadway Database

- Daniel Cavanaugh (丹尼尔．卡凡諾; 丹尼爾．卡凡諾; Dānní'ěr Kǎfánnuò) - Gary Wilmes
- Xi Yan (席 言; Xí Yán) - Jennifer Lim
- Miss Qian (钱小姐; 錢小姐; Qián-xiǎojie) / Prosecutor Li (李检察官; 李檢察官; Lǐ-jiǎncháguān) - Angela Lin
- Miss Zhao (赵女士; 趙女士; Zhào-nǚshì) - Christine Lin
- Peter Timms (彼得; Bǐdé) - Stephen Pucci
- Bing (冰; Bīng) / Judge Xu Geming (许革命法官; 許革命法官; Xǔ Gémìng-fǎguān) - Johnny Wu
- Minister Cai Guoliang (蔡国亮局长; 蔡國亮局長; Cài Guóliàng-júzhǎng) - Larry Lei Zhang

== Notable productions ==
=== Berkeley Repertory Theater, South Coast Repertory and Hong Kong Arts Festival cast ===
- Daniel Cavanaugh - Alex Moggridge
- Xi Yan - Michelle Krusiec
- Miss Qian / Prosecutor Li - Celeste Den
- Miss Zhao - Vivian Chiu
- Peter Timms - Brian Nishii
- Bing / Judge Xu Geming - Austin Ku
- Minister Cai Guoliang - Larry Lei Zhang (Berkeley) / Raymond Ma (South Coast Repertory)

=== Portland Center Stage, Syracuse stage cast ===
- Daniel Cavanaugh - Peter O'Connor
- Xi Yan - Tina Chilip
- Hotel Manager/Prosecutor Li - Lily Tung Crystal
- Peter Timms - Jeff Locker
- Miss Qian / Miss Zhao - Rachel Lu
- Bing / Judge Xu Geming - Yuekun Wu
- Minister Cai Guoliang - Jian Xin

=== East West Players, Los Angeles Cast (September/October & December 2015) ===
- Daniel Cavanaugh - Matthew Jaeger
- Xi Yan - Kara Wang
- Peter Timms - Jeff Locker
- Minister Cai Guoliang - Ben Wang
- Miss Qian / Prosecutor Li - Leann Lei
- Bing / Judge Xu Geming - Ewan Chung
- Miss Zhao - Joy Yao

Directed by Jeff Liu

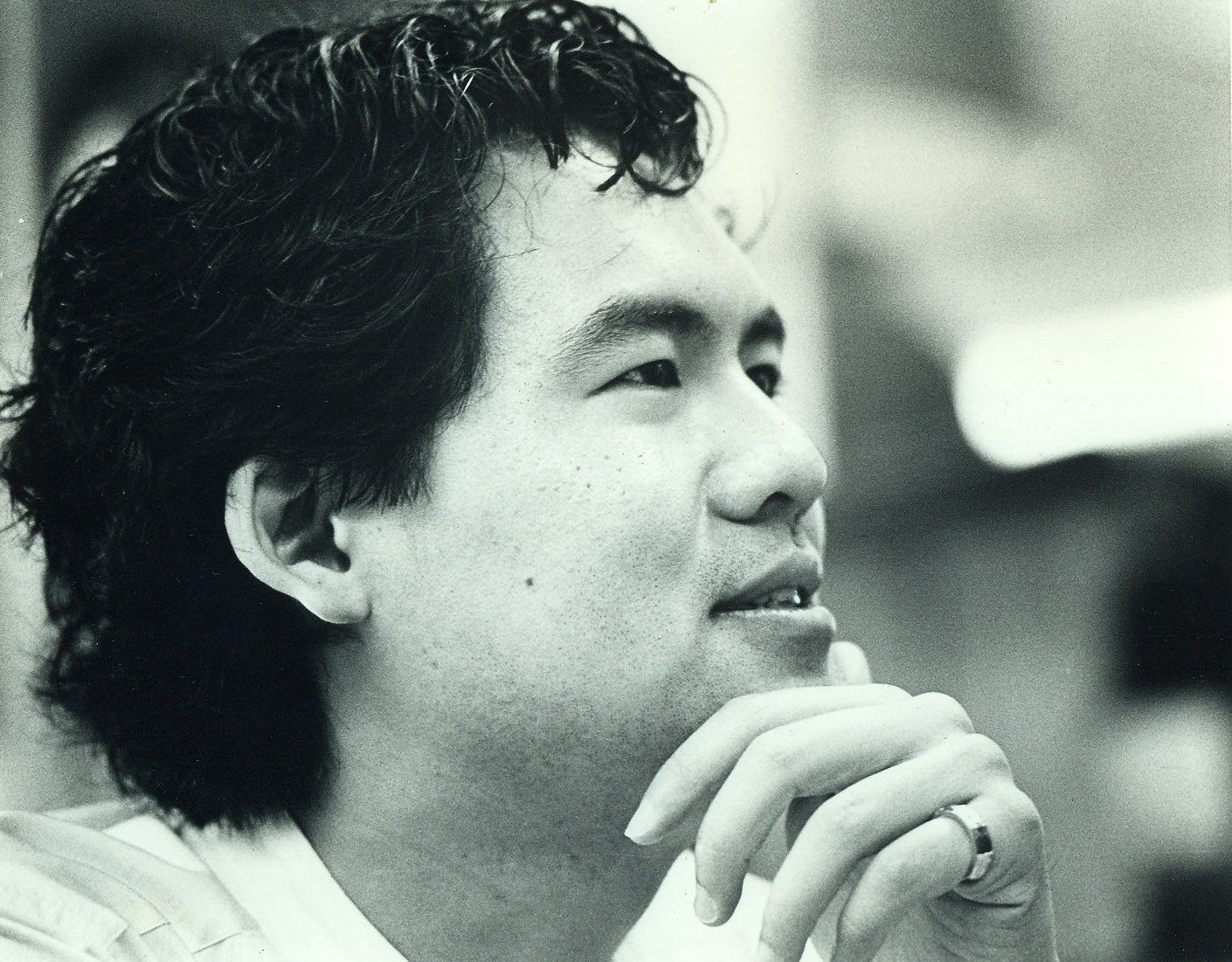
Playwright David Henry Hwang

== Critical reception ==
The production earned glowing praise from the Chicago Tribune, which wrote: "Four stars! In Hwang's hilarious Chinglish, the Chinese tiger roars, American business trembles. Laughs and sexual pleasure in translation. A shrewd, timely and razor sharp comedy! David Henry Hwang's best work since M. Butterfly. The Chicago Sun-Times judged the piece "One of the funniest plays in memory. ... Chinglish has characters not clichés - the Chinese aren't worker bees, the American isn't an arrogant idiot.

The New York staging was called: "Fresh, energetic and unlike anything else on Broadway. Chinglish is a thoughtful, funny and poignant piece in which, miraculously, nothing gets lost in translation." Bloomberg termed it "A lethal comedy about business, sex and the failure to communicate that bristles with intelligence." Time magazine ranked the play as its #3 choice among all theatre productions in 2011.

Of the Los Angeles show, the Los Angeles Times dubbed Chinglish a Critic's Choice and said: "This production surpasses the South Coast Repertory-Berkeley Repertory production – itself no slouch...It’s taken a long time for this 2011 play to reach L.A., but thank goodness it got here in such excellent shape. (The Chinese-screen set, the costumes and lights are wonderful too, and East West [Players] has taken particular care with the Mandarin; each of its speakers was either born in China or immersed in the language.)."

== Awards and nominations ==
The Chicago production was nominated for five Joseph Jefferson Awards:

- Best Production - Chinglish
- Director - Leigh Silverman
- Actress in a Principal Role - Jennifer Lim
- New Work - David Henry Hwang - (WON)
- Scenic Design - David Korins - (WON)

The Broadway production was nominated for three Drama Desk Awards:

- 2012 Outstanding Play
- 2012 Outstanding Actress in a Play (Jennifer Lim)
- 2012 Outstanding Set Design (David Korins)
