= Theater Mu =

Theater Mu, (Formerly Mu Performing Arts), located in Saint Paul, Minnesota, is an Asian American arts organization in the Midwest, the second largest in the country. According to Mu's website, the company name "Mu" is "the Korean pronunciation of the Chinese character Mu for the shaman-artist-warrior who connects the heavens and the earth through the tree of life."

Theater Mu was founded in 1992 by playwright, director, and taiko artist Rick Shiomi, along with Dong-il Lee, Diane Espaldon, and Martha Johnson. Six years later, the organization changed its name to Mu Performing Arts after starting a taiko drumming program known as Mu Daiko.

Shiomi served as Artistic Director for 21 years, stepping down in 2013. Randy Reyes took over as Artistic Director, and was subsequently fired by the Mu Board in 2018. Organizational changes occurred in 2017 as Mu Daiko transitioned to become a separate non-profit arts organization, TaikoArts Midwest, and Mu reverted to its original name of Theater Mu. After Reyes was let go, the position was assumed by Lily Tung Crystal in 2019. In 2025, Tung Crystal began a new position with East West Players in California, and Fran de Leon assumed the role of Artistic Director.

Since its inception in 1993, Theater Mu's New Eyes Festival has been an annual tradition featuring staged readings of new works, and continues to the theater's longest running program. Mu's productions have included world premieres of new works by Leah Nanako Winkler and local playwright May Lee-Yang, re-imagined productions of Shakespeare and Sondheim musicals, and collaborations with other theaters such as Mixed Blood Theatre Company, Jungle Theater, Penumbra Theatre Company, Park Square Theatre and Guthrie Theater to bring plays by award-winning playwrights such as David Henry Hwang, Carla Ching, and Lauren Yee.

Theater Mu is a founding member of the Consortium of Asian American Theaters & Artists and is a member of the Minnesota Theater Alliance, Americans for the Arts, and Theatre Communications Group. Mu is also a member of the Twin Cities Theatres of Color Coalition standing alongside New Native Theatre, Pangea World Theater, Penumbra Theatre, and Teatro Del Pueblo.
