= East West Players =

Asian-American theatre company

- Formation: 1965; 61 years ago
- Type: Theatre group
- Purpose: Asian American theatre
- Location(s): Union Center for the Arts 120 Judge John Aiso St. Little Tokyo, Los Angeles, California 90012
- Artistic directors: Lily Tung Crystal (2024–present); Snehal Desai (2016–2023); Tim Dang (1993–2016); Nobu McCarthy (1989–1993); Mako (1965–1989)
- Website: eastwestplayers.org

East West Players is an Asian American theatre organization in Los Angeles, founded in 1965. As the nation's first and largest professional Asian American theatre organization, it has since produced works and educational programs centered around the Asian Pacific American experience.

== History ==
Established in 1965 by Mako, Rae Creevey, Beulah Quo, Soon-tek Oh, James Hong, Pat Li, June Kim, Guy Lee, and Yet Lock, East West Players originated as a place where Asian-American actors could perform roles beyond the stereotypical caricatures they were being limited to in Hollywood. Mako served as its first artistic director, working for decades to train and nurture several generations of playwrights and actors. An early statement of purpose read: "To further cultural understanding between the East and West by employing the dual Oriental and American heritages of the East-West Players."

In 1998, EWP Producing Artistic Director Tim Dang led the company’s move from a 99-seat Equity Waiver "black box" into a new 240-seat venue at an Actors' Equity Association contract level. EWP's mainstage is the David Henry Hwang Theater, housed within the historic Union Center for the Arts in downtown Los Angeles’ Little Tokyo district. The theater serves over 15,000 people each year, including low-income audiences of whom are provided free and discounted admissions, as well as deaf audiences via ASL-interpreted productions.

In 2012, The New York Times called East West Players "the nation’s pre-eminent Asian American theater troupe" for their award-winning productions blending Eastern and Western movement, costumes, language, and music. Since its founding, EWP has premiered over 200 plays and musicals about the Asian Pacific American experience and has facilitated over 1,000 readings and workshops. EWP additionally hosts an annual awards dinner to celebrate the achievements of individuals who have "raised the visibility of the Asian Pacific American (APA) community through their craft."

== Mission ==
As of 2019, the East West Players mission statement currently reads: "As the nation's premier Asian American theatre organization, East West Players produces artistic works and educational programs that foster dialogue exploring Asian Pacific experiences." Its goals include:

- Continuing the movement to develop, foster and expand Asian Pacific performance into a major force on the national arts scene in the 21st century
- National recognition of the organization's productions and programs
- Increased opportunities for Asian and Pacific Islander artists on stage and in other media
- Introducing audiences to the diverse Asian Pacific experiences
- Educational programs and mentorship in the literary, technical and performing arts
- Financial and organizational sustainability and growth

== Educational programs ==
East West Players offers a growing array of educational programs training over 200 multicultural artists each year:

- The Actors Conservatory: performance workshops and an intensive Summer Conservatory
- David Henry Hwang Writers Institute: a playwright development program facilitated vis-à-vis writing classes
- Theatre for Youth: a touring program reaching an estimated 50,000 K-8 graders and their families via in-school performances and festivals, with scholarships provided for accessibility

== Alumni ==
Over seventy-five percent of all Asian Pacific performers in the acting unions living in Los Angeles have worked at East West Players. It has additionally provided training and opportunities to many emerging and professional artists who have gone on to win Tony Awards, Obie Awards, Emmy Awards, LA Stage Alliance Ovation Awards, and Academy Awards. East West Players has also collaborated with many organizations though its history, including Center Theatre Group, Pasadena Playhouse, Robey Theatre Company, Cornerstone Theater Company, Ma-Yi Theatre Company, and Cedar Grove OnStage.

Notable EWP alumni include the following.

=== Actors ===
- Mako
- Nobu McCarthy
- Pat Morita
- James Hong
- Yuki Shimoda
- John Lone
- Rodney Kageyama,
- BD Wong
- James Saito
- Freda Foh Shen
- Lauren Tom
- Amy Hill
- Alec Mapa
- Alan Muraoka
- Emily Kuroda
- Sala Iwamatsu
- Chris Tashima
- Anthony Begonia
- John Cho
- Kal Penn
- Daniel Dae Kim
- Matthew Yang King
- Parvesh Cheena
- James Kyson-Lee
- Masi Oka
- Francois Chau
- Jeanne Sakata
- Rachna Khatau
- Greg Watanabe
- Dante Basco

=== Dramatists ===
- Wakako Yamauchi
- Hiroshi Kashiwagi
- David Henry Hwang
- Philip Kan Gotanda
- Roberta Uno
- R.A. Shiomi
- Judith Nihei
- Soji Kashiwagi
- Clyde Kusatsu

=== Collaborations ===
East West Players has also had the opportunity to work with many respected artists and faculty such as actors Dennis Dun, Danny Glover, Bill Macy, Takayo Fischer, George Takei, Tsai Chin, and Nancy Kwan; directors Lisa Peterson and Oskar Eustis; musician Dan Kuramoto; and instructors Calvin Remsberg and Fran Bennett.

== Honorees ==
East West Players hosts an annual gala fundraiser in order to honor "individuals [as well as corporations and foundations] who have raised the visibility of the Asian Pacific American (APA) community through their craft." The event itself comprises a formal dinner followed by a silent auction. Proceeds from the event go directly toward funding the theatre's many educational and artistic programs. Additionally, five awards are given each year:

- Visionary Award
- Corporate/Foundation Visionary Award
- Made in American Award
- Breakout Performance Award
- Founders Award

Past honorees include Tia Carrere, John Cho, Tim Dang, Prince Gomolvilas, Amy Hill, Mako, Mike Shinoda, BD Wong, and Michelle Yeoh.

== Previous seasons ==
Season	Production Title	Directed by	Written by	Music by	Choreography by	In Association with
1965-1966, 1st Season	Rashomon		Fay and Michael Kanin, based on short stories by Ryunosuke Akutagawa			
1965-1966, 1st Season	Twilight Crane		Junji Kinoshita			
1965-1966, 1st Season	Lady Aoi		Yukio Mishima			
1967, 2nd Season	Martyrs Can't Go Home		Soon-Teck Oh			
1967, 2nd Season	Camels Were Two-Legged in Peking		Soon-Teck Oh, adapted from a novel by Lao She			
1968, 3rd Season	The Medium		Gian-Carlo Menotti			
1968, 3rd Season	The Substitute, a Kyogen					
1968, 3rd Season	The Servant of Two Masters		Carlo Goldoni			
1968, 3rd Season	The House of Bernarda Alba		Federigo Garcia Lorca			
1969, 4th Season	The Year of the Cock (revue)					
1969, 4th Season	Now You See, Now You Don't		Henry Woon			
1969, 4th Season	Three Kyogens					
1969, 4th Season	The Inspector General		Nikolai Gogol			
1970, 5th Season	Rashomon (revival)		Fay and Michael Kanin, based on short stories by Ryunosuke Akutagawa			
1970, 5th Season	Tondemonai-Never Happen!		Soon-Teck Oh			
1972, 7th Season	Monkey		Ernest Harada, adapted from a Chinese folktale			
1972, 7th Season	Three Kyogens		Leigh Kim, Betty Muramoto, Irvine Paik			
1972, 7th Season	No Place For a Tired Ghost		Mako			
1972, 7th Season	S.P.O.O.S.		Bill Shinkai			
1972, 7th Season	Tales of Juan and Taro		Glenn Johnson and Alberto Isaac			
1973-1974, 8th Season	Enchanted Pumpkins		E.M. Rafn and Sheri Emond			
1973-1974, 8th Season	Transfers and the Rooming House		Conrad Bromberg			
1973-1974, 8th Season	Two Shades of Yellow: Coda		Alberto Isaac			
1973-1974, 8th Season	Two Shades of Yellow: Yellow Is My Favorite Color		Edward Sakamoto			
1973-1974, 8th Season	Pineapple White		Jon Shirota			
1973-1974, 8th Season	The Emperor's Nightingale		Sam Rosen			
1974-1975, 9th Season	Harry Kelly		Harold Heifetz			
1974-1975, 9th Season	In the Jungle of Cities		Bertolt Brecht			
1974-1975, 9th Season	The Year of the Dragon		Frank Chin			
1974-1975, 9th Season	When We Were Young		Momoko Iko			
1975-1976, 10th Season	A Doll's House		Henrik Ibsen			
1975-1976, 10th Season	Revelations as a Tight-Eyed Devil		Bill Shinkai			
1975-1976, 10th Season	S.P.O.O.S. (revival)		Bill Shinkai			
1975-1976, 10th Season	The Chickencoop Chinaman		Frank Chin			
1975-1976, 10th Season	Nobody On My Side of the Family Looks Like That!		Dom Magwili			
1975-1976, 10th Season	Three Sisters		Anton Chekhov			
1975-1976, 10th Season	The Asian American hearings: A Multi-Media Extravaganza					
1976-1977, 11th Season	That's the Way the Fortune Cookie Crumbles		Edward Sakamoto			
1976-1977, 11th Season	And the Soul Shall Dance		Wakako Yamauchi			
1976-1977, 11th Season	Gee Pop		Frank Chin			
1976-1977, 11th Season	Psychechain		Irvin Paik, adapted from a short story by William Wu			
1976-1977, 11th Season	Twelfth Night		William Shakespeare			
1977-1978, 12th Season	Points of Departure		Paul Stephen Lim			
1977-1978, 12th Season	Bunnyhop		Jeffrey Paul Chan			
1977-1978, 12th Season	O-Men: An American Kabuki		Karen Yamashita			
1978-1979, 13th Season	Voices in the Shadows		Edward Sakamoto			
1978-1979, 13th Season	Frogs		Aristophanes			
1978-1979, 13th Season	The Avocado Kid or Zen and the Art of Guacamole		Philip Kan Gotanda			
1978-1979, 13th Season	Princess Charley		Book by Jim Ploss and Norman Cohen, with lyrics by Jim Ploss	Roger Perry		
1978-1979, 13th Season	Pacific Overtures		Book by John Weidman, with additional material by Hugh Wheeler; Lyrics by Stephen Sondheim	Stephen Sondheim		
1979-1980, 14th Season	Pacific Overtures (encore performance)		Book by John Weidman, with additional material by Hugh Wheeler; Lyrics by Stephen Sondheim	Stephen Sondheim		
1979-1980, 14th Season	Stories with Strings & Sticks & Shadows: Lawson		Lawson Inada			
1979-1980, 14th Season	Stories with Strings & Sticks & Shadows: Karasu Taro		Taro Yashima			
1979-1980, 14th Season	Stories with Strings & Sticks & Shadows: The Princess and the Fisherman & Magic Show		Michiko Tagawa			
1979-1980, 14th Season	Hawaii No Ka Oi: Aala Park and Manoa Valley		Edward Sakamoto			
1979-1980, 14th Season	What the Enemy Looks Like		Perry Miyake, Jr.			
1979-1980, 14th Season	Da Kine		Leigh Kim			
1979-1980, 14th Season	Happy End		Lyrics by Bertolt Brecht; original German play by Dorothy Lane; book and lyrics adapted by Michael Reingold	Kurt Weill		
1980-1981, 15th Season	F.O.B.		David Henry Hwang			
1980-1981, 15th Season	Hokusai Sketchbooks		Seiichi Yashiro, translated by Ted T. Takaya			
1980-1981, 15th Season	Godspell		Conceived by John-Michael Tebelak, with lyrics by Stephen Schwartz	Stephen Schwartz		
1980-1981, 15th Season	Not a Through Street		Wakako Yamauchi			
1980-1981, 15th Season	East West Stories					
1980-1981, 15th Season	The Life of the Land		Edward Sakamoto			
1981-1982, 16th Season	Station J		Richard France			
1981-1982, 16th Season	Christmas in Camp		Dom Magwili; conceived by Mako			
1981-1982, 16th Season	12-1-A		Wakako Yamauchi			
1981-1982, 16th Season	Pilgrimage		Edward Sakamoto			
1982-1983, 17th Season	Imperial Valley		Margaret DePriest			
1982-1983, 17th Season	Have You Heard		Soon-Teck Oh, with additional writing by Kwang Lim Kim and Sukman Kim	Yong Mann Kim		
1982-1983, 17th Season	Yamashita		Roger Pulvers			
1982-1983, 17th Season	The Dream of Kitamura		Philip Kan Gotanda			
1982-1983, 17th Season	No Smile For Strangers		Harold Heifetz			
1982-1983, 17th Season	Yellow Fever		R.A. Shiomi			
1983-1984, 18th Season	Live Oak Store		Hiroshi Kashiwagi			
1983-1984, 18th Season	You're on the Tee & Ripples in the Pond		Jon Shirota			
1983-1984, 18th Season	The Grunt Childe		Lawrence O'Sullivan			
1983-1984, 18th Season	Paint Your Face on a Drowning in the River		Craig Kee Strete			
1983-1984, 18th Season	Asaga Kimashita		Velina Hasu Houston			
1983-1984, 18th Season	Visitors From Nagasaki		Perry Miyake, Jr.			
1984-1985, 19th Season	A Song for a Nisei Fisherman		Philip Kan Gotanda			
1984-1985, 19th Season	The Music Lessons		Wakako Yamauchi			
1984-1985, 19th Season	The Threepenny Opera		Bertolt Brecht, with an English adaptation by Marc Blitzstein	Kurt Weill		
1985-1986, 20th Season	Christmas in Camp II		Dom Magwili; conceived by Mako, with additional writing by Mako and Keone Young			
1985-1986, 20th Season	The Memento		Wakako Yamauchi			
1985-1986, 20th Season	Rashomon (revival)		Fay and Michael Kanin, based on short stories by Ryunosuke Akutagawa			
1986-1987, 21st Season	Chikamtsu's Forest		Edward Sakamoto			
1986-1987, 21st Season	The Gambling Den		Akemi Kikumura			
1986-1987, 21st Season	Wong Bow Rides Again		Cherylene Lee			
1986-1987, 21st Season	The Medium (revival)		Gian-Carlo Menotti			
1986-1987, 21st Season	The Zoo Story		Edward Albee			
1986-1987, 21st Season	Hughie		Eugene O'Neill			
1986-1987, 21st Season	Lady of Larkspur Lotion		Tennessee Williams			
1987-1988, 22nd Season	A Chorus Line		Conceived by Michael Bennett; lyrics by Edward Kleben; book by James Kirkwood, Jr. and Nicholas Dante	Marvin Hamlisch		
1987-1988, 22nd Season	Stew Rice		Edward Sakamoto			
1987-1988, 22nd Season	Mother Tongue		Paul Stephen Lim			
1987-1988, 22nd Season	Mishima		Rosanna Yamagiqa Alfaro			
1987-1988, 22nd Season	Where Nobody Belongs		Colin McKay			
1987-1988, 22nd Season	An Afternoon at Willie's Bar		Paul Price			
1988-1989, 23rd Season	The Fantasticks		Words by Tom Jones	Harvey Schmidt		
1988-1989, 23rd Season	Laughter and False Teeth	Robert Ito	Hiroshi Kashiwagi			
1988-1989, 23rd Season	Webster Street Blues		Warren Sumio Kubota			
1988-1989, 23rd Season	Vacancy		Lillian Hara and Dorie Rush Taylor, based on "An Apple, An Orange" by Diane Johnson			
1989-1990, 24th Season	Company		Book by George Furth; Lyrics by Stephen Sondheim	Stephen Sondheim		
1989-1990, 24th Season	The Chairman's Wife		Wakako Yamauchi			
1989-1990, 24th Season	Performance Anxiety		Vernon Takeshita			
1989-1990, 24th Season	Come Back little Sheba		William Inge			
1990-1991, 25th Season	Songs of Harmony		Karen Huie			
1990-1991, 25th Season	Doughball		Perry Miyake, Jr.			
1990-1991, 25th Season	Hedda Gabler		Henrik Ibsen			
1990-1991, 25th Season	Canton Jazz Club		Book by Dom Magwili, lyrics by Tim Dang	Nathan Wang and Joel Iwataki		
1991-1992, 26th Season	Not a Through Street		Wakako Yamauchi			
1991-1992, 26th Season	Uncle Tadao		Rick Shiomi			
1991-1992, 26th Season	Six Characters in Search of an Author		Luigi Pirandello, with translation by Robert Cornthwaite			
1991-1992, 26th Season	Accomplice		Rupert Holmes			
1992-1993, 27th Season	Into the Woods		Book by James Lapine, with lyrics by Stephen Sondheim	Stephen Sondheim		
1992-1993, 27th Season	Fish Head Soup		Philip Kan Gotanda			
1992-1993, 27th Season	The Rising Tide of Color		Vernon Takeshita			
1992-1993, 27th Season	The Dance & Railroad House of Sleeping Beauties		David Henry Hwang			
1993-1994, 28th Season	29 1/2 Dreams, Women Walking Through Walls		Conceived and developed by Nobu McCarthy and Tim Dang; written by Emily Kuroda, Jeanne Sakata, Judy SooHoo, Marilyn Tokuda, and Denise Uyehara			
1993-1994, 28th Season	Arthur and Leila		Cherylene Lee			
1993-1994, 28th Season	The Maids		Jean Genet			
1993-1994, 28th Season	Letters to a Student Revolutionary		Elizabeth Wong			
1994-1995, 29th Season	Hiro		Denise Uyehara			
1994-1995, 29th Season	Sweeney Todd		Book by Hugh Wheeler, with lyrics by Stephen Sondheim	Stephen Sondheim		
1994-1995, 29th Season	Twice Told Christmas Tales		Judy SooHoo			
1994-1995, 29th Season	S.A.M. I Am		Garrett Omata			
1994-1995, 29th Season	Cleveland Raining		Sung J. Rho			
1994-1995, 29th Season	Twelf Nite O Wateva!		James Grant Benton			
1995-1996, 30th Season	Merrily We Roll Along		Book by George Futh, with lyrics by Stephen Sondheim	Stephen Sondheim		
1995-1996, 30th Season	And the Soul Shall Dance		Wakako Yamauchi			
1995-1996, 30th Season	Whitelands: Part I – Porcelain; Part II – A Language Of Their Own; Part III – Half Lives		Chay Yew			
1995-1996, 30th Season	Lettice & Lovage		Peter Shaffer			
1996-1997, 31st Season	Cabaret		Book by Joe Masteroff, with lyrics by Fred Ebb	John Kander		
1996-1997, 31st Season	Ikebana		Alice Tuan			
1996-1997, 31st Season	The Taste of Kona Coffee		Edward Sakamoto			
1996-1997, 31st Season	F.O.B.		David Henry Hwang			
1996-1997, 31st Season	Woman From the Other Side of the World		Linda Faigao-Hall			
1997-1998, 32nd Season	Pacific Overtures		Book by John Weidman, with lyrics by Stephen Sondheim	Stephen Sondheim		
1997-1998, 32nd Season	Heading East		Book and lyrics by Robert Lee	Leon Ko		
1997-1998, 32nd Season	Big Hunk O' Burnin' Love		Prince Gomolvilas			
1997-1998, 32nd Season	Lava		Edward Sakamoto			
1997-1998, 32nd Season	Dance and Sing for the Holidays	Deborah Nishimura	Deborah Nishimura			
1998-1999, 33rd Season	Yohen		Philip Kan Gotanda			
1998-1999, 33rd Season	Carry the Tiger to the Mountain		Cherylene Lee			
1998-1999, 33rd Season	Hanako		Chungmi Kim			
1998-1999, 33rd Season	Beijing Spring		Lyrics by Tim Dang	Joel Iwataki		
1999-2000, 34th Season	Leilani's Hibiscus		Jon Shirota			
1999-2000, 34th Season	Golden Child		David Henry Hwang			
1999-2000, 34th Season	My Tired Broke Ass Pontificating Slapstick Funk		Euijoon Kim			
1999-2000, 34th Season	Follies		Book by James Goldman, with lyrics by Stephen Sondheim	Stephen Sondheim		
2000-2001, 35th Season	The Theory of Everything		Prince Gomolvilas			
2000-2001, 35th Season	The Year of the Dragon		Frank Chin			
2000-2001, 35th Season	A Funny Thing Happened on the Way to the Forum		Book by Burt Shevelove and Larry Gelbart, with lyrics by Stephen Sondheim	Stephen Sondheim		
2000-2001, 35th Season	Yankee Dawg You Die		Philip Kan Gotanda			
2001-2002, 36th Season	Red	Chay Yew	Chay Yew			
2001-2002, 36th Season		Chay Yew	Philip Kan Gotanda			
2001-2002, 36th Season	Monster		Derek Nguyen			
2001-2002, 36th Season	And the World Goes 'Round		Scott Ellis, Susan Stroman, David Thompson, with lyrics by Fred Ebb	John Kander		
2002-2003, 37th Season	Queen of the Remote Control		Sujata G. Bhatt			
2002-2003, 37th Season	The Tempest		William Shakespeare			
2002-2003, 37th Season	Little Shop of Horrors		Book and lyrics by Howard Ashman, based on the film by Roger Corman; screenplay by Charles Griffith	Alan Menken		
2002-2003, 37th Season	The Nisei Widows Club		Betty Tokudani			
2003-2004, 38th Season	Passion		Book by James Lapine, with lyrics by Stephen Sondheim	Stephen Sondheim		
2003-2004, 38th Season	Masha No Home		Lloyd Suh			
2003-2004, 38th Season	The Wind Cries Mary		Philip Kan Gotanda			
2003-2004, 38th Season	M. Butterfly		David Henry Hwang			
2004-2005, 39th Season	Mixed Messages		Cherylene Lee			
2004-2005, 39th Season	As Vishnu Dreams		Shishir Kurup			
2004-2005, 39th Season	Proof		David Auburn			
2004-2005, 39th Season	Imelda: A New Musical		Book by Sachi Oyama, with lyrics by Aaron Coleman	Nathan Wang		
2005-2006, 40th Season	Stew Rice		Edward Sakamoto			
2005-2006, 40th Season	Equus		Peter Schaffer			
2005-2006, 40th Season	Sweeney Todd: The Demon Barber of Fleet Street		Book by Hugh Wheeler, with lyrics by Stephen Sondheim	Stephen Sondheim		
2005-2006, 40th Season	Motty-Chon		Perry Miyake			
2006-2007, 41st Season	Slides: The Fear Is Real...		Mr. Miyagi's Theatre Company			
2006-2007, 41st Season	Surfing DNA		Jodi Long			
2006-2007, 41st Season	Master Class		Terrence McNally			
2006-2007, 41st Season	I Land		Keo Woolford			
2006-2007, 41st Season	Yellow Face		David Henry Hwang			
2007-2008, 42nd Season	Durango		Julia Cho			
2007-2008, 42nd Season	Dawn's Light		Jeanne Sakata			
2007-2008, 42nd Season	Voices From Okinawa		Jonathan Shirota			
2007-2008, 42nd Season	Pippin	Tim Dang	Book by Roger O. Hirson	Stephen Schwartz	Blythe Matsui and Jason Tyler Chong	
2008-2009, 43rd Season: "Beyond Presence"	Be Like Water	Chris Tashima	Dan Kwong			
2008-2009, 43rd Season: "Beyond Presence"	The Joy Luck Club	Jon Lawrence Rivera	Susan Kim, based on the novel by Amy Tan			
2008-2009, 43rd Season: "Beyond Presence"	Ixnay	Jeff Liu	Paul Kikuchi			
2008-2009, 43rd Season: "Beyond Presence"	Marry Me a Little	Jules Aaron	Craig Lucas and Norman René	Stephen Sondheim		
2008-2009, 43rd Season: "Beyond Presence"	The Last Five Years		Jason Robert Brown	Jason Robert Brown		
2009-2010, 44th Season: "Art is..."	Art	Alberto Isaac	Yasmina Reza			
2009-2010, 44th Season: "Art is..."	Po Boy Tango	Oanh Nguyen	Kenneth Lin			
2009-2010, 44th Season: "Art is..."	Cave Quest	Diane Rodriguez	Les Thomas			
2009-2010, 44th Season: "Art is..."	Road to Saigon	Jon Lawrence Rivera	Jon Lawrence Rivera	Nathan Wang		
2010-2011, 45th Season	Mysterious Skin	Tim Dang	Prince Gomolvilas			
2010-2011, 45th Season	Crimes of the Heart	Leslie Ishii	Beth Henley			
2010-2011, 45th Season	Wrinkles	Jeff Liu	Paul Kikuchi			
2010-2011, 45th Season	Krunk Fu Battle Battle	Tim Dang	Book by Qui Nguyen, with lyrics by Beau Sia	Marc Macalintal		
2011-2012, 46th Season: "Languages of Love"	A Widow of No Importance	Shaheen Vaaz	Shane Sakhrani			South Asian Network and USC School of Theatre
2011-2012, 46th Season: "Languages of Love"	The Language Archive	Jessica Kubzansky	Julia Cho			Kaya Press and Libros Schmibros Lending Library & Bookshop
2011-2012, 46th Season: "Languages of Love"	Three Year Swim Club	Keo Woolford	Lee Tonouchi			
2011-2012, 46th Season: "Languages of Love"	A Little Night Music	Tim Dang	Book by Hugh Wheeler	Stephen Sondheim	Reggie Lee	
2012-2013, 47th Season: "Spirited Away"	Encounter	Anil Natyaveda and Aparna Sindhoor	S.M. Raju and Aparna Sindhoor, inspired by a short story by Mahasweta Dav	Isaac Thomas Kottukapally	Anil Natyaveda and Aparna Sindhoor	
2012-2013, 47th Season: "Spirited Away"	Tea, with Music	Jon Lawrence Rivera	Velina Hasu Houston	Nathan Wang		
2012-2013, 47th Season: "Spirited Away"	Christmas in Hanoi	Jeff Liu	Eddie Borey			
2012-2013, 47th Season: "Spirited Away"	Chess	Tim Dang	Tim Rice	Benny Andersson and Björn Ulvaeus		
2013-2014, 48th Season: "Making Light"	Steel Magnolias	Laurie Woolery	Robert Harling		Keali'i Ceballos	
2013-2014, 48th Season: "Making Light"	The Nisei Widows Club: How Tomi Got Her Groove Back	Amy Hill	Betty Tokudani			
2013-2014, 48th Season: "Making Light"	A Nice Indian Boy	Snehal Desai	Madhuri Shekar			
2013-2014, 48th Season: "Making Light"	Beijing Spring	Tim Dang	Tim Dang	Joel Iwataki	Marcus Choi	
2014-2016, Extended Two-Year 50th Anniversary Season: "Golden"	Animals Out of Paper	Jennifer Chang	Rajiv Joseph			
2014-2016, Extended Two-Year 50th Anniversary Season: "Golden"	Takarazuka!!!	Leslie Ishii	Susan Soon He Stanton		Cindera Che	
2014-2016, Extended Two-Year 50th Anniversary Season: "Golden"	Washer/Dryer	Peter J. Kuo	Nandita Shenoy			
2014-2016, Extended Two-Year 50th Anniversary Season: "Golden"	The Who's Tommy	Snehal Desai	Pete Townshend and Des McAnuff	Pete Townshend	Janet Roston	
2014-2016, Extended Two-Year 50th Anniversary Season: "Golden"	Chinglish	Jeff Liu	David Henry Hwang			
2014-2016, Extended Two-Year 50th Anniversary Season: "Golden"	Criers for Hire	Jon Lawrence Rivera	Giovanni Ortega			
2014-2016, Extended Two-Year 50th Anniversary Season: "Golden"	La Cage Aux Folles	Tim Dang	Book by Harvey Fierstein, based on a play by Jean Poiret	Jerry Herman	Reggie Lee	
2016-2017, 51st Season: "Radiant"	Mama Bares in Concert: Once Upon a Play Date	Sean T. Cawelti	Joan Almedilla, Ai Goeku Cheung, Deedee Magno Hall, and Jennifer Paz			
2016-2017, 51st Season: "Radiant"	Road to Kumano					TAIKOPROJECT
2016-2017, 51st Season: "Radiant"	Kentucky	Deena Selenow	Leah Nanako Winkler			
2016-2017, 51st Season: "Radiant"	Free Outgoing	Snehal Desai	Anupama Chandrasekhar			
2016-2017, 51st Season: "Radiant"	Next to Normal	Nancy Keystone	Book and Lyrics by Brian Yorkey	Tom Kitt		
2017-2018, 52nd Season: "The Company We Keep"	Kaidan Project: Walls Grow Thin	Sean T. Cawelti	Lisa Dring and Chelsea Sutton with Rogue Artists Ensemble			
2017-2018, 52nd Season: "The Company We Keep"	Yohen	Ben Guillory	Philip Kan Gotanda			Robey Theatre Company
2017-2018, 52nd Season: "The Company We Keep"	Allegiance (musical)	Snehal Desai	Marc Acito, Jay Kuo, and Lorenzo Thione	Jay Kuo	Rumi Oyama	Japanese American Cultural & Community Center (JACCC)
2017-2018, 52nd Season: "The Company We Keep"	Soft Power	Leigh Silverman	David Henry Hwang	Jeanine Tesori	Sam Pinkleton	Center Theatre Group
2017-2018, 52nd Season: "The Company We Keep"	As We Babble On	Alison M. De La Cruz	Nathan Ramos			
2018-2019, 53rd Season: "Culture Shock"	Vietgone	Jennifer Chang	Qui Nguyen	Shammy Dee		
2018-2019, 53rd Season: "Culture Shock"	Man of God	Jesca Prudencio	Anna Moench			
2018-2019, 53rd Season: "Culture Shock"	Mamma Mia (musical)	Snehal Desai	Catherine Johnson	Bjorn Ulvaeus and Benny Andersson	Preston Mui	
2019-2020, 54th Season: "We Are the Ones We Are Waiting For"	Hannah & the Dread Gazebo	Jiehae Park	Jennifer Chang			The Fountain Theatre
2019-2020, 54th Season: "We Are the Ones We Are Waiting For"	The Great Leap	Lauren Yee	BD Wong			Pasadena Playhouse
2019-2020, 54th Season: "We Are the Ones We Are Waiting For"	Sugar Plum Fairy	Sandra Tsing Loh	Bart DeLorenzo			
2020-2021, 55th Season	Daniel Ho		Andy Lowe			
2020-2021, 55th Season	Today is My Birthday	Susan Soon He Stanton	Lily Tung Crystal			
2020-2021, 55th Season	Kaidan Project: Alone	Lisa Sanaye Dring and Chelsea Sutton				Rogue Artists Ensemble
2020-2021, 55th Season	From Number to Name		Kristina Wong			API Rise
2020-2021, 55th Season	1 Hour Photo	Tetsuro Shigematsu	Richard Wolfe			Vancouver Asian Canadian Theatre
2020-2021, 55th Season	Running	Danny Pudi	Arpita Mukherjee			Hypokrit Theatre Company and EnActe Arts
2021-2022, 56th Season: "Here.Us.Now!"	Assassins	Snehal Desai	Book by John Weidman, music and lyrics by Stephen Sondheim			
2021-2022, 56th Season: "Here.Us.Now!"	Interstate	Jesca Prudencio	Book and lyrics by Kit Yan, music by Melissa Li			
2021-2022, 56th Season: "Here.Us.Now!"	The Great Jheri Curl Debate		Inda Craig-Galván			
2021-2022, 56th Season: "Here.Us.Now!"	The Brothers Paranormal	Jeff Liu	Prince Gomolvilas			
2022-2023, 57th Season	Kristina Wong, Sweatshop Overlord		Kristina Wong			Center Theatre Group
2022-2023, 57th Season	On This Side of the World	Noam Shapiro	Paulo K. Tiról			
2022-2023, 57th Season	Spring Awakening	Tim Dang	Book and lyrics by Steven Sater, music by Duncan Sheik			
2023-2024, 58th Season	Kairos	Jesca Prudencio	Lisa Sanaye Dring			
2023-2024, 58th Season	Unbroken Blossoms	Jeff Liu	Philip W. Chung			
2023-2024, 58th Season	Pacific Overtures		Book by John Weidman, music and lyrics by Stephen Sondheim, additional material by Hugh Wheeler			
2024, 59th Season	Kairos	Jesca Prudencio	Lisa Sanaye Dring			
2024, 59th Season	Unbroken Blossoms	Jeff Liu	Philip W. Chung			
2024, 59th Season	Pacific Overtures		Book by John Weidman, music and lyrics by Stephen Sondheim, additional material by Hugh Wheeler			
2025-2026, 60th Season: "Diamond Legacy"	Cambodian Rock Band	Chay Yew	Lauren Yee; music by Dengue Fever			
2025-2026, 60th Season: "Diamond Legacy"	Yankee Dawg You Die		Philip Kan Gotanda			
2025-2026, 60th Season: "Diamond Legacy"	Paranormal Inside	Jeff Liu	Prince Gomolvilas			
2025-2026, 60th Season: "Diamond Legacy"	Wives		Jaclyn Backhaus			
2025-2026, 60th Season: "Diamond Legacy"	Flower Drum Song	Lily Tung Crystal	Book by David Henry Hwang; music by Richard Rodgers, lyrics by Oscar Hammerstein II			
2025-2026, 60th Season: "Diamond Legacy"	Tam Tran Goes to Washington (Theatre for Youth)	Rona Par	Elizabeth Wong			
