= Jeff Locker =

American actor, playwright, screenwriter, host and author

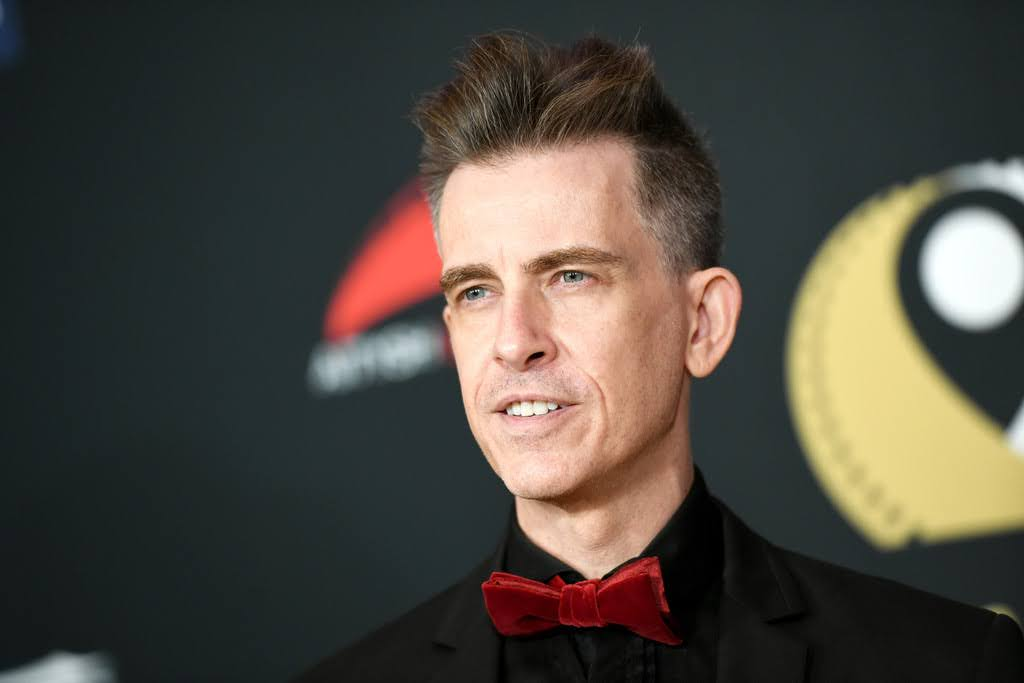
- Locker in 2021
- Born: Canton, Ohio, U.S.
- Education: Yale University; Phillips Exeter Academy

Jeff Locker (傑夫) is an American actor, playwright, screenwriter, host, and author. He appeared on Marvel's Agent Carter, Hulu series Interior Chinatown (TV series), in feature films Stasis, Warner Bros. release Disaster L.A. and Taiwanese box office smash Formula 17 (17歲的天空), in multiple sketches on Jimmy Kimmel Live!, and starred as Peter Timms in the play Chinglish by David Henry Hwang. Among his several award-winning plays, The Forgotten Place won the 43rd Samuel French Off Off Broadway Short Play Festival and is published and licensed worldwide by Samuel French. The Oscar-qualifying short film adaption of The Forgotten Place won 21 awards during its film festival run. As a screenwriter, he made The Black List's GLAAD List and won the Atlanta Film Festival Screenplay Competition. Fluent in Mandarin Chinese, he was the host of the 75th Golden Globe Awards Red Carpet Show, game show Who's Smart 金頭腦 on ETTV America, Sony AXN's Fear Challenge (台灣誰敢來挑戰, a Chinese version of Fear Factor), as well as a host at the Huading Awards, Golden Horse Awards and Golden Bell Awards. He also published eight bestselling books on learning English and understanding American culture and has lectured extensively throughout Taiwan and China.

== Life and career ==
Locker was born and raised in Canton, Ohio. His junior high school teacher and mentor, Laura McIntyre (mother to Grammy-winning musician Macy Gray), encouraged him to apply to the "A Better Chance" program, and he received a full scholarship to the prestigious Phillips Exeter Academy. He spent his junior year living in Rennes, France as part of the SYA School Year Abroad program, where he became fluent in French. During his senior year at Exeter, he received a full scholarship to attend Yale University, where he sang with a cappella group Out of the Blue. He spent his junior year studying at the Beijing Foreign Language Normal University in Beijing, China and at the Taiwan Normal University in Taipei, Taiwan. After graduating from Yale with a B.A. in East Asian Studies, he moved to Taiwan, where he became a television and radio host, and, later, an actor and bestselling author. His radio program 女人有約 － 查某人俱樂部 on the BCC (Broadcasting Corporation of China) won a Golden Bell for Best Radio Variety Program, and a popular television political satire show on which he played George W. Bush, 全民大悶鍋, won a Golden Bell Award for Best Television Variety Program. Locker also hosted the program "Love Radio" on Shanghai Media Group's East Radio Shanghai. While in Asia, he only hosted one English program, on Taiwan's sole English radio station ICRT (International Community Radio Taipei)

Locker also acted in several Taiwanese films, comedies, and soap operas during his career in Asia, including the hit film Formula 17, sitcom This Family is All People (我們一家都是人). He also became the first foreigner to star in a Mandarin production at the famed Taiwan National Theater, in the Chinese language adaption of Peter Shaffer's Black Comedy. A few years later, he appeared again on stage, starring in Teresa Teng: A Musical Story, based on the life of beloved singer Teresa Teng, at the Sun Yat-sen Memorial Hall in Taipei.

In 2009, Locker moved to Los Angeles, California. He graduated from The Second City conservatory in 2009 and iO West in 2011, and has performed as a member of improv troupes Less Hot Dog and Sugar Daddy, as well as musical improv troupes Fancy Pants, NORM! and musical puppet group The Sound and the Furry. In 2012, he joined LA-based vocal ensemble Top Shelf Vocal and became the group's president in 2013.

In 2014, he executive produced and appeared in horror film Good Samaritan, the directorial debut of Jeffrey Reddick, creator of the Final Destination series.

In June, 2015, Locker was the main red carpet host of the Terminator Genisys premiere outside the Dolby Theatre on Hollywood Boulevard, a live telecast that was streamed to China and filmed in both English and Mandarin.

In September, 2016, Paper Children, which he produced and appeared in, was announced as a Top 15 finalist in director Justin Lin's Interpretations Film Initiative contest sponsored by Comcast and NBC Universal. Later that year, he won a StageSceneLA Scenie for Outstanding Performance by an Actor in a Featured Role (Comedy) for his performance as Peter Timms in David Henry Hwang's Chinglish at East West Players in Los Angeles.

In December, 2016, Locker hosted the Chinese Huade Awards and the Huading Awards. In 2018, he was a judge on one of China's most popular TV programs, China Central Television's long-running reality competition show Star of Outlook 希望之星英语风采大赛. In December of that year, he was invited to host the 60th Miss Chinatown USA pageant, held in San Francisco.

Locker's play The Forgotten Place won the prestigious Samuel French Off-Off Broadway Short Play Festival in August, 2018, and was published by Samuel French in 2019. The Forgotten Place went on to be a top finalist in the 2019 National Award for Short Playwriting and got its first professional production in City Theatre's Summer Shorts in Miami in June, 2019 to rave reviews It went on to win Best Script, People's Choice Best Play, and Best Actor at Short+Sweet Hollywood in October, 2019, and he won the NBC Emerging Writer Fellowship. In that same festival, his short play Sweet, She also won Best Production and Best Actress, having just had its world premiere professionally produced theater debut at She Shorts in Fort Lauderdale, Florida. Sweet, He, a companion piece to Sweet, She and fellow Short+Sweet Hollywood finalist, also won a Scenie for Best World Premiere Short Play.

In October, 2019, he was hired as a writer on Jackie Chan's new action film Five Against a Bullet.

In December, 2019, Locker was announced as the emcee of the inaugural Asian Film Festival Awards.

In 2021, he emceed the Asian World Film Festival Closing Night Gala alongside Miss Philippines International 2010 Krista K.

In April 2022, Locker's pilot Spesh was named to the prestigious The Black List's GLAAD List, and that same pilot was announced as the TV pilot winner of the Atlanta Film Festival Screenplay Competition. That same month, his short play The Forgotten Place was also announced as the Best Script and Best Production winner at Short + Sweet in Sydney, Australia.

His next project The Connection, a short film which he wrote and in which he stars, was completed in August 2022. It was directed by Friday the 13th (1980) director Sean S. Cunningham.

In January, 2023, it was announced that Locker was working on three new film projects, including the reboot of horror classic Friday the 13th, 80's camp horror House, and psychological horror The Night Driver
