= And the Soul Shall Dance =

And The Soul Shall Dance is Wakako Yamauchi's first full-length play. Written in 1977, the story involves a young Japanese American girl and her parents as they struggle to live in a white America during the Great Depression. And The Soul Shall Dance grapples with many of the issues facing Japanese Americans in America such as assimilation, immigration, social, economic and political status, and simply surviving in the cruelties of the "California Dream" era.

The play is based on her short story by the same name that was published in Aiiieeeee! An Anthology of Asian-American Writers and was made into a PBS film in 1977. This launched Yamauchi's career as a playwright and awarded Yamauchi with playwriting grants from the Rockefeller Foundation and the Mark Taper Forum to continue her writing. The play went on to win Los Angeles Drama Critics Circle Award for best new play of 1977.

== Characters ==
Masako

An 11 year old American born Japanese girl struggling to understand where she fits into a prejudiced white America. She is the daughter of Murata and Hana and is constantly in need of advice from them, as she is of a more Americanized generation of Japanese Americans.

Kiyoko

A 14 year old Japanese born girl who was brought over from Japan by her father, Oka, after the death of her mother, Shizue. Seeking a better life with the help of Masako, she struggles to understand the ways of America.

Murata

A 40 year old Japanese born American farmer, father of Masako, and husband to Hana. Murata prioritizes hard work, hope, and kindness, and strives to be the mediator of many situations.

Hana

A Japanese born American Farmer, mother of Masako, wife of Murata. Hana has a realistic outlook on the Murata family's situation in America, and seeks a better life, hoping to return to Japan.

Oka

A 45 year old Japanese born American Farmer in his second marriage to Emiko and father to Kiyoko. As he is a neighbor to the Murata family, his unpleasant relationship with Emiko is very noticeable.

Emiko

A 30 year old Japanese woman, wife of Oka and Sister to Shizue. Emiko was sent by her family in Japan to be Oka's second wife as a punishment for the dishonorable acts she committed in Japan.

Shizue

Deceased Japanese former wife of Oka

== Setting ==
The play takes place on two small farms in the Imperial Valley in California near the Mexican border during the early 1930s. During the time of the play, the Great Depression left a deep sense of poverty in places like the Imperial Valley. On top of this, relations between Japan and the US turned sour, leading to a negative view of Japanese Americans and laws restricting their right to property.

== The Set ==
The set for the play is very minimalist, including but not limited to: a kitchen table, a wooden bench, 4 chairs, a bed, and a wall calendar. Props include but are not limited to: A bottle of sake, two cups, a dish of chilies, a phonograph, two towels hanging on pegs on the wall.

== Plot ==
Act 1 Scene 1

The play begins in the Murata's kitchen in 1935, on a June afternoon while Hana is scolding Masako, her eleven-year-old daughter, for accidentally burning down the bathhouse. Murata, the father, walks in and the family begins to argue over how they will shower. Oka, their neighbor, runs in worried about the smoke he saw from down the street. Once he is filled in on what happened, he offers to help rebuild it, but Murata offers Oka a seat and a drink of sake. The two begin to talk about Oka wanting to sell his horse. After a few drinks Oka tells Murata that he needs the money to bring his fifteen-year-old daughter, Kiyoko, over from Japan, and the only way he could think to manage it would be to sell his horse and ask to use Murata's every once in a while.

Oka, having his fill of sake, then explains that as a young boy in Japan, he went to apprentice for a family of blacksmiths with no sons. He eventually married their daughter, Shizue. The family always looked down on him and pushed him around. He decided to go to America when they had a daughter to get away from the humiliation and to make enough money to bring his wife and daughter to America. When Shizue died, the family sent Emiko, Shizue's sister, over to be married to Oka.

After more talk of income, Oka asks Masako if she would help Kiyoko assimilate to the American culture by teaching her English and helping her study. Masako agrees and Oka offers for the whole Murata family to use his bath house whenever they would like and goes home. Hana is weary about going over to Oka's bathhouse because of her strange impression of Emiko, but they get ready to go over anyway.

Act 1 Scene 2

That evening, outside the Oka residence, the Muratas come bowing and ready to bathe. Oka greets them and Emiko awkwardly comes outside, not having been warned of the company. The Muratas offer their sake and Victrola as an icebreaker, but things do not seem to get any warmer. Oka goes inside and the Muratas try to fill the awkward silence with the music from the Victrola, asking Emiko what she liked to listen to, but Emiko simply smokes a cigarette and starts to cry out of nostalgia for her home country of Japan. After Emiko runs inside, Hana fears that she has offended her, but Oka comes back and Masako goes to take her bath. They all agree to find something that is more fun to listen to and put on the song “And the Soul Shall Dance”.

While the music plays, Emiko, seemingly having had a few drinks, comes around the house dressed in a straw hat with her hair down and begins to dance. Everyone is taken off guard, but tries to go along with it. Oka becomes grieved with her behavior and Emiko runs back in the house.

Masako comes back from her short bath and Murata and Hana go to take theirs. Alone with Masako, Oka begins to talk about the help that Kiyoko will need here in America and then goes to the bathroom when the conversation awkwardly dies out. Emiko emerges from the house again and Masako begins to talk with her about the lyrics of the song. The nostalgia leads Emiko to divulge to Masako that she is trying to go back to Japan by herself.

Just then, Emiko sees Oka returning and swiftly goes back into the house. Oka becomes very angry and goes into the house and hits Emiko, calling her crazy. Masako witnesses all of this through the window. Oka composes himself and comes back out as Murata and Hana come back from their shower to see Emiko with a black eye and the Murata family is eager to leave. Emiko tries to engage them in conversation to get them to stay, but they leave and Masako explains what she saw to her parents. Hana quickly decides that they are never going back for a bath at Oka's again.

Act 1 Scene 3

Back at Oka's, he scolds Emiko for her drunken behavior. He calls her a whore for going to school and having a scandalous life, while his wife Shizue slaved away at home to make up for her absence. They begin a heated argument about who is at fault for their situation. Emiko says she wants to go back to Japan, but Oka refuses to help her. After Oka leaves, Emiko reminds herself to keep the dream alive, and pours herself another drink.

Act 2 Scene 1

On a September day, Hana and Masako wonder about what Kiyoko will be like and why life is so hard as a Japanese American. Oka arrives to introduce Kiyoko to the Murata Family and tells them about their 3 days journey home. Kiyoko says little but the traditional Japanese greeting "Hajime mashite" and nods while shyly giggling. Upon seeing how mature Kiyoko looks, Masako goes outside in disappointment. Outside, Masako runs into Emiko, who is eavesdropping, and they quickly talk of boyfriends. When Hana goes to bring her back in, Emiko exits and Masako explains that she feels like a child in a room of adults and she doesn't like the way that Kiyoko giggles and acts. Hana urges Masako to stop being so inconsiderate and forces them both in a room together to talk. After a short and awkward conversation with Kiyoko, Masako leaves again to join her parents.

Act 2 Scene 2

In the kitchen on a November night, the Muratas talk of Ohigan, and Kiyoko's progression since she arrived at school. It begins to storm and they are worried that the fields will flood and freeze, leaving them with a bad crop yield and losing the family a lot of money.

Suddenly, Kiyoko urgently knocks at the door and explains that Oka and Emiko are violently fighting. Hana tries to reassure her that everything is fine and that fighting is normal, but Kiyoko Insists that it is very violent and brutal. She explains that they hide a special brew of alcohol and they get crazy when they drink it. She is worried that Emiko hates her and does not know what to do. Hana explains that everyone has their flaws and that Emiko's behavior has nothing to do with her, but rather her hatred for America. Kiyoko does not want to go back to Oka's and Hana offers to have her sleep with Masako that night.

Oka comes knocking on the door searching for Kiyoko, with a jovial disposition as if nothing had happened. Though Oka tries to brush it off, Hana scolds him and he becomes ashamed. Oka promises to never let it happen again and Hana wraps Murata's robe around Kiyoko and sends them both home for the night.

Act 2 Scene 3

Before school, Masako runs into Kiyoko, whose eyes are red from crying as she quietly tries to return Murata's robe from the night before. Masako succeeds in getting Kiyoko to laugh and offers to share her lunch with Kiyoko, who does not want to go back home to get her own.

Hana is distraught about the storm damage to the crops and Murata tries to reassure her that it will be alright. He promises that in two years' time they will have enough money to go back to Japan. Murata thinks of Kiyoko and Emiko. He realizes that they are lucky with what they have.

Act 2 Scene 4

The following spring, Oka and Kiyoko are all dressed up and ready to go to a picture show. The two discuss Kiyoko's fashion and hair style choices as well as How Masako dresses. Kiyoko says that Oka is enough to make her happy and Oka promises that they will move to a place with suitable boys for her. When Kiyoko is surprised by this, Oka explains that Japanese Americans cannot own land and only lease it for two to three years.

Suddenly Emiko burst out of the house in a frenzy blaming Oka for stealing the money she had been saving to go to Japan. Oka urges Kiyoko to go to the Murata's and then yells at Emiko for stealing that money from him bit by bit. Emiko leaves her crying alone, which turns into her sensuously touching herself with nostalgia for her lover back in Japan.

Act 2 Scene 5

On another day in the late afternoon, Masako and Hana are putting up a furin that Kiyoko gave them and discussing nostalgia for Japan. Emiko timidly enters with a box of expensive kimono, keeping herself from breaking down and asks if they could give her any money for her kimono. Hana says they are too expensive for them and are too nice for country folk and that she would not be doing them justice and insists that she find someone in the city who can pay a better price.

After Emiko leaves in despair, Murata comes wondering what had happened. Hana brushes it off and says she must fix supper. Murata remembers that he forgot to shut the irrigation water off and Masako offers to do it for him. Hana thinks the gates are too heavy for her, but Murata trust her with the responsibility and they shortly discuss how Masako is growing up.

Act 2 Scene 6

When Masako goes to shut off the water, she sees Emiko in the distance, dancing and singing to “And the Soul Shall Dance”, with her hair down, dressed in her beautiful kimono, but scares her away into the distance.

== Author ==
Wakako Yamauchi, born Wakako Nakamuro in 1924 in Westmorland, CA to Japanese immigrant parents, is a female Asian American playwright, short story writer, painter, and poet who allows her struggles as a Japanese American shine through her work.

As a child her family lived in the Imperial Valley near the border of Mexico on a small farm. When she was only seventeen her family was sent to Poston concentration camp in Arizona for a year and a half, and then relocated to Utah, and Chicago, where she got the chance to attend plays and gain a love for theatre. She married Chester Yamauchi in 1948 and had a daughter named joy. In 1960 Rafu Shimpo, a Los Angeles Japanese American newspaper, published Yamauchi's contribution to their holiday edition, giving her one of her first published works and getting her foot in the door as a writer rather than an artist. Then in the 1970s, Aiiieeee published her short story "And The Soul Shall Dance" and adapted it into a full-length play. Since the publishing of the full length And The Soul Shall Dance, Yamauchi has also written a second play called The Music Lessons.

== Influences ==
Yamauchi draws much of her inspiration for her works from her life experience as a victim of racism and class discrimination in America. She has many writers that inspire her to infuse her own personality into her work. Namely, Thomas Wolfe is one of the biggest influences on her work, as Yamauchi was introduced to his work in the Poston internment camp when she was only seventeen years old. Other authors that inspire Yamauchi include: Tennessee Williams, Momoko Iko, and Frank Chin. Many of these writers tackled social issues of Racism, sexism, and sexuality with a grace and style unlike other authors, which resonated with Yamauchi as she struggled to find her voice in a racist America.

In a 1998 Interview Yamauchi said:

"I suppose it began with the Book of Knowledge. My father could not resist a traveling salesman, and he bought twenty volumes Even before most us read. I loved epic poems Scott Longfellow. Also western stories Zane Grey, because knew that lonely dust-and-sage territory. used to read Thomas Wolfe for his enormous passion. After was pressed write plays, Tennessee Williams. stage directions are beautiful."
"Some writers can unchain their minds and soar with the power and fluency of a Momoko Iko or Frank Chin-let a story run, the characters taking the initiative. But I'm always reining in my plots and people. This has to do with my upbringing during the Great Depression."
"A lot of us Nisei are unsure and inarticulate, having grown up in a racist America, bound to our parents' enryo syndrome. Enryo means self-restraint-retreating from your space and your due. If somebody makes a statement that your heart rebels against, you don't say anything. Enryo is also giving up food. If somebody says, "Would you like some tea," you say, "Oh no, no, no. Don't trouble yourself." "How about a cookie?" "I'm not really hungry." You are hungry, but not enough to forget your manners."
"Because of these influences on my development, I'm filled with self-doubt. That's why my stories stay close to home, with people I know. I have to overcome a lot before I set down the first word for the first idea. I am in denial; I still don't truly believe I am a writer. A writer has responsibilities. A writer stands by her words. I'm not sure I can."

== Production history ==
1974- East West Players Los Angeles premiere

1979- Pan Asian Repertory Theater New York City, NY

1990- P.A.R.T. at the Apple Corps Theatre NY

1993- Theatre Off Jackson Seattle, WA

1996- East West Players 30th anniversary season

== Adaptations ==
1977: Hollywood Television Theatre adaptation for a national airing on PBS.

== Critical reception ==
The play hit home for many Japanese Americans during the time. Audiences were moved by the explosion of held back emotions through the play For many audiences feeling the wrath of Racism, this play brings back depressing feelings, however the play spoke a truth for a whole race of Americans. The play became popular in the Asian American communities across the United States and has been brought to regional theaters across the country going on to receive the Los Angeles Drama Critics Circle Award for best new play of 1977.

== See also ==
- Asian-American theatre
