= Jeanne Sakata =

American actress

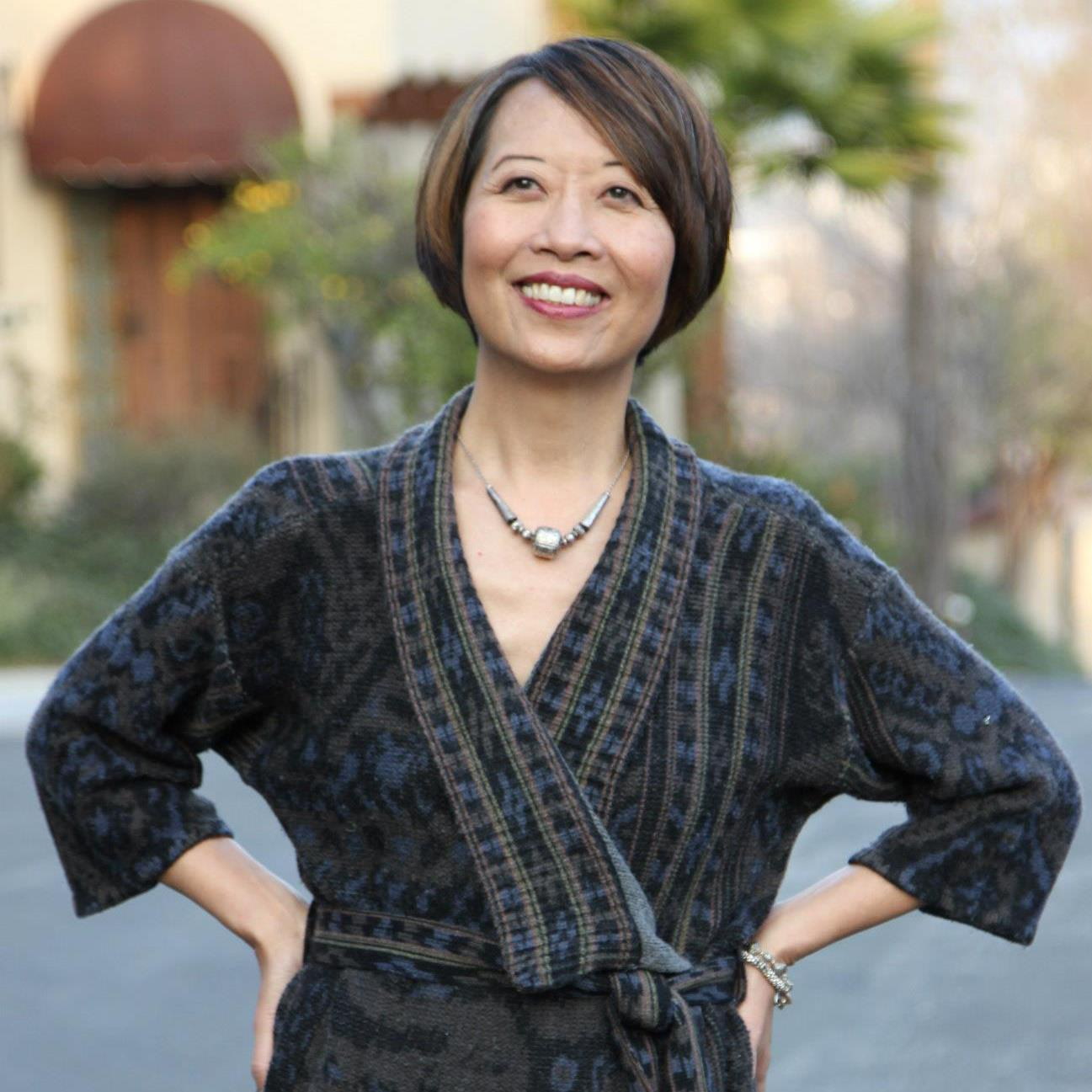
- Actress/playwright Jeanne Sakata in LA in 2013
- Born: Santa Cruz, California
- Occupation: Actress
- Years active: 1985-present
- Spouse: Tim Patterson (m. 1976)

Jeanne Sakata is an American film, television and stage actress and playwright.

== Career ==
Her appearances include supporting roles in episodes of Knots Landing, LA Law, Port Charles, Providence, Family Law, ER, Desperate Housewives and others. Her first appearance on the big screen was in 1992 in the erotic thriller Poison Ivy. In 2005, she appeared in a minor role as a field reporter in the action film XXX: State of the Union.

Sakata has performed in many stage productions, working often with East West Players (EWP) in Los Angeles. In 2002 she won the Ovation Award for Lead Actress in a Play, for her performance in Chay Yew's Red, at EWP. In 2007, her first play, Dawn's Light: The Journey of Gordon Hirabayashi premiered at EWP. The play was later retitled as Hold These Truths. In 2019, she was an honoree at EWP's Night Market event in celebration of her work advancing "the visibility of Asian Americans nationally."

== Filmography ==
Film roles
Year	Title	Role	Notes
1985	Tales of Meeting and Parting		Short film
1992	Poison Ivy	Isabelle	
2002	The Sweetest Thing	Ming	
2004	Hold the Rice	Daisy Green	Short film
2005	XXX: State of the Union	Field Reporter	
2005	American Fusion	Amy	
2006	Fast Money	Jin's Mother	Short film
2006	Guy Night Out	Guy's Mom	Short film
2006	Swimming in Air		Short film
2009	Bottom Feeders	Bea	Short film
2009	Why Am I Doing This?	Rita	
2011	Adultolescence	Mrs. May / Mom	
2012	The Babymakers	Wanda	
2013	Sex & Marriage	Sarah	Direct-to-Video
2014	The Ballet Dancer	Sara	Short film
2015	Advantageous	Soon Yang	
2018	Find Me	Joyce	

Television roles
Year	Title	Role	Notes
1990	Hiroshima: Out of the Ashes	Burned woman	Uncredited; TV Movie
1990	Fine Things	Bernard's Secretary	TV movie
1990	Knots Landing	Shopper #4	Episode: "Do Not Attempt to Remove"
1990	Adam-12	Store Owner	Episode: "Blue Avengers"
1991	L.A. Law	Foreperson #1	Episode: "Good to the Last Drop"
1996	Her Costly Affair	Mrs. Beals	TV movie
1996	Alien Nation: The Enemy Within	Coroner	TV movie
1997	Port Charles	Committee Member	1 episode
1999	Providence	Madam Kim	Episode: "Guys and Dolls"
1999-2001	Family Law	Judge Wilhelmina Chais	2 episode
2002	American Family	Red Cross Official	Episode: "The Forgotten War"
2002-2003	Presidio Med	Nguyen	2 episodes
2004	Line of Fire	Mai Lin	Episode: "I'm Your Boogie Man"
2004	ER	Lucia Rodriguez	Episode: "The Student"
2004	Threat Matrix	Dara Tep	Episode: "Cambodia"
2005	The Reading Room	Martha	TV movie
2006	Desperate Housewives	Li Wang	Episode: "Listen to the Rain on the Roof"
2007	Avatar: The Last Airbender	Ms. Kwan (voice)	Episode: "The Headband"
2010	Meet the Browns	Nee Hi	Episode: "Meet the Seoul Sister"
2015-2016	Dr. Ken	Pam	2 episodes
2018–present	Big Hero 6: The Series	Lenore Shimamoto / Mayor Saito (voice)	3 episodes
2019	High School Musical: The Musical: The Series	Malou	Recurring
2020–present	Station 19	Nari Montgomery	Recurring
