= Keo Woolford =

American actor

- Born: January 26, 1967; Hawaii
- Died: November 28, 2016 (aged 49); Aiea, Hawaii
- Occupations: Actor, producer, director
- Notable work: The Haumāna, I Land

Keo Woolford (January 26, 1967 – November 28, 2016) was an American actor, producer, and director. He was born and raised in Hawaii. He directed the award-winning feature film The Haumāna and the East West Players stage play Three Year Swim Club. He starred in his self-written one-man show, I Land, and as the King of Siam in Rodgers and Hammerstein's The King and I at the London Palladium. He was a member of the Hawaii boyband Brownskin and the Hobo House on the Hill recording team responsible for the Grammy-nominated Island Warriors album. He was a recipient of the Na Hoku Hanohano Award for The Haumāna Soundtrack. His film and TV work included Godzilla, Act of Valor, The Haumāna, and Sergeant Detective Chang on Hawaii Five-0. He died on November 28, 2016, at Pali Momi Medical Center after suffering a stroke three days earlier.

== Awards ==
- 2014 - Na Hoku Hanohano Award - Best Compilation – The Haumāna Soundtrack
- 2014 - Audience Award - Big Island Film Festival – The Haumāna
- 2014 - Best International Film Award - Wairoa Māori Film Festival – The Haumāna
- 2013 - Audience Award - Los Angeles Asian Pacific Film Festival – The Haumāna
- 2013 - Special Jury Award - Los Angeles Asian Pacific Film Festival – The Haumāna
- 2013 - Audience Award - Hawaii International Film Festival – The Haumāna
- 2013 - Audience Award - Philadelphia Asian American Film Festival – The Haumāna
- 2007 - Ovation Award Nomination – I Land
