= Hisaye Yamamoto =

American author (1921–2011)

- Born: August 23, 1921; Redondo Beach, California
- Died: January 30, 2011 (aged 89); Los Angeles, California
- Spouse: Anthony DeSoto
- Writing career
- Genre: Short story
- Subject: Japanese-American Culture Stories
- Notable works: Seventeen Syllables and Other Stories
- Notable awards: American Book Award, Lifetime Achievement.

Hisaye Yamamoto (Japanese: 山本 久枝, August 23, 1921 – January 30, 2011) was an American author known for the short story collection Seventeen Syllables and Other Stories, first published in 1988. Her work confronts issues of the Japanese immigrant experience in America, the disconnect between first and second-generation immigrants, as well as the difficult role of women in society.

== Background and career ==
=== Early life ===
Yamamoto was born to Issei parents in Redondo Beach, California. Her generation, the Nisei, were often in perpetual motion, born into the nomadic existences imposed upon their parents by the California Alien Land Law. Yamamoto developed a strong passion for reading and writing from a young age, leading to the early publication of her work in Japanese-American newspapers. As a teen, her enthusiasm mounted as Japanese-American newspapers began publishing her letters and short stories. Many Issei immigrants were concerned with preserving their native language, while the interests of the Nisei tended more towards expressions of loyalty to the United States, most easily achieved through knowledge and application of the English language. As a result, the communication lines between Japanese parents and their children faced rapid degradation, hampering the preservation of traditional Japanese culture in America. Initially writing solely in English, Yamamoto's recognition of this language barrier and generational gap would soon become one of her primary influences.

=== World War II and the internment of Japanese-Americans ===
On December 7, 1941, Pearl Harbor was bombed by the Japanese Navy. Within four months of the bombing, Japanese-Americans numbering close to 120,000, two-thirds of whom were born on American soil, were forced by the U.S. Government into internment. Leaving homes, farms, and businesses abandoned, this forceful relocation movement contributed to a certain physical, social, and psychological uprooting that Yamamoto would repeatedly address in her work. Japanese women leading ephemeral lives in the United States often had no female confidants outside of the family. Despite significant hardships, Japanese-American women found solace in literature and poetry, which flourished within their communities. In a sense, as a response to the various forms of imprisonment and relocation faced by both Issei and Nisei women, be it jail, internment, poverty, gender, or even marriage, art became the only source of freedom in their lives.

Yamamoto was twenty years old when her family was placed in the internment camp in Poston, Arizona. She had two brothers, one of whom was killed in combat fighting for the United States army during her family's internment. In an effort to stay active, Yamamoto began reporting for the Poston Chronicle, the camp newspaper. She started by publishing her first work of fiction, Death Rides the Rails to Poston, a mystery that was later added to Seventeen Syllables and Other Stories, followed shortly thereafter by a much shorter piece entitled Surely I Must be Dreaming. She briefly left the camp to work in Springfield, Massachusetts, but returned when her brother died while fighting with the U.S. Army's 442nd Regimental Combat Team in Italy. The three years that Yamamoto spent at Poston profoundly impacted all of her writing that followed.

=== Life after the war ===
World War II came to an end in 1945, closing the internment camps and releasing their detainees. Yamamoto and her family returned to California, this time in Los Angeles, where she began working for the Los Angeles Tribune. This weekly newspaper, intended for African American audiences, employed Yamamoto primarily as a columnist, but also as an editor and field reporter. Having spent three years isolated by internment, these next three spent working for the Tribune allowed Yamamoto to explore some of the intricacies of racial interaction in the United States separate from those experienced first-hand in the internment camp. Yamamoto’s work, influenced by her experiences at the Los Angeles Tribune, explored racial dynamics that resonated with a diverse readership beyond the Japanese-American community.

After enjoying much critical acclaim in the late 1940s and early 1950s, Yamamoto married Anthony DeSoto and settled in Los Angeles. The mother of five, Yamamoto has discussed the difficulties she had finding time to write, stating: "Most of the time I am cleaning house, or cooking or doing yard work. Very little time is spent writing. But if somebody told me I couldn't write, it would probably grieve me very much."

DeSoto died in 2003. Yamamoto, who had been in poor health since a stroke in 2010, died in 2011 in her sleep at her home in northeast Los Angeles at the age of 89.

== Writing style and influence ==
Writing under the pen name "Napoleon", Yamamoto became a published writer at the age of 14. Yamamoto's stories are often compared to the poetic form, haiku, described as "layered in metaphor, imagery, and irony, but never wordy or given to digression." She has also been praised "for her subtle realizations of gender and sexual relationships" Her writing has been described as both delicate and economical, often drawing upon themes associated with her Japanese heritage and contemporary American experiences.

Her short stories were compared favorably and stylistically with those of Katherine Mansfield, Flannery O'Connor and Grace Paley.

== Seventeen Syllables and Other Stories ==
This collection was first published in 1988, and includes stories written across a time span of forty years, since the end of World War II. The collection includes some of Yamamoto's most-anthologized works, such as "Yoneko's Earthquake," "The Legend of Miss Sasagawara," "The Brown House," and "Seventeen Syllables," considered by many to be Yamamoto's definitive work.

Her stories, arranged chronologically, explore themes such as generational conflict, cultural assimilation, and racial discrimination among Issei immigrants and their Nisei children. The title is drawn from one of the stories within the collection and refers to the structural requirements of Japanese haiku poetry. Many of the stories have admittedly autobiographical content, making references to the World War II Japanese internment camps, to life in Southern California during the 1940s and '50s, and to the experience of being a writer.

=== Editions of the text ===
The original 1988 version of the text was published by Kitchen Table: Women of Color Press. In 1998, Rutgers University Press released a new edition that included the 1987 short story "Reading and Writing." In 2001, a revised and expanded edition of the book added four more stories written as early as 1942: "Death Rides the Rails to Poston," "Eucalyptus," "A Fire in Fontana," and "Florentine Gardens."

=== List of stories ===
The High-Heeled Shoes: A Memoir (1948)—This story deals primarily with how women are treated in society. The first-person narrator describes instances of sexual harassment she and other women have experienced, from phone solicitations to threats of rape.

Seventeen Syllables (1949)—This story tracks the parallel stories of a young Nisei girl and her Issei mother: the daughter's inability to understand her mother's interest in haiku, the daughter's budding romance with a young Mexican boy, the mother's winning of a haiku contest and the father's resentment of her mother's artistic success. The story explores the generational gap between Issei and Nisei, as well as themes of interethnic interaction, patriarchal repression, and class-based resentment.

The Legend of Miss Sasagawara (1950)—This is the only story that takes place in a Japanese relocation camp. Narrated by a young Japanese-American girl, the story provides a broad portrait of one of the inmates at the camp, the daughter of a Buddhist priest, a woman named Miss Sasagawara, who develops a reputation for acting insane. At the end of the story, a poem written by Miss Sasagawara reveals her lucidity and her sense of being repressed by her Buddhist father. In this way, the story confronts the intersection of ethnic and patriarchal oppression.

Wilshire Bus (1950)—Shortly after World War II, a young Japanese-American narrator observes an American on a bus harassing a Chinese couple, prompting her to internally gloat and then question her own gloating. The narrator contemplates anti-Japanese sentiment as well as the complicated interactions between different ethnic groups.

The Brown House (1951)—A wife becomes an unwilling enabler of her husband's gambling habit, which brings financial trouble on the entire family. This story explores themes of beleaguered wifehood as well as ethnic interactions.

Yoneko's Earthquake (1951)—One of the most complex stories in the collection, "Yoneko's Earthquake" relates two parallel plot lines as observed by the main character Yoneko, a young Nisei girl living on her family's small farm. The story describes the consequences of the arrival of a Filipino farm hand—for both Yoneko, who develops a crush on the man, and for her mother, who commences an affair with him. The story reiterates the theme of mother-daughter, Issei-Nisei, and wife-husband relationships as explored in "Seventeen Syllables."

Morning Rain (1952)—This story relates a moment in time taking place over breakfast between a Nisei daughter and her Issei father. Over the course of the story, we learn that the daughter has married an American man and feels disconnected from her father. The story ends with a sudden revelation that is symbolic of the communication gap between generations: the woman discovers that her father has difficulty hearing.

Epithalamium (1960)—A Japanese-American bride reminisces about her turbulent relationship with her new husband, an Italian American alcoholic whom she met at a Christian community. The story explores the hopes and disappointments of romance, in particular interethnic romance. The title refers to an ancient Greek poetic form written in honor of a bride.

Las Vegas Charley (1961)—A decades-spanning account of the life of an Issei man, the so-nicknamed "Las Vegas Charley." The story charts Charley's immigration to the United States, his marriage and early family life, his confinement in a World War II internment camp for Japanese-Americans, and his subsequent migration to Las Vegas to become a dishwasher. The story describes his earnest attempts and inevitable failures to reform himself and improve his circumstances.

Life Among the Oil Fields, A Memoir (1979)—In this non-fiction account, Yamamoto describes her life on a farm among the oil fields of Southern California. The story ends with her brother Jim's injury in a hit-and-run accident. The Caucasian couple in the car are later tracked down, but they refuse to take responsibility and do not even inquire about Jim's condition.

The Eskimo Connection (1983) — A Japanese-American writer forges a bond with an Eskimo prison inmate through written correspondence. The story paints a humorous and affectionate portrait of interethnic friendship.

My Father Can Beat Muhammad Ali (1986)—An Issei father tries to impress on his American sport-loving sons an interest in Japanese sports. The story reflects the generational gap between traditional-minded Japanese parents and their Americanized children.

Underground Lady (1986)—Describes the encounter between a Japanese-American woman and a white woman, who inadvertently reveals her own racial prejudices. The story reveals a negative side to interethnic interaction, as a counterpoint to "The Eskimo Connection," among others.

A Day in Little Tokyo (1986)—In this story, a young Nisei girl grudgingly accompanies her father and brother to a sumo match, but is left in Little Tokyo, where she observes the comings and goings of the inhabitants. The story explores the generational gap between Issei parents and Nisei children.

=== Overarching themes ===
Disconnection between first- and second-generation immigrants: Many of the stories—notably "Seventeen Syllables," "Yoneko's Earthquake," "Morning Rain," and "Las Vegas Charley"—comment on the generational gap between the Issei and Nisei, a gap exacerbated by the cultural differences between Japan and the United States. There was also a language barrier because many Issei mothers could not communicate well in English, the primary language of Nisei daughters. Nowhere perhaps is this gap more clearly stated than in "Las Vegas Charley," in which the eponymous protagonist mournfully observes, "The young Japanese, the Nisei, were so Americanized now. While most of them still liked to eat their boiled rice, raw fish, and pickled vegetables, they usually spent New Year's Eve in some nightclub." "Las Vegas Charley" observes the generational gap from the perspective of an Issei man and is especially sympathetic to the loss of language and cultural traditions. Other stories, like "Seventeen Syllables," are told from the perspective of the Nisei, and focus on the confusion of American-born children as they struggle to understand their parents' remote native culture. In "Seventeen Syllables," the narrator's apathy towards haiku is linked to her more serious inability to empathize with her Japanese mother.

Repression of women in Japanese and American societies: The very first story in the anthology, "The High Heeled Shoes," foregrounds the issue of male tyranny over women's bodies and minds, in the dual forms of sexual harassment and social expectations on women to be passive. For example, the story makes a feminist critique of Mahatma Gandhi's advice to be pacifistic in the face of violence. "The High Heeled Shoes" deals with sexual harassment across ethnic lines. Other stories in the collection deal with gender roles and female repression in the context of Japanese culture. Several stories deal with the disappointments of marriage. The long-suffering wife is a recurring character, figuring as martyrs in stories like "Seventeen Syllables," "Yoneko's Earthquake," and "The Brown House." Many of Yamamoto’s stories highlight the struggles of women in patriarchal structures, often depicting husbands as controlling or emotionally distant figures.

Ambiguous interactions between ethnic communities in America: Yamamoto depicts America as a complex network of different ethnicities, made even more complicated by the prejudices and hierarchies created by each ethnic group. Her stories depict interactions between Japanese immigrants and diverse ethnic groups, including Anglo-Americans, Mexicans, Chinese, Filipinos, African-Americans, and Indigenous peoples of Alaska. Several of these interactions emphasize cultural misunderstanding and hostility, for example American hostility towards the Japanese after World War II. Other stories portray ethnic interaction as positive, productive, and meaningful to the parties involved. "The Eskimo Connection" tracks the unusual friendship between a Japanese author and an aspiring Eskimo writer corresponding from prison. Sometimes Yamamoto creates surprising twists based on unexpected moments of empathy or misunderstanding between two groups. In "The Brown House," a black man's interaction with a Japanese family is an occasion for cooperation and gratitude, but also for prejudice ("a kurombo!").

=== Adaptations ===
The 1991 American Playhouse special Hot Summer Winds, directed by Emiko Omori, was based upon Yamamoto's "Seventeen Syllables" and "Yoneko's Earthquake."

== Awards ==
Hisaye Yamamoto received acclaim for her work almost from the very beginning of her career. She was, as King-Kok Cheung noted, "one of the first Japanese-American writers to gain national recognition after the war, when anti-Japanese sentiment was still rampant." Although she herself resisted being rigidly characterized as a voice for Japanese or Asian groups ("I don't think you can write aiming at a specifically Asian-American audience if you want to write freely"), she was considered one of the premier Asian-American authors.

Awards and Fellowships

- 2010: Asian American Writers Workshop's Lifetime Achievement Award
- 1988: Association for Asian American Studies's Award for Literature for Seventeen Syllables
- 1986: Before Columbus Foundation's American Book Award for Lifetime Achievement
- 1952: "Yoneko's Earthquake" named one of Best American Short Stories
- Early 1950s: Declined a Stanford University Writing Fellowship in order to pursue social work
- 1950–51: John Hay Whitney Foundation Opportunity Fellowship

Tribute

- 2021: Google celebrated her with a Google Doodle.

== Secondary sources ==
- Cheung, King-Kok. "Hisaye Yamamoto b. 1921." The Heath Anthology of American Literature, Vol. E, 5th Edition. New York: Houghton Mifflin company, 2006: pages 2162–2163.
- –––. "Introduction," in Hisaye Yamamoto, Seventeen Syllables and Other Stories (New Brunswick, New Jersey: Rutgers University Press, 2001): pages ix–xxiii.
- –––. "Hisaye Yamomoto and Wakako Yamauchi." IN: Words Matter: Conversations with Asian American Writers. Honolulu, Hawaii: University of Hawaiʻi Press, with UCLA Asian American Studies Center; 2000: pages 343–382.
- –––. "Reading between the Syllables: Hisaye Yamamoto's Seventeen Syllables and Other Stories." IN: Maitino, and Peck, Teaching American Ethnic Literatures: Nineteen Essays. Albuquerque: University of New Mexico Press; 1996: pages 313–325.
- –––. "The Dream in Flames: Hisaye Yamamoto, Multiculturalism, and the Los Angeles Uprising." IN: Bucknell Review: A Scholarly Journal of Letters, Arts and Sciences, 1995; 39 (1): pages 118–130.
- –––. Articulate Silences: Hisaye Yamamoto, Maxine Hong Kingston, Joy Kogawa. Ithaca: Cornell University Press, 1993.
- –––. "Thrice Muted Tale: Interplay of Art and Politics in Hisaye Yamamoto's 'The Legend of Miss Sasagawara'." MELUS, 1991–1992 Fall; 17 (3): pages 109–125.
- –––. "Double-Telling: Intertextual Silence in Hisaye Yamamoto's Fiction." American Literary History, 1991 Summer; 3 (2): pages 277–293.
- Crow, Charles L.; Yamamoto, Hisaye (1987). "A MELUS Interview: Hisaye Yamamoto". MELUS. 14 (1): 73–84. doi:10.2307/467474. JSTOR 467474.
- –––. "The Issei Father in the Fiction of Hisaye Yamamoto." IN: Truchlar, Für eine offene Literaturwissenschaft: Erkundungen und Eroprobungen am Beispiel US-amerikanischer Texte/Opening Up Literary Criticism: Essays on American Prose and Poetry. Salzburg: Neugebauer; 1986: pages 34–40.
- –––. "Home and Transcendence in Los Angeles Fiction." IN: Fine, Los Angeles in Fiction: A Collection of Original Essays. Albuquerque: University of New Mexico Press; 1984: pages 189–205.
- Yogi, Stan. "Rebels and Heroines: Subversive Narratives in the Stories of Wakako Yamauchi and Hisaye Yamamoto." IN: Lim, and Ling, Reading the Literatures of Asian America. Philadelphia: Temple University Press; 1992: pages 131–150.
- –––. "Legacies Revealed: Uncovering Buried Plots in the Stories of Hisaye Yamamoto." Studies in American Fiction, 1989 Autumn; 17 (2): pages 169–181.

== See also ==
- List of Asian American writers
