= Denise Uyehara =

American performance artist and writer

Denise Uyehara is an American performance artist, director and writer. Her interdisciplinary and solo performances and installations examine and explore memory, time-travel, immigration, race, sexuality, and gender. She is the founding member of the performance group Sacred Naked Nature Girls, a group of four women of different ethnicities and sexual orientation, who use their bodies as a means to construct identities and inspire dialogue. Her work is internationally recognized and has been featured in exhibitions in Los Angeles, Helsinki, London, Tokyo, and Vancouver. She is also the author of two full-length plays, Hobbies and Hiro. Uyehara is a fellow of the Asian Cultural Council.

== Early life ==
Uyehara was born in 1966 in Tustin, California to Japanese American parents. She attended the University of California, Irvine, graduating in 1989 with a BA in comparative literature, continued her education at the University of California, Los Angeles, where she received her M.F.A. in arts.

== Recent work ==
Shooting Columbus premiered in 2017 as part of the Borderlands Theater Season, the culmination of a multi-year collaboration between Indigenous and non-Indigenous artists in the Southwest region. Uyehara was one of five lead artists in the Fifth World Collective that realized the project. Shooting Columbus investigates the consequences and ethics of time travel along with the United States’ continual genocide of its native people. The project received support from the MAP Fund and the Network of Ensemble Theaters. Other works include Dreams & Silhouettes/Suenos y siluetas, a multidisciplinary installation piece that uses dancers, actors, and painters to discuss militarization, deportation, and detention in Tucson, Arizona, performed at the Global Justice Center in 2014. Uyehara has also collaborated with Indigenous performance and visual artist James Luna, which resulted in their live works "Transitions" at L.A.C.E. (2012) and "Ancestral Cartographic Rituals" (2017) at Stanford University, both unpack cultural authenticity, tradition and memory in the United States. Archipelago, a collaborative piece featuring video artist Adam Cooper-Teran emphasize cultural survival and loss, spirituality, and deities in respect to the ancient myths of Okinawa. She collaborated with Sri Susilowati in Pageantry, a performance piece that interrogates the cultural role of Asians in the Americas, in 2008.

== Major works ==
Hobbies (1989)

Hiro (1993)

Headless Turtleneck Relatives (1993)

Hello (Sex) Kitty: Mad Asian Bitch on Wheels (1994)

Maps of City and Body (1999)

Big Head (2003)

The Senkotsu (Mis)Translation Project (2006-2010)

Archipelago (2012)

Transitions with James Luna (2012)

Dreams and Silhouettes/Suentos y Siluetas (2014)

Shooting Columbus (2017)

Ancestral Cartographic Rituals with James Luna (2017)

== Awards and recognition ==
Uyehara's first major award was from the Brody Arts Fund in 1993, followed by a commission from AT&T: OnStage Productions for Hiro, at East West Players in 1994. Her work has since been supported by the MAP Fund, The Network of Ensemble Theaters, Los Angeles Department of Cultural Affairs, the Arizona Commission on the Arts, the National Performance Network, and the California Civil Liberties Public Education Project. Her work has been featured as a Critic's Choice” by L.A. Weekly several times, as a solo artist, playwright, and as one of The Sacred Naked Nature Girls. She has led numerous community workshops for artists in different communities including LGBT, women, people of color, and seniors. She was inducted into the Asian Cultural Council in the Spring of 2013 for her work investigating the "migration across borders of identity" for Asian American people.
