= Velina Hasu Houston =

American poet

- Born: Velina Hasu Houston; May 5, 1957 (age 69); At sea, en route between America and Japan
- Occupations: Playwright, author, screenwriter
- Writing career
- Period: Mid-1970s – present
- Genre: Multiple
- Subjects: Racism, sociology, feminism, immigration, assimilation

Velina Hasu Houston (born Velina Avisa Hasu Houston on May 5, 1957) is an American writer. Primarily an internationally acclaimed playwright and librettist, she is also a published poet, screenwriter for film and television, and essayist.

Her work draws from her experience of being multiracial as well as from the immigrant experiences of her family, her multi-ethnicity, and intersection of culture, race, gender, and region.

Houston is best known for her play Tea, which portrays the lives of Japanese international brides, often known as war brides, who move to the United States with their U.S. American serviceman husbands who are of varied racial backgrounds. Tea had its professional premiere Off-Broadway at Manhattan Theatre Club in 1987, and was designated by Roundabout Theatre as an American theatre canon classic. Since its premiere, the play continues to be produced globally. The Los Angeles Female Playwrights Institute referred to Tea as "one of the most widely produced Asian American plays worldwide."

== Early life ==
Houston, the youngest of three, was born in international waters outside of Japan on a U.S. military ship. Her Japanese mother, Setsuko Takechi, was originally from Matsuyama, Ehime, a provincial town on Shikoku Island. Her father, Lemo Houston, was an African-American, Blackfoot-Pikuni Native American, Spanish, and Portuguese man originally from Linden, Alabama.

In 1946, the parents of Velina met each other in Kobe, initiating a nine-year courtship despite disapproval from Velina's maternal grandfather. The grandfather, devastated by his country's defeat in World War II and the loss of his family's land due to the land reform policies backed by the U.S. occupation, died by suicide. Following their marriage, the couple eventually had little contact with both sides of their respective families. The family settled in Junction City, Kansas, a small town adjacent to the military base, living a culturally Japanese lifestyle at the insistence of Velina's mother, Setsuko.

In 1969, as a result of combat-related stress and alcoholism, Velina's father died. Setsuko continued raising her family in Junction City. She died in 2022 at the age of 93.

== Education ==
Houston attended graduate school at the University of California at Los Angeles and at the University of Southern California. She holds a PhD from USC's School of Cinematic Arts, and an MFA from the University of California at Los Angeles' School of Theater, Film, and Television. She also attended Kansas State University in Manhattan, Kansas, majoring in journalism and theater with a minor in philosophy. She is a Phi Beta Kappa.

Houston serves as a Distinguished Professor of Theatre in Dramatic Writing at the USC School of Dramatic Arts and is USC's Resident Playwright. She is on the Board of Trustees of Berklee College in Boston.

== Personal life ==
Houston has been married to Peter Henry Jones of Manchester, England, since 2002, and resides in Los Angeles, California. She has two children, Kiyoshi and Leilani.

== Awards and fellowships ==
Houston has been recognized as a Japan Foundation Fellow, a Rockefeller Foundation Fellow, a Sidney F. Brody Fellow, a James Zumberge Fellow (thrice), a California Arts Council fellow, a Los Angeles Endowment for the Arts Fellow, and a Doris Duke Charitable Foundation fellow; in addition, she was a co-recipient of a fellowship from the Andrew Mellon Foundation.

Her archives are held at The Huntington Library, Art Museum, and Botanical Gardens, San Marino, California.

== Works ==
- Anthologies
  - (ed.) The Politics of Life: Four Plays by Asian American Women. Philadelphia: Temple University Press, 1993. Anthology of plays by Wakako Yamauchi, Genny Lim and Velina Hasu Houston.
  - (ed.) But still, like air, I'll rise: new Asian American plays. Philadelphia: Temple University Press, 1997. Anthology of plays by Jeannie Barroga, Philip Kan Gotanda, Velina Hasu Houston, Huynh Quang Nhuong, David Henry Hwang, Victoria Nalani Kneubuhl, Sung Rno, Dmae Roberts, Lucy Wang, Elizabeth Wong and Chay Yew.
- Theatrical Works
  - Tea
  - Asa Ga Kimashita (Morning Has Broken)
  - American Dreams
  - Kokoro (True Heart)
  - Setting the Table
  - Calligraphy
  - Oh I Remember the Black Birch
  - Little Women (A Multicultural Transposition)
  - Cinnamon Girl (book and lyrics by Houston)
  - Calling Aphrodite
  - The Everywhere of Her (book and lyrics by Houston), and others.
