= Jennifer Lim (theatre actress) =

American actress

Jennifer Lim (born 1979) is an American theatre actress most noted for her performance in the 2011 Broadway show Chinglish by playwright David Henry Hwang, appearing at the Longacre Theatre.

== Personal life ==
Lim was born in Hong Kong. She obtained a Bachelor's degree in Drama from the University of Bristol in 2000, and subsequently studied for an MFA at the Yale School of Drama. She is fluent in Mandarin, Cantonese and English.

== Acting background ==
Lim's career has taken her all over the world, as she built up a variety of international credits necessary to qualify for a U.S. visa. She played Ophelia in a Mandarin Chinese performance of Hamlet directed by Richard Schechner in Poland and Shanghai, appeared in Medea in Turkey and in a performance of Songs of the Dragons Flying to Heaven in Vienna. She has also performed in Scotland, Belgium, Spain, Germany and Norway.

She had a role in the 2008 Hollywood movie 27 Dresses, which starred Katherine Heigl, and TV appearances on As the World Turns, The Good Wife and Royal Pains.

In 2009, Lim appeared in This Isn't Romance by In-Sook Chapell at the Soho Theatre in London. Michael Billington of The Guardian described her performance as "highly impressive as Miso, managing to modulate the character's ferocious mix of lust, anger, guilt and self-hatred."

In 2010, Lim appeared in the role of Desdemona in Ching Chong Chinaman at the West End Theatre in New York City. Lim and fellow actor Jon Norman Schneider were described in Nytheatre.com as "especially adept at convincingly portraying teenagers" and "extraordinary actors at the top of their game".

In 2014, Lim starred as Sunny in a new play, The World of Extreme Happiness, by Frances Ya-Chu Cowhig, at Goodman Theatre in Chicago; and in the co-production with Goodman Theatre at the Manhattan Theatre Club in New York City in February 2015.

In 2016, Lim had a recurring role in the fifth season of the American television series Hell on Wheels.

== Critical reception in Chinglish ==
In Chinglish, Lim plays Vice Minister Xi Yan, described as "a sexy, fearsome, no-nonsense Chinese official who takes matters into her own carefully manicured hands".

Reviewing the Chicago debut of Chinglish at the Goodman Theatre, Nina Metz of the Chicago Tribune wrote that Lim's performance was "Played with intellectual dexterity and a ripe sense of comedy" and said that "this is Lim's coming out party as an actress". In New York Magazine, Scott Brown called her performance on Broadway "just plain superb" and wrote: "Rarely do we get to see a woman over the age of 30 and under the age of 60 express herself with such self-possession, such unquirky steadiness of soul, such sexual and emotional matter-of-factness. Funny, fierce, effortlessly precise (she transforms one word — "What?" — into a dizzying symphony of evasions, feints, and strategic retreats), Lim turns in a Tony-worthy performance of a marvelous role, a triumph in any language." Ben Brantley of the New York Times called Lim's performance "strident and sensual" and said it "hints at a real complexity." Jeremy Gerard wrote in Bloomberg.com that Lim's character is "keenly mixing steeliness and sexual predation".

In 2012 Lim was the recipient of the first Immigrant Artists and Scholars in New York (IASNY) Trophy for Excellence for her work in Chinglish.

== Performance history ==
=== Theatre ===
Film / Show	Role
Chinglish	Xi Yan
Ching Chong Chinaman	Desdemona
Vengeance Can Wait	Namase
This Isn't Romance	Miso Blake
Songs of the Dragons	Korean #3
Yokastas Redux	Yoyo
Deviant	Sara
