= Prince Gomolvilas =

Thai American playwright (born 1972)

- Born: August 28, 1972 (age 54); Indianapolis, Indiana, USA
- Occupations: Writer, playwright

Prince Gomolvilas (born August 28, 1972) is a Thai American playwright. He has written many plays which have been produced in the United States and won several distinctive awards, including a PEN Center USA West Literary Award for Drama.

He was born in Indianapolis, Indiana, the son of Thai-born parents. His family moved to California when he was age seven and he spent most of his youth in Monrovia. He attended San Francisco State University and received a BA in film and screenwriting and an MFA in creative writing and playwriting.

== Playwriting ==
=== Plays ===
In 1992, while living in San Francisco, Gomolvilas began writing plays. His plays include Big Hunk o' Burnin' Love (1998), The Theory of Everything (2000), winner of the Beverly Hills Theatre Guild/Julie Harris Playwright Award, the International Herald Tribune/SRT Playwriting Award, and the PEN Center USA West Literary Award for Drama, Bee (2001), and the stage adaptation of Mysterious Skin (2003), which is based on the novel by Scott Heim.

In collaboration with musician Brandon Patton, Gomolvilas wrote Jukebox Stories, in which he also performs in. A self-described "storytelling/song-singing/bingo-playing theatrical extravaganza," the three, different full-length shows ran in 2006 as Jukebox Stories, in 2008 as Jukebox Stories: The Case of The Creamy Foam and in 2013 as Jukebox Stories: The Secrets of Forking. The initial runs of the shows were at the Impact Theater in Berkeley, California, but eventually expanded to a wide array of venues including other theaters, coffee shops, bars, colleges, comedy clubs, music venues and more in Boston, Los Angeles, Middletown (CT), Minneapolis, New York, Philadelphia, Smithfield (RI), and Washington (DC), as well as the National Asian American Theater Festival. The show received strong reviews in the East Bay Express and the San Francisco Chronicle, was also an "Editor's Pick" in Theatre Bay Area magazine.

Gomolvilas' other plays include Seat Belts and Big Fat Buddhas (1999), Debunking Love' (2000), Boyz of All Nationz: The Rise and Fall of a Multi-Ethnic Boy Band (2002), and The Fabulous Adventures of Captain Queer (2006). He frequently writes comedies with a supernatural twist.

Gomolvilas also developed at TheatreWorks in the San Francisco Bay Area the short plays Oskar: The Kid That Could (which encourages students to embrace reading and writing), Oskar and the Big Bully Battle (which confronts the issue of bullying), and Oskar and the Last Straw (which tackles issues of self-worth and resiliency). These three plays have been touring elementary schools throughout the Bay Area since 2006. The Alley Theatre in Houston began touring Oskar and the Big Bully Battle in 2014, and has commissioned Gomolvilas to write Oskar and the Curiously Colorful Clash, a play about diversity that will start touring in 2015.

To supplement the California Student Safety and Violence Prevention Act of 2000, the New Conservatory Theatre Center's YouthAware Educational Theatre in San Francisco commissioned Prince to research, develop, and write the play Outspoken, which explores the many reasons teenagers feel ostracized and which has been touring to middle schools and high schools throughout Northern and Central California since 2005.

Recurring themes in his work include the contemporary Asian-American experience, the tension between immigrants and their offspring, queer identity, race relations in the United States, the trauma of displacement, and the complexities of loss and grief.

=== Short plays ===
His short plays include Cause and Effect on Clement Street (Actors' Theatre, Santa Cruz, 1997), Donut Holes in Orbit (Ensemble Studio Theatre, New York City, 1998), Cyclops (Theatre Rhinoceros, San Francisco, 2001), Bridges (City Lights Theatre Company, San Jose, 2002), The Last Gayorcism (Chalk Repertory Theatre, Los Angeles, 2010), Chunky Mary (Ferocious Lotus Theatre Company, San Francisco, 2010), ATM (East West Players' Studio Lab Project, Los Angeles, 2011), and Heteronesia (Impact Theatre, Berkeley, 2014).

=== Awards ===
For his play, The Theory of Everything (2000), Gomolvilas won the PEN Center USA Literary Award for Drama, the Julie Harris/Janet and Maxwell Salter Playwright Award from the Beverly Hills Theater Guild, and the International Herald Tribune/SRT Playwriting Award.

For his other plays, Gomolvilas received the East West Players' Made in America Award for Outstanding Artistic Achievement for the Asian Pacific Islander Community.

Gomolvilas has received grants from the National Endowment for the Arts and Wallace Alexander Gerbode Foundation. He has also received new-play commissions from the South Coast Repertory, the Alley Theatre, the Asian Stories in America Theatre, TheaterWorks, the Impact Theatre, the Lorraine Hansberry Theatre, the New Conservatory Theatre Center, the Playwrights Foundation, and the Center Theatre Group's Asian Theatre Workshop.

His plays has also been developed at American Conservatory Theater, Bay Area Playwrights Festival, Bear Arts Foundation's ColorFest, Center Theatre Group, Chalk Repertory Theatre, Ford Amphitheatre, Lark Play Development Center, La Jolla Playhouse, Ma-Yi Theatre Company, and South Coast Repertory, the Asian Stories in America Theatre, The Drill Hall, DueEast Theatre Company, East West Players, Edinburgh Festival Fringe, International Dublin Gay Theatre Festival, Lorraine Hansberry Theatre, New Conservatory Theatre Center, Orlando International Fringe Festival, Pork Filled Players, Rude Guerrilla Theater Company, Singapore Repertory Theatre, SIS Productions, Vancouver Asian Canadian Theatre, and Vertigo Theatre Productions. Geographically, his plays have been produced around the United States in such cities as Arlington, Chicago, Los Angeles, Nashville, New York, Orlando, Portland, San Francisco, Santa Ana, Seattle, and Washington (DC), as well as in Canada, England, Ireland, Scotland, and Singapore.

== Films ==
Gomolvilas wrote the screenplay for the short film Lunchtime (directed by Keo Woolford) which was an Official Selection of the Boston Asian American Independent Film Festival, the Asian American International Film Festival in New York, Outfest, the San Diego Asian Film Festival, the Sicilia Queer FilmFest in Italy (where it won a Special Jury Prize), the Thessaloniki International LGBTQ Film Festival in Greece, and Tokyo Asian Queer Film Festival and other film festivals.

He has also served on the jury of the South East European Film Festival.

Gomolvilas was also selected for a prestigious and competitive screenwriting fellowship with The Chesterfield Writer's Film Project, a program sponsored by Paramount Pictures. Currently, he is developing a feature-length screenplay tentatively entitled Straight Face, for award-winning filmmaker PJ Raval.

== Teaching and other work ==
Gomolvilas has served as the associate director of the Master of Professional Writing Program at the University of Southern California, where he is also an assistant professor in writing. He has also taught in the David Henry Hwang Writers Institute at East West Players.

In 2013, Gomolvilas presented a TEDx talk in "Mind the Gap" at Chapman University.

Gomolvilas, who has also lived in Bangkok, Thailand, currently lives in Los Angeles.

== Plays ==
- Big Hunk o' Burnin' Love (1998)
- Seat Belts and Big Fat Buddhas (1999)
- The Theory of Everything (2000)
- Debunking Love (2000)
- Bee (2001)
- Boyz of All Nationz: The Rise and Fall of a Multi-Ethnic Boy Band (2002)
- Mysterious Skin (2003) [Gomolvilas' first play adaptation from a book]
- The Fabulous Adventures of Captain Queer (2006)
- Jukebox Stories (in collaboration with Brandon Patton) (2006)
- The Brothers Paranormal (2019)

== Awards ==
- 1998: Beverly Hills Theatre Guild/Julie Harris Playwright Award, The Theory of Everything
- 1998: International Herald Tribune/SRT Playwriting Award, The Theory of Everything
- 2001: PEN Center USA West Literary Award for Drama, The Theory of Everything
- 2006: East West Players Made in America Award for Outstanding Artistic Achievement for the Asian Pacific Islander Community
- National Endowment for the Arts Grant
- Wallace Alexander Gerbode Foundation Grant
