= King-Kok Cheung =

American literary critic

- Occupation: Professor
- Writing career
- Genres: Fiction; Literary criticism
- Notable works: Articulate Silences: Hisaye Yamamoto, Maxine Hong Kingston, Joy Kogawa

King-Kok Cheung is an American literary critic specializing in Asian American literature and is a professor in the department of English at UCLA.

== Early life ==
Cheung grew up on Hong Kong Island.

== Education ==
Cheung received her Ph.D. in English from the University of California, Berkeley in 1984.

== Selected bibliography ==
- Asian American Literature: An Annotated Bibliography, 1988 (with Stan Yogi)
- Articulate Silences: Hisaye Yamamoto, Maxine Hong Kingston', Joy Kogawa, 1993
- An Interethnic Companion to Asian American Literature, 1996 (editor)
- Words Matter: Conversations With Asian American Writers, 2000 (editor)
- Seventeen Syllables and Other Stories. Revised and Updated with four new stories, 2001 (introduction)
- Heath Anthology of American Literature, Fifth Edition, 2006 (co-editor)
- Chinese American Literature Without Borders, 2016 (Author)
