= Tim Dang =

American actor (born 1958)

Timothy Dang
- Born: August 4, 1958 (age 67); Hawaii, United States
- Occupations: Actor, theatrical director
- Years active: 1986-present
- Spouse: Darrel Cummings

Timothy G. Dang (born August 4, 1958) is an American actor and theatre director originally from Hawaii of Asian origin. He served as the artistic director at the Asian American theatre company, East West Players (EWP), in Little Tokyo, Los Angeles, California until 2016.

== Early life and education ==
Dang was born on August 4, 1958, in Honolulu, Hawaii to Peter You Fu and Eloise Yuk (née Ung) Dang. Of Chinese American descent, his father was an accountant at Shell Oil, and his mother was a clerk for the local District Court of Honolulu. Dang had four older siblings: Peter, Stephen, Edwin, and Kathleen. Peter Dang died in January 1971 when Tim was 12.

Tim Dang attended St. Patrick School, a Catholic parochial school in Honolulu. Music and theatre were a large part of student life, and helped Dang to express himself. He then attended Saint Louis School, a college preparatory institution for boys. He was an excellent student, and took classes at the University of Hawaii while still in high school. Although he intended to major in math or science in college, Dang was more attracted to theatre. Although the expense was significant, his mother paid for him to take dancing, piano, and singing lessons so he could advance his dreams of being on stage.

Encouraged by his oldest brother, Peter, to attend a mainland college, Dang enrolled at the University of Southern California in the fall of 1976. A financial aid package covered most of his expenses. His first role in college was as a dancer in a production of Follies, and he was frequently cast in leading roles in plays at USC.

When he was a senior, Jack Rowe, a professor (and later associate dean and director of the BFA Acting program) at the USC School of Dramatic Arts, warned him that mainland film, television, and theatrical productions were not inclusive, and he would have a tough time making a living as an actor. Rowe encouraged him to find work with the East West Players.

Dang graduated with a bachelor of Fine Arts degree in theatre in 1980.

== Career ==
After graduation, Dang became a member of East West Players. He paid $35 a month in dues, which allowed him to take acting classes with the troupe's founders and permitted him to audition for EWP productions. He waited table and appeared in television commercials to earn a living.

He became artistic director in 1993, succeeding Nobu McCarthy, guiding the company's transition from a small theatre company producing Equity 99-seat shows, to a mid-sized company in a 240-seat house in 1995. As a director, he has mounted productions at Singapore Repertory Theatre, Asian American Theater Company in San Francisco, Mark Taper Forum New Works Festival, Celebration Theatre, West Coast Ensemble, and the Perseverance Theatre in Juneau, Alaska. He has won numerous awards for directing and performing, including two Ovation Awards. He has served on the board of LA Stage Alliance.

In 2019, Dang was awarded the Visionary Award at EWP's annual gala for his contributions toward furthering API visibility in the industry.

== Personal life ==
Even though Asians and Pacific Islanders make up the majority of the population in Hawaii, Dang saw few Asian actors on film or television as a child. Seeing George Takei play Hikaru Sulu on Star Trek impressed him, as Takei was one of few actors of Asian descent on TV. Dang later said that Takei became the role model for him and inspired his acting career.

Dang is married to Darrel Cummings, retired chief of staff at the Los Angeles LGBT Center.

Dang and Cummings have been important supporters of actor Wilson Cruz. When work was scarce for Cruz in 2002, Cummings (then with the National LGBTQ Task Force) hired him to give him an income. During another lull in his career, Dang and Cummings took Cruz into their home. "You put a roof over my head, fed me, you kept me safe, in an act of generosity that I promise you I will never forget," Cruz said in 2022.

== Filmography ==
=== Television ===
Year	Title	Role	Notes
1986	Night Court	Prince Maurice	Episode: "Prince of a Guy"
1987	Star Trek: The Next Generation	Tactical Officer "Main Bridge Security"	Episode: "Encounter at Farpoint"
1990	Hunter	Tun Roh	Episode: "A Snitch'll Break Your Heart"
1994	Brooklyn Bridge	Donald Lee	Episode: "War of the Worlds"
1997	Extreme Ghostbusters	Various characters	Voice
1997	The Blues Brothers Animated Series	John Fun	Voice
1999–2000	Batman Beyond	King Cobra, Driver	Voice, 2 episodes
2000	The Wild Thornberrys	Fareri Farani	Voice, episode: "Song for Eliza"
2001	The Zeta Project	Captain	Voice, episode: "His Maker's Name"
2008	Avatar: The Last Airbender	Yon Rha	Voice, episode: "The Southern Raiders"
2024	Squid Game (Season 2)	Im Jeong-dae	English dub

=== Film ===
Year	Title	Role	Notes
1989	Listen to Me	Bobby Chin	
1994	Deadly Target	Choy	
2003	Batman: Mystery of the Batwoman	Kevin	Voice, direct-to-video; uncredited
2026	Avatar Aang: The Last Airbender	Grand Chamberlain	Voice

=== Video games ===
Year	Title	Role	Notes
1997	Blade Runner	Izo	
2004	GoldenEye: Rogue Agent	Triad Informant	
2007	Uncharted: Drake's Fortune	Pirates	
