= Jeff Liu =

American writer and director

Jeff Liu is an American writer, screenwriter, theater director, composer, and film director.

His theatrical productions include the world premieres of: Texas, Solve for X by Judy Soo Hoo, Murderabilia, Terminus Americana (Ovation Award nominee for Best World Premiere) by Matt Pelfrey, The Golden Hour, Grace Kim and the Spiders from Mars by Philip W. Chung, The Chinese Massacre (ANNOTATED) by Tom Jacobson, and Ixnay, Wrinkles and Slice by Paul Kikuchi.

Liu wrote and directed a two-part film called Yellow Face, based on David Henry Hwang's play of the same name, which blends elements of stage drama, a YouTube sketch, and a short film. It premiered at the 2013 Los Angeles Asian Pacific Film Festival.

His comedic short films include: Great Moments in Asian American History, Qi Lime Pie, and A Super Duper Exotic Erotic Fetish Sexy Must-See Story, which premiered with other "naughty" shorts at the 2012 San Diego Asian American Film Festival.

Liu co-wrote Charlotte Sometimes, a feature film directed by Eric Byler that explores the complex relationships among four Asian Americans. it won the Audience Award for Best First Feature at the 2002 South by Southwest Film Festival and received two Independent Spirit Awards nominations.

Previously, Liu was the Literary Manager at East West Players and the David Henry Hwang Writers' Institute at East West Players, and Resident Director for Lodestone Theatre Ensemble during its ten-year run.

Liu graduated Phi Beta Kappa from UC Berkeley in Dramatic Art and earned his MFA in Theatre Direction from the UCLA School of Theater, Film and Television.

== Filmography ==
=== Film ===
- 2008 The Sensei - Matthew.
- 2013 Yellow Face - Director. Producer.
- 2016 The Last Tour - Paul. Writer. Executive producer.
- 2017 Cow - Director. Executive producer. Short film.
