= Momoko Iko =

Japanese-American playwright (1940–2020)

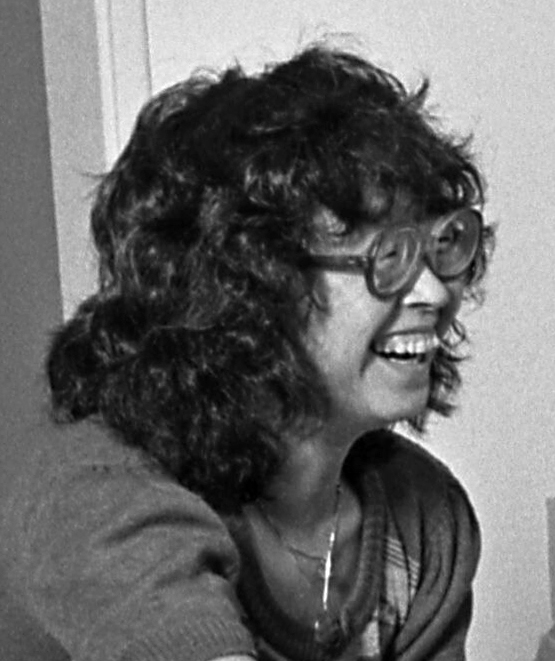
- Iko in 1980
- Born: March 30, 1940; Wapato, Washington, USA
- Died: July 19, 2020 (aged 80); Los Angeles, California USA
- Education: University of Illinois
- Organization: Pacific Asian American Women Writers West (PAAWWW)
- Notable work: Gold Watch (Stage Play), 1970
- Spouse(s): James "Jimmy" Otis McCloden, January 17th, 1994 - July 19th, 2020

Momoko Iko (Japanese: 伊香 桃子, March 30, 1940 – July 19, 2020) was a Japanese-American playwright, best known for her 1972 play Gold Watch. She was also a founding member of the Asian Liberation Organization and the Pacific Asian American Women Writers West.

== Life ==
Momoko Iko was born to Kyokuo and Natsuko (Kagawa) Iko on March 30, 1940, in Wapato, Washington. She was the youngest of six children, two older brothers (Tets and Kei) and three older sisters (Yae, Mina, and Sono. After the start of World War II, Iko was incarcerated, aged two, at the Portland Assembly Center before being transferred to the Heart Mountain Relocation Center following the signing of Executive Order 9066. Her family were the last to leave the camp in 1945, as they did not know where to go. The family initially worked as migrant farm workers in New Jersey before settling in Chicago. In Chicago, her father found work as a day laborer and her mother as a seamstress. She found writing inspiration from her life in Chicago, where she said her house was "like a center for young Nisei."

== Career and Literature ==
Iko studied at Northern Illinois University and the University of Illinois at Urbana-Champaign, graduating with a BA in English with honors in 1961. She also studied at the Instituto Allende in Mexico and started an MFA at the University of Iowa, where she met the writer Nelson Algren. At this time, became a founding member of the Asian Liberation Organization in Chicago, where she contributed and edited their Asian Liberation newsletter.

After seeing Lorraine Hansberry's play A Raisin in the Sun, Iko turned an unpublished novel into her first play, Gold Watch. Gold Watch focused on the impact of Executive Order 9066 on the Japanese American Agrarian Community in Wapato, Washington before its forced removal. The play follows protagonist Masu Murakami as he led resistance against the forced relocation of his community, celebrating human courage and a struggle for dignity.

She submitted Gold Watch to the East West Players Theater Company National Playwriting Contest for Asian-American Writers, where it won. It was then produced at the Inner City Cultural Center in Los Angeles in 1972. Gold Watch is thought to be the first play written by an Asian American woman produced in the continental United States.The play had several productions and was shown on television on PBS in 1975. New York Women in Flim restored this PBS production in 2016.

Her subsequent play, Old Man, won the same award the following year.

In 1975, she published Flowers and Household Gods. Unlike Gold Watch, this play focused on the aftermath of relocation and assimilation policies on Japanese American families. Following three generations of a Chicago-based Japanese American family, the Kagawas, this play starts with a funeral of the family matriarch and sees the breakdown of the patriarch and the internal identity struggles felt by the Nisei children, Mas, Junko, and Mazie. Themes of distortion of tradition and familiar hierarchy are prevalent throughout.

Over a decade later in 1987, Flowers and Household Gods received a sequel in the form of Boutique Living and Disposable Icons. This play focuses on the impending wedding of Mazie's (a child from Flowers and Household Gods) niece to a Nisei man named Glenn, who desperately wants to be seen as an American citizen. In a continuation of the themes in Flowers and Household Gods, Boutique Living and Disposable Icons is a struggle between Glenn's difficult, painful process of assimilation, Mazie's ex-hippie search for identity, and Glenn's father's traditional views and heritage.

Since then, her plays have been produced by the Pan Asian Prepertory, New York City; The Asian American Theater Company, San Francisco; The Northwest Asian Theater Company, Seattle; The East West Players, Los Angeles; and the Inner City Cultural Center, Los Angeles.

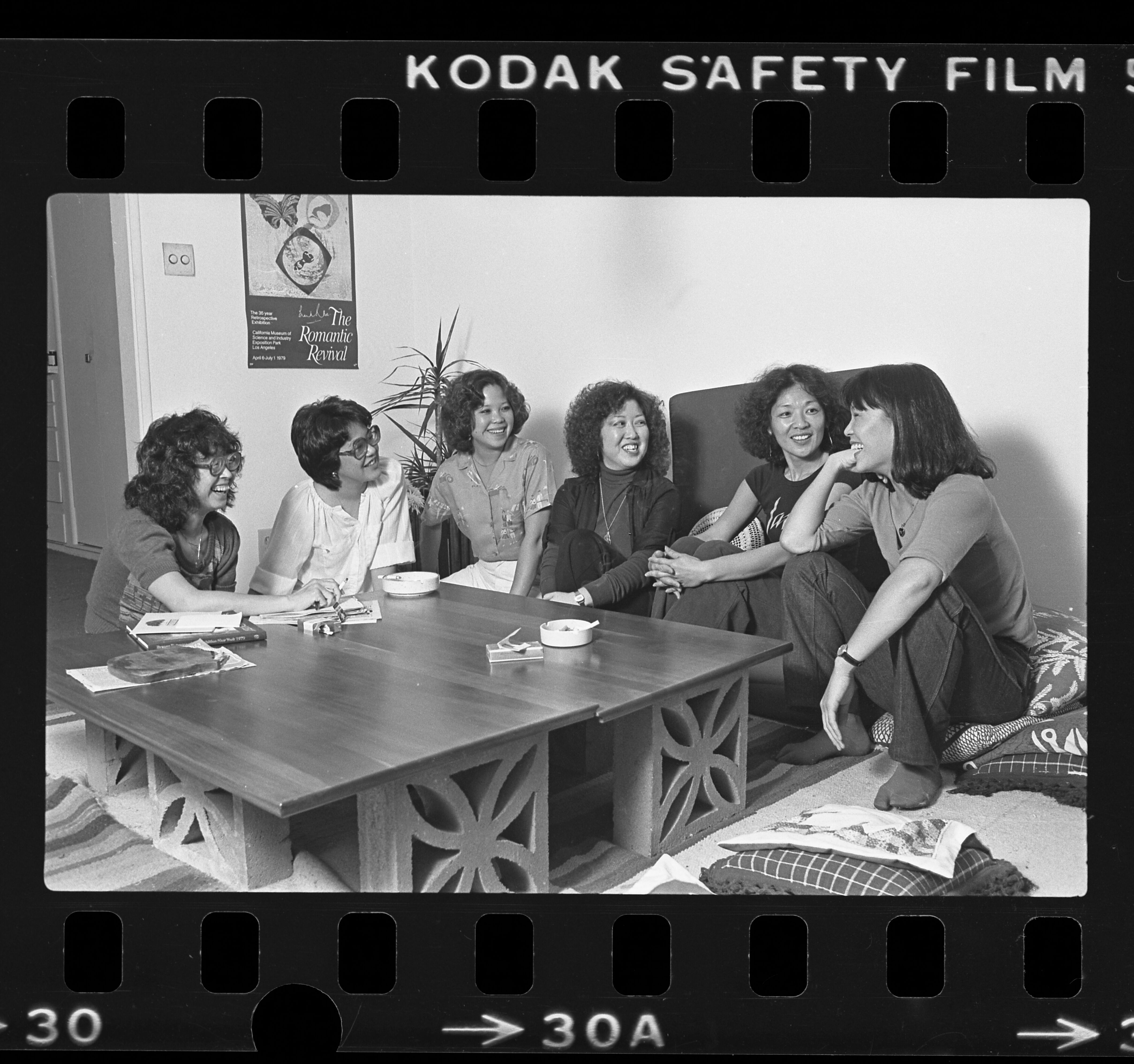
Momoko Iko, far left, at a meeting of Pacific Asian American Women Writers West in Los Angeles.

Iko moved from Chicago to Los Angeles in the late 1970s. There she was a founder member of Pacific Asian American Women Writers West (PAAWWW). She died at her Los Angeles home on July 19, 2020.

== Works ==
- Gold Watch, 1970. Produced at the Inner City Cultural Center, Los Angeles, 1972. Excerpted in Frank Chin et al. (ed.) Aiiieeeee! An Anthology of Asian-American Writers, 1974. Published in Roberta Uno (ed.) Unbroken thread: an anthology of plays by Asian American women. Amherst: The University of Massachusetts Press, 1993.
- Old Man, 1971.
- When We Were Young, 1973. Produced by the East West Players, Los Angeles 1974 and at the Asian American Theater Company, San Francisco, 1976.
- Flowers and Household Gods, 1975. Produced at the Pan Asian Repertory Theatre, Perry Street Theatre (New York, N.Y.), June 24, 1981, and Northwest Asian American Theater, Seattle, 1984. Published in Roberta Uno (ed.) Asian American Playwrights Scripts Collection 1924-1992, Special Collections and Archives, W.E.B Du Bois Library, U of Massachusetts, Amherst, 1976.
- Second City Flat, 1976. Produced at the Inner City Cultural Center, Los Angeles, 1978. Published in Roberta Uno (ed.) Asian American Playwrights Scripts Collection 1924-1992, Special Collections and Archives, W.E.B Du Bois Library, U of Massachusetts, Amherst, 1976.
- Hollywood Mirrors, 1978. Produced at Asian American Theater Company, San Francisco, 1978. Asian American Theater Company Archives, U of California, Santa Barbara, 1978.
- Boutique living and disposable icons: a family comedy in two acts, 1987. Produced at the Pan Asian Repertory Theatre, Perry Street Theatre (New York, N.Y.), June 24, 1988. Library for the Performing Arts, New York Public Library, 1987.
