= Aparna Sindhoor =

Indian-American choreographer (born 1970 or 1971)

- Born: India
- Education: Boston University; Mysore University
- Occupations: Dancer; choreographer; actor

Aparna Sindhoor (born 1970/1971) is an Indian-American choreographer, dancer, and teacher. She is the artistic director of Navarasa Natyalaya Dance Theater.

== Background and Education ==
Sindhoor is from Mysore, India. She began dancing at the age of five, first learning from her mother. She trained in Bharatanatyam for approximately 15 years with K. Venkatalakshamma, who emphasizes Abhinaya (facial expression) and Jathis (pure dance compositions). She also studied singing and theatre.

She holds a master's degree in English and a bachelor's degree in dance, literature, and dramatics. She received her doctorate in "Dance, Women, and Culture" from Boston University.

== Career and awards ==
Sindhoor has given professional performances since her arangetram (graduation solo recital) in 1989.

Sindhoor founded the Navarasa Dance Theatre Sindhoor in Mysore, India, in 1991 with her husband, film director SM Raju, and fellow choreographer Anil Natyaveda. She moved to the United States in 1997/1998. After moving, the theatre was based in Boston, Massachusetts. In 2012, Sindhoor developed Encounter, a dance-theatre performance based on a short story by Mahasweta Devi for Navarasa.

In 2013, Sindhoor choreographed "Visions of an Ancient Dreamer" for Brandeis theatre students.

Sindhoor's works have been showcased in the US, Canada, Germany, and India, including venues and festivals such as the Jacob's Pillow, Lincoln Center, New Jersey Performing Arts Center, La Mama, and New Haven Festival of Arts and Ideas. She was one of the choreographers selected for the New England Foundation for the Arts's RDDI program. Sindhoor's choreography was included in Boston-based Underground Railway Theater's "A Disappearing Number" in 2014.

In 2022, she choreographed EnActe Art's "The Jungle Book: Rudyard Revised" in Palo Alto, California.

She is a part-time faculty member at Santa Monica College.

== Awards ==
Aparna Sindhoor earned a gold medal in Dance from Mysore University.

In 2013, Sindhoor received the NPN Creation Funds Award for My Dear Muddu Palani. In the same year, she was also nominated for Los Angeles Stage Alliance Ovation Award for Choreography.

In 2020, Sindhoor received $1,000 from the AAPI Civic Engagement Fund to create a digital piece of art to encourage voter turnout.

== Dance theatre works ==
- River Rites (2001)
- A Story and A Song (2007)
- Encounter (2012)
- Snake and Ladder (2017)
- The Vote Dance (2020)
- The Naked Line (2021)
- Plantation Talas
- Refugee Ragas
- The Hunt
