= Wakako Yamauchi =

Japanese American playwright and writer (1924–2018)

- Born: October 23, 1924; Westmorland, California, U.S.
- Died: August 16, 2018 (aged 93); Gardena, California, U.S.
- Writing career
- Genre: Drama
- Notable works: And the Soul Shall Dance; The Music Lessons
- Notable awards: Los Angeles Drama Critics Circle Award (1977)

Wakako Yamauchi (Japanese: 山内 若子, October 23, 1924 – August 16, 2018) was a Japanese American playwright and short story writer. Her plays are considered pioneering works in Asian-American theater.

== Biography ==
Yamauchi (née Nakamura) was born in Westmorland, California. Her mother and father, both Issei, or first-generation Japanese immigrants, were farmers in California's Imperial Valley. Many of her stories and her two plays, And the Soul Shall Dance and The Music Lessons, are set in the same dusty, isolated settings". Her plays and stories examine the hardships that Japanese Americans faced in California's agricultural communities and in the internment camps during the second World War. In 1942, at seventeen, Yamauchi and her family were interned at the Poston, Arizona camp; the title of her play 12-1-A refers to the family's address in the War Relocation Authority camp. While there, she worked on the camp newspaper, the Poston Chronicle, alongside fellow writer Hisaye Yamamoto, with whom Yamauchi would maintain a lifelong friendship.

After a year and a half in Poston, Yamauchi resettled outside camp, first in Utah and then in Chicago, where she began to take in interest in theater. In 1948, she married Chester Yamauchi, with whom she had one child before the couple divorced. She returned to the Los Angeles area, where she studied painting at Otis Art Institute (now called Otis College of Art and Design) and continued to write. Her first published story, And the Soul Shall Dance, appeared in Aiiieeeee! An Anthology of Asian-American Writers. Encouraged by East West Players director Mako, she soon after adapted the story into a play. The stage version of And the Soul Shall Dance was first performed at the East West Players in Los Angeles in 1974, and won the 1977 Los Angeles Drama Critics Circle Award for best new play. It was later produced for public television.

Rosebud and Other Stories, a collection of stories she wrote in her seventies and eighties, was edited by Lillian Howan and published by University of Hawai'i Press in 2010. A collection of her plays and stories was published in 1994 under the title Songs My Mother Taught Me: Stories, Plays and Memoir.

In 2018, Yamauchi died in Gardena, California at the age of 93.

== Works ==
Some of Yamauchi's best-known short stories depict the tensions between the aspirations of Issei women and the patriarchal norms of Issei culture. The stories And the Soul Shall Dance and Songs My Mother Taught Me both depict Issei women struggling to fulfill ambitions that contradict traditional gender roles. And the Soul Shall Dance represents one of the most straightforward depictions of an Issei woman's rebellion. By depicting the complex relationships among the female characters, Yamauchi portrays Issei women's resistance and containment.

== See also ==
- List of Asian American writers
- Japanese American internment

== Scholarly studies ==
The following articles are listed in the MLA database and are arranged from most recent to oldest:

- "A Dying Reed by the Riverbed," in The Impossible Land:Story and Place in California's Imperial Valley (University of New Mexico press, 2008): pp. 105–128.
- "Wakako Yamauchi" By: Jew, Kimberly M.. pp. 343–47 IN: Madsen, Deborah L. (ed. and introd.); Asian American Writers. Detroit, MI: Gale; 2005.
- "'A Few Footprints of Our Sojourn Here': A Conversation with Wakako Yamauchi" By: Clem, Billy. pp. 313–29 IN: Alonso Gallo, Laura P. (ed. and introd.); Voces de América/American Voices: Entrevistas a escritores americanos/Interviews with American Writers. Cádiz, Spain: Aduana Vieja; 2004.
- Luce Irigaray's Choreography with Sex and Race By: Mori, Kaori; Dissertation Abstracts International, Section A: The Humanities and Social Sciences, 2002 July; 63 (1): 189. State U of New York, Buffalo, 2002. (examines And the Soul Shall Dance)
- "And the Soul Shall Dance by Wakako Yamauchi" By: Sumida, Stephen H.. pp. 221–32 IN: Wong, Sau-ling Cynthia (ed. and introd.); Sumida, Stephen H. (ed. and introd.); A Resource Guide to Asian American Literature. New York, NY: Modern Language Association of America; 2001.
- "Jungian and Mythological Patterns in Wakako Yamauchi's And the Soul Shall Dance" By: Osumi, M. Dick; Amerasia Journal, 2001; 27 (1): 87-96.
- "'Nostalgia' or 'Newness': Nihon Buyo in the United States" By: Sellers-Young, Barbara; Women & Performance: A Journal of Feminist Theory, 2001; 12 (1 [23]): 135-49.
- "The Politics of Re-Narrating History as Gendered War: Asian American Women's Theater" By: Hara, Eriko; Journal of American and Canadian Studies, 2000; 18: 37-49.
- "Hisaye Yamamoto and Wakako Yamauchi" By: Cheung, King-Kok. pp. 343–82 IN: Cheung, King-Kok (ed. and introd.); Words Matter: Conversations with Asian American Writers. Honolulu, HI: U of Hawaii P, with UCLA Asian American Studies Center; 2000.
- "A MELUS Interview: Wakako Yamauchi" By: Osborn, William P.; MELUS, 1998 Summer; 23 (2): 101-10. online
- The Politics of Life: Four Plays by Asian American Women By: Houston, Velina Hasu (ed.). Philadelphia: Temple UP; 1993. (contains Yamauchi's plays The Chairman's Wife and 12-1-A)
- "Rebels and Heroines: Subversive Narratives in the Stories of Wakako Yamauchi and Hisaye Yamamoto" By: Yogi, Stan. pp. 131–50 IN: Lim, Shirley Geok-lin (ed. & introd.); Ling, Amy (ed. & introd.); Kim, Elaine H. (fwd.); Reading the Literatures of Asian America. Philadelphia: Temple UP; 1992.
- "Relocation and Dislocation: The Writings of Hisaye Yamamoto and Wakako Yamauchi" By: McDonald, Dorothy Ritsuko; MELUS, 1980 Fall; 7 (3): 21-38.
