= Cherylene Lee =

American actress and writer

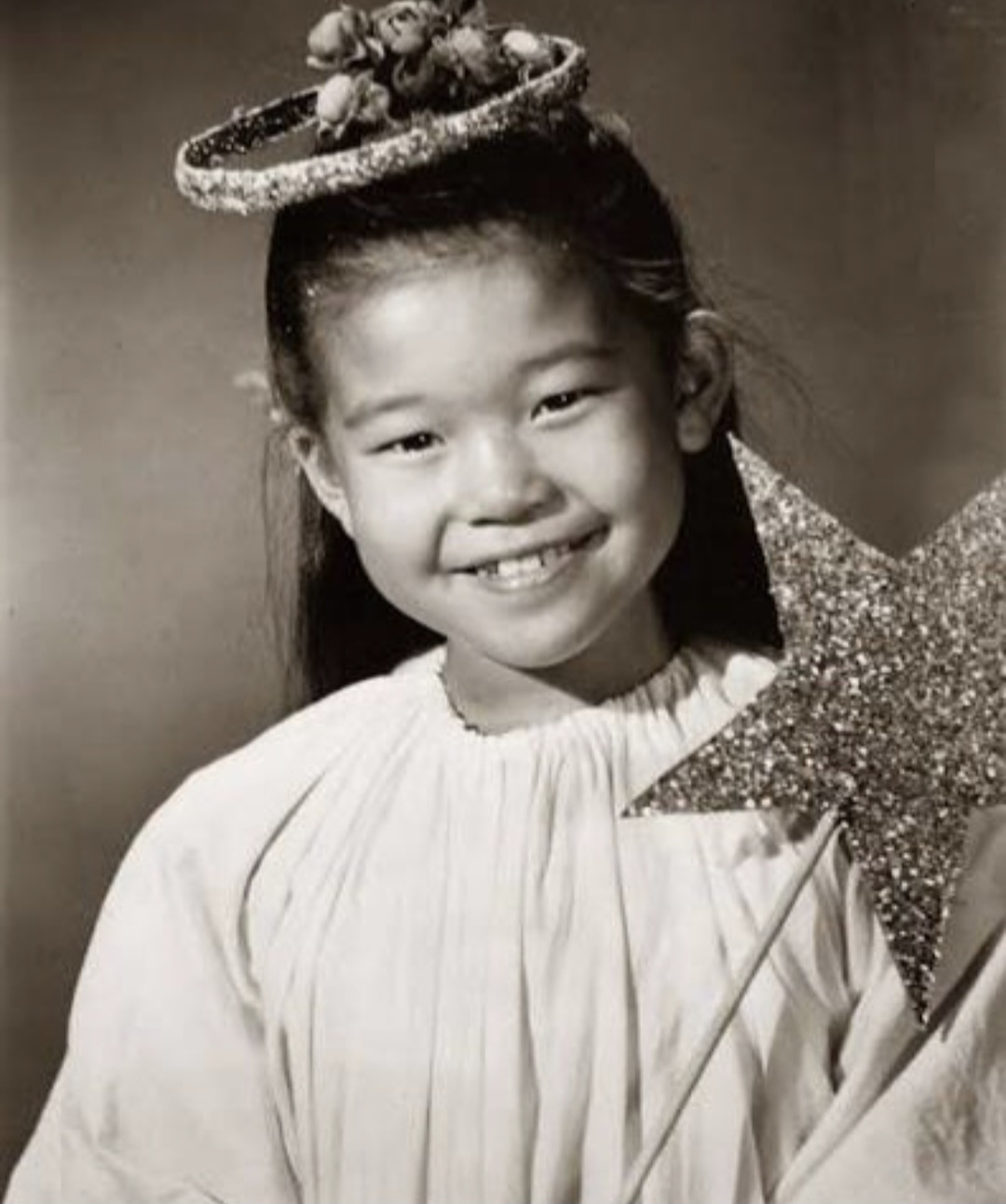
- Cherylene Lee in 1963
- Born: Cherylene Alice Lee; June 13, 1953; Los Angeles, California
- Died: March 18, 2016 (aged 62); San Francisco, California
- Occupations: Actress, writer
- Years active: 1956-1977

Cherylene Alice Lee (June 13, 1953 – March 18, 2016) was an American actress and writer.

== Life ==
Lee was born and raised in Los Angeles, and was a fourth-generation Chinese-American. She had two sisters, Priscilla "Puggy" and Virginia. She began a career as a child actress and dancer at age three, and performed in a song and dance team with her sister Virginia in Las Vegas for three summers. She graduated from UC Berkeley with a BA in Paleontology and from UCLA with an MS in Geology. She subsequently managed an alternative wastewater treatment plant as a Disney Imagineer. In 1977, she returned to the stage, performing in A Chorus Line. In 1983, she began writing plays, poetry, and fiction. Her plays include The Legacy Codes about the Wen Ho Lee affair and Carry the Tiger to the Mountain about the death of Vincent Chin.

In 2015, Lee self-published an autobiography, "Just Like Really": An Uncommon Chinese American Memoir. On March 18, 2016, Lee died in her sleep with her two sisters at her side, after a long battle with breast cancer.

== Filmography ==
=== Film ===
Film
Year	Title	Role	Notes
1961	Flower Drum Song	Wang's Youngest Daughter	Uncredited
1963	Donovan's Reef	Sarah "Sally" Dedham	

=== Television ===
Television
Year	Title	Role	Notes
1956	Playhouse 90	Asian Girl	1 episode
1962	Dennis the Menace	Sen Yuen	1 episode
1962	Bachelor Father	Blossom	2 episodes
1962	The Lloyd Bridges Show	Lo-Ri	1 episode
1962	Mr. Smith Goes to Washington	Mi Ok	1 episode
1962	Ensign O'Toole	Kim Yo	1 episode
1962	Stagecoach to Dancers' Rock	Ah Ling	TV movie
1962–1963	McHale's Navy	Kim Su; Tani	2 episodes
1963–1964	Vacation Playhouse	Kim Chi; Samantha Soo	2 episodes
1964	Ben Casey	Suzie Umeki	1 episode
1964	Kentucky Jones	Annie Ng	3 episodes
1965	My Three Sons	Lee Ahn	1 episode
1965	A Letter to Nancy	Nancy Lee	TV movie
1967	The F.B.I.	Linn	1 episode
1968	Missy's Men	Missy (as Tracey Lee)	TV movie
1972	The Amazing Chan and the Chan Clan	Susie Chan; Mimi Chan (voice)	16 episodes
1975	M*A*S*H	Korean Daughter	1 episode; uncredited
1977	Corey: For the People		TV movie
