= Lily Tung Crystal =

Asian American theater director

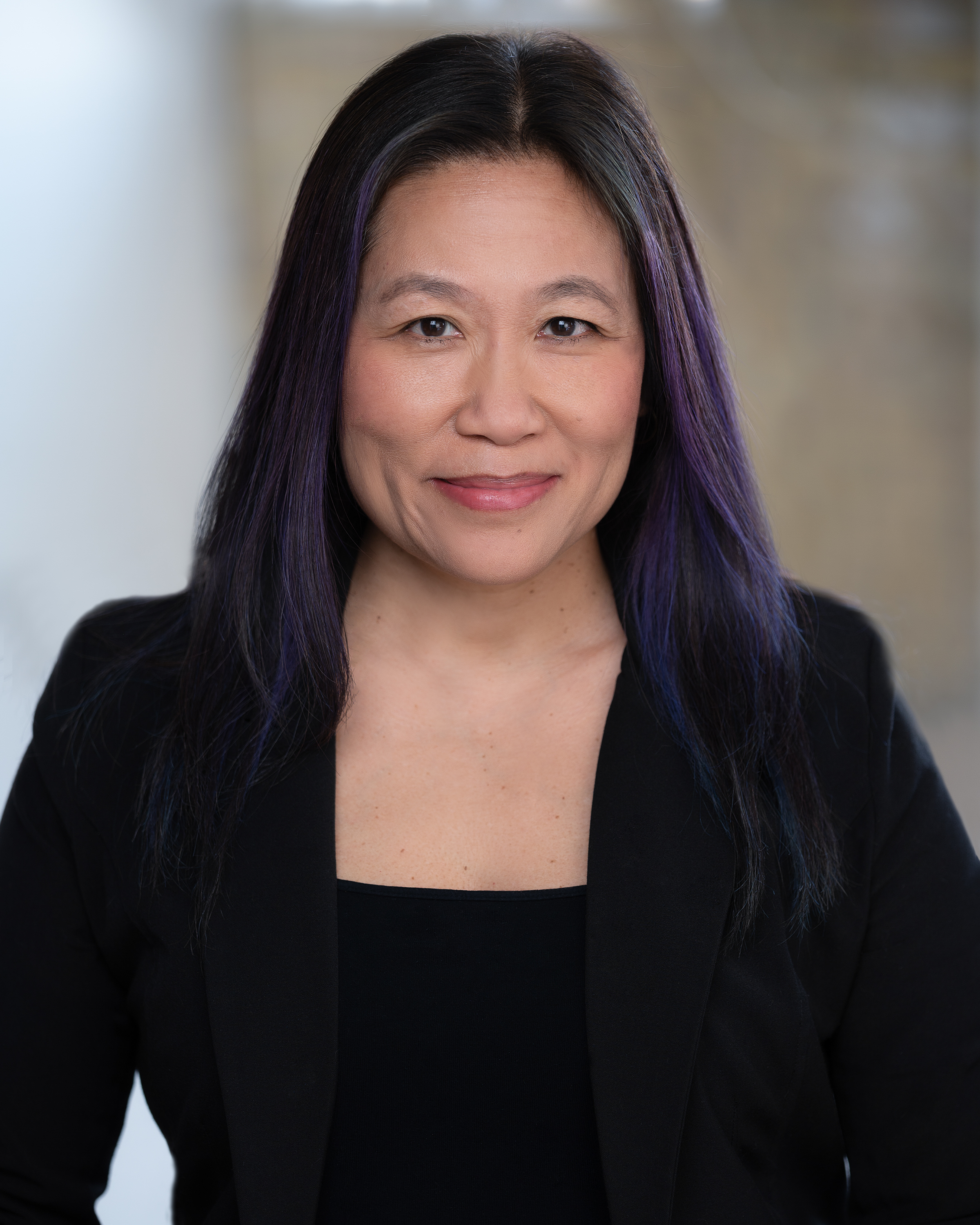
- Tung Crystal in 2024
- Born: Los Angeles
- Education: Cornell University, Columbia University School of the Arts
- Occupations: Theater director, actor
- Known for: Leadership in Asian American theater
- Spouse: Eric Crystal
- Website: lilytungcrystal.com

Lily Tung Crystal is a Chinese American actor, singer and theater director known for her leadership in Asian American theater.

== Early life and education ==
Tung Crystal is a Chinese American native of South Bay, Los Angeles. She studied at the American Conservatory Theater’s Studio Program, Cornell University, where she earned a degree in English, and the Columbia University School of the Arts.

== Career ==
During the 1990s, Tung Crystal worked as a freelance journalist in Shanghai, contributing arts and culture coverage to publications and outlets such as The New York Times, The Wall Street Journal, NBC News, and Public Radio International’s The World. She also launched Shanghai Talk, the city's first English-language magazine. While in China, she acted on stage, including as Amanda in Noël Coward’s Private Lives, and sang in the blues band Hot Tofu.

After returning to the United States, Tung Crystal worked in television and film, producing nonfiction programming for the Discovery Channel and appearing in the 2015 film Steve Jobs, while also obtaining certification as a leadership coach from the Hudson Institute and remaining active in theater.

Tung Crystal was a 2009 Theatre Bay Area Titan Award recipient, which led to the development of the Bay Area Asian American Actors Collective and, in 2010, to her co-founding the Ferocious Lotus Theater Company in the San Francisco Bay Area with actor Leon Goertzen; she served as its co-founding artistic director until Goertzen stepped down to serve as a casting director, after which Crystal was the only founding artistic director left.

In 2016, Tung Crystal was named to the YBCA 100, an annual list by the Yerba Buena Center for the Arts recognizing 100 people, organizations, and movements using arts and culture as a catalyst for change. From 2019 through to the 2024–2025 season, she was the artistic director of Theater Mu in Minneapolis-Saint Paul, serving in the company's first female co-leadership team alongside managing director Anh Thu T. Pham. In her role, she expanded the company's focus beyond Chinese American narratives to include more Southeast Asian, South Asian, and Southwest Asian American stories and artists. Under their joint leadership, the theater's budget grew from $650,000 to $1.3 million, and a fellowship program was established to nurture Asian American talent both onstage and backstage.

In 2024, Tung Crystal returned to Los Angeles to become artistic director of East West Players, the nation's oldest and largest Asian American theater company, ahead of its 60th anniversary season. She succeeded Snehal Desai, who left in 2023 to lead the Center Theatre Group, and joined managing director Eugene J. Hutchins in the company's newly implemented co-leadership model. Tung Crystal is the second woman to serve as artistic director in the company's history, following Nobu McCarthy’s tenure from 1989 to 1993.

== Personal life ==
Tung Crystal is married to musician Eric Crystal, a saxophonist and multi-instrumentalist for Boz Scaggs. The couple has one son.
