= List of Asian-American theatre companies =

This is a list of Asian-American theatre companies in the United States. The list includes performance groups and organizations whose programming focuses on Asian Pacific American identity, history, culture, community and experience, or whose members or artistic contributors are primarily Asian Pacific. In addition to theatre arts, list also includes sections for improvisational and sketch comedy groups, and dance performance companies.

== Theatre ==
=== Active ===
- Asian American Theater Company, San Francisco, 1973–
- Artists at Play, Los Angeles, 2011–
- A-Squared Theatre, Chicago, 2007–
- Bindlestiff Studio, San Francisco, 1989–
- Cedar Grove OnStage, Los Angeles, 2006–
- CHUANG Stage, Boston, 2018–
- CIRCA Pintig, Chicago, 1991–
- Community Asian Theatre of the Sierra (CATS), Nevada City/Greater Sacramento Area, 1994–
- Contemporary Asian Theater Scene (CATS), San Jose, California, 1995–
- East West Players, Los Angeles, 1965–
- Grateful Crane Ensemble, Pasadena, California, 2001–
- Kumu Kahua Theatre, Honolulu, 1971–
- Lapu the Coyote that Cares Theatre Company, University of California, Los Angeles, 1995–
- Ma-Yi Theatre Company, New York City, 1989–
- National Asian American Theater Company (NAATCO), New York City, 1989–
- Pan Asian Repertory Theatre, New York City, 1977–
- Pangea World Theatre, Minneapolis, 1995–
- Second Generation Productions, New York City, 1997–
- Pork Filled Productions, Seattle, 1998–
- Silk Road Rising, Chicago, 2002–
- SIS Productions, Seattle, Washington, 2000 -
- Stanford Asian American Theater Project, Stanford University, 1978–
- TeAda Productions, Santa Monica, California, 1994–
- Theater Mu, Minneapolis, 1992–
- Insight Colab Theatre (formerly: Theatre Esprit Asia) Denver, Colorado, 2013-
- Yun Theatre, Seattle, Washington, 2022-

=== Defunct ===
- Northwest Asian American Theatre, Seattle, 1972–2004
- Lodestone Theatre Ensemble, Los Angeles, 1995–2009
- Vampire Cowboys Theatre Company, New York City, 2000–2015

== Comedy ==
- Asian AF, Los Angeles/New York, 2016–
- Cold Tofu, Los Angeles, 1981–
- Porked Filled Productions (Pork Filled Players), Seattle, 1998–
- Room to Improv, Los Angeles, 2002–
- Stir Friday Night, Chicago, 1995–

== Dance ==
- Asian American Dance Theatre, New York City, 1974– (now Asian American Arts Centre)

== See also ==
- Asian American theatre
