= Nigel Bennett =

British actor

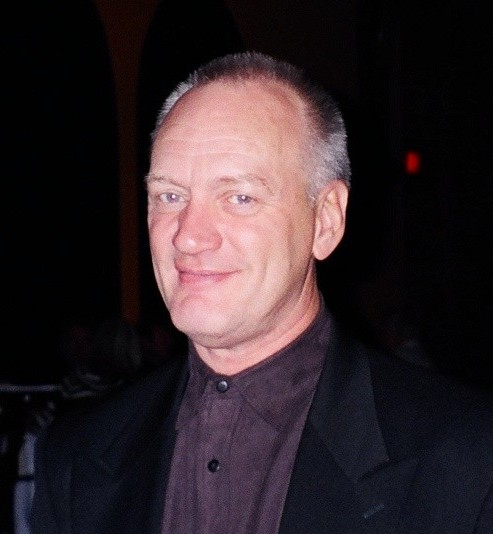
- Bennett in Ontario, 2004
- Born: 19 November 1949 (age 76); Wolverhampton, Staffordshire, England
- Education: Tettenhall College; University of Wales
- Occupation: Actor
- Years active: 1976–present
- Children: 4

Nigel Bennett (born 19 November 1949) is an English actor. He is best known for playing the vampire patriarch Lucien LaCroix in the television series Forever Knight, for which he won the Canadian Gemini Award for best supporting actor in a dramatic series. He also portrayed the villain Prince in the science fiction series Lexx, appearing in its third and fourth seasons.

== Early life and education ==
Bennett was born in Wolverhampton, Staffordshire. Bennett first started acting at eleven, playing a Roman citizen in a school production of Shaw's Antony and Cleopatra. He graduated from the University of Wales with a degree in theatre, and taught for a year and a half before beginning acting full-time. He had fifteen years of stage experience in Britain prior to moving to Canada. He attended Tettenhall College in Wolverhampton, Staffordshire.

== Career ==
He has been in a number of major films such as Murder at 1600, and The Skulls, and many other television series. He had recurring roles in Kung Fu: The Legend Continues, and Lexx.

Teaming up with writer P.N. Elrod, Bennett co-authored a series of acclaimed "James Bond with fangs" vampire adventure novels for Baen Books. The "Lord Richard, Vampire" trilogy includes Keeper of the King, His Father's Son, and Siege Perilous. He also contributed the short story "Wolf and Hound" to "Dracula's London," a collection edited by Elrod for Ace Science Fiction.

In 2006, he appeared in the Ken Finkleman miniseries At the Hotel, for which he was nominated for a Gemini Award.

Bennett keeps himself busy with additional film and television roles, stage work, convention and charity appearances. He was the artistic director of the Atlantic Theatre Festival in Wolfville, Nova Scotia, Canada, in 2006–07.

== Filmography ==
=== Film ===
Nigel Bennett film credits
Year	Title	Role	Ref.
1984	The Ninja Mission	Second helicopter pilot	
1988	The Outside Chance of Maximilian Glick	Derek Blackthorn	
1988	The Jeweller's Shop	Choreographer	
1990	Narrow Margin	Jack Wootton	
1990	The Star Turn	Geoffrey	
1992	Passage of the Heart	Alan Spencer	
1994	Back in Action	Kasajian	
1994	Paint Cans	Bryson Vautour	
1994	Legends of the Fall	Asgaard	
1994	Soft Deceit	Ed McCullough	
1995	Memory Run ^{D2V}	Sladecker	
1996	Darkman III: Die Darkman Die ^{D2V}	Nico	
1997	Murder at 1600	Burton Cash	
1998	Sanctuary	Sen. Stephen Macguire	
1998	All I Wanna Do	Harvey Sawyer	
1998	One Tough Cop	Insp. Bassie	
1999	Free Fall	Donald Caldwell	
1999	Top of the Food Chain	Michel O'Shea	
2000	The Skulls	Dr. Whitney	
2000	Rats and Rabbits (Beyond Mozambique)	Rocco	
2002	Phase IV	Sen. Richard Karnes	
2002	Cypher	Finster	
2004	Post Impact	Col. Preston Waters	
2006	A Bug and a Bag of Weed	Henry Tyler	
2007	Just Buried	Chief Knickle	
2008	Passage	Sir James Graham	
2010	The Corridor	Lee Shephard	
2010	Eternal Kiss	Dr. Polidori	
2016	Prisoner X	President Charles Turner	
2017	XXX: Return of Xander Cage	MI6 Control	
2017	The Shape of Water	Mihalkov	
2020	Christmas in the Rockies	Grandpa Sam	
2021	The Righteous	Graham	

=== Television ===
Nigel Bennett television credits
Year	Title	Role	Notes	Ref.
1977	Coronation Street	Colin Bailey	Episode #1.1749	
1981–1982	BBC2 Playhouse	Mr. Ring / Gary	3 episodes	
1983	Reilly, Ace of Spies	Port Official's Assistant	Episode: "Prelude to War"	
1984	Eh Brian! It's a Whopper	Weigher-in	Episode: "The Shape of Things to Come"	
1985	Gulag	Lubyanka Guard #1	Television film	
1986	Adderly	Monsieur Duval	Episode: "Nina Who?"	
1987	Night Heat	Kilpatrick	Episode: "Love You to Death"	
1987	Bay Coven	Mr. Bob Holden #1	Television film	
1987	A Child's Christmas in Wales	Father (past)	Television film	
1988	The Twilight Zone	Jim Sinclair	Episode: "Memories"	
1988	Alfred Hitchcock Presents	Griffin	Episode: "Survival of the Fittest"	
1989	Passion and Paradise	Lt. Johnny Douglas	Television film	
1989	Friday the 13th: The Series	Rausch / Karl Steiner	Episode: "The Butcher"	
1989–1994	Street Legal	Ron Harris, Andrew Michaels, Lukash	4 episodes	
1990	The Campbells	Edward Marchant	Episode: "Bird of Paradise"	
1990	T. and T.	Big Steve	Episode: "Wild Willy and the Waves"	
1990	Hitler's Daughter	Berger	Television film	
1990	E.N.G.	Phil Norwin	Episode: "Duffy, Bok, & Flann"	
1990–1991	Max Glick	Derek Blackthorn	3 episodes	
1990	Counterstrike	Kirkoff	Episode: "Dealbreaker"	
1991	Counterstrike	Stash Janic	Episode: "In the Blood"	
1991	Heritage Minutes	James Floyd	Episode: "Avro Arrow"	
1991	Tropical Heat	Hudson	Episode: "Big Brother Is Watching"	
1992	The Valour and the Horror	Kurt Meyer	Episode: "In Desperate Battle: Normandy 1944"	
1992	Beyond Reality	Dr. Bill Brandt	Episode: "Sins of the Father"	
1992	The Women of Windsor	Lawson	Television film	
1992	Secret Service	Cross	Episode: "Tattoo Arms and the Man"	
1992–1996	Forever Knight	Lacroix / Lucien LaCroix / Spirit Guide	69 episodes	
1993	Counterstrike	Quinton Jones	Episode: "French Twist"	
1993	The Hidden Room	Leon	Episode: "Transfigured Night"	
1993	Matrix	Dr. Anders	Episode: "Lapses in Memory"	
1993	Shattered Trust: The Shari Karney Story	N/A	Television film	
1993	Dieppe	Baillie-Grohman	Television film	
1993	Kung Fu: The Legend Continues	John Mitchell	Episode: "Straitjacket" (S1.E16)	
1994	Race to Freedom: The Underground Railroad	Levi Coffin	Television film	
1994	I Know My Son Is Alive	Atty. Derek Eisner	Television film	
1994	Ultimate Betrayal	Steven Rodgers	Television film	
1994	Model by Day	Nicholai	Television film	
1994	RoboCop	Granger	Episode: "The Human Factor"	
1994	Madonna: Innocence Lost	Bennett	Television film	
1994–1995	X-Men: The Animated Series	Mastermind / Jason Wyngarde, Master Mold	Voice, 5 episodes	
1994–1996	Hurricanes	Voices	7 episodes	
1995	Between Love and Honor	Large Man	Television film	
1995	Love and Betrayal: The Mia Farrow Story	John Farrow	Television film	
1995	The Shamrock Conspiracy	Dennis Malloy	Television film	
1995	Friends at Last	Teddy	Television film	
1995	Road to Avonlea	Enoch Cain	3 episodes	
1995	Harrison Bergeron	Dr. Eisenstock	Television film	
1995	Cagney & Lacey: The View Through the Glass Ceiling	Treasury Agent Whittlesy	Television film	
1995	Degree of Guilt	Victor Salinas	Television film	
1995	The New Adventures of Madeline	Voices	13 episodes	
1995	Lonesome Dove: The Series	Willis Logan	Episode: "The Alliance"	
1995	Where's the Money, Noreen?	Briscoll	Television film	
1995–1996	Action Man	Additional Voices	26 episodes	
1995, 1997	Kung Fu: The Legend Continues	Capt. Jack Lasher	2 episodes: "Banker's Hours" (S3.E16) & "May I Talk with You" (S4.E22)	
1996	Ed McBain's 87th Precinct: Ice	Brother Anthony	Television film	
1996	In the Fold	Cyno Commander	Television film	
1996	Gotti	Bruce Mouw	Television film	
1996	Her Desperate Choice	Raskin, Private Investigator	Television film	
1996	Taking the Falls	Samuel Wisotsky	Episode: "The Marrying Man"	
1996–1999	Psi Factor	Frank Elsinger	39 episodes	
1997	The Arrow	James Floyd	Miniseries	
1997	F/X: The Series	Agent Cal Judson	Episode: "Quicksilver"	
1997	Lies He Told	Commanding Officer	Television film	
1997	Any Mother's Son	Allen Schindler Sr.	Television film	
1997	Once a Thief	Nicholas Love	Episode: "Drive, She Said"	
1997	Newton: A Tale of Two Isaacs	Robert Hooke	Television film	
1997–1998	La Femme Nikita	Col. Egran Petrosian	2 episodes	
1998	Earth: Final Conflict	Major Raymond MacIntire	2 episodes	
1998	Honey, I Shrunk the Kids: The TV Show	U	Episode: "From Honey, with Love"	
1998	Rescuers: Stories of Courage: Two Couples	Kurt (segment "Aart and Johtje Vos")	Television film	
1998	Thanks of a Grateful Nation	Col. Sanitsky	Television film	
1998	Flood: A River's Rampage	Harry	Television film	
1998	Super Dave	Doctor Leo Thompson	Episode dated, October 21, 1998	
1998	Naked City: A Killer Christmas	Joseph Soloff	Television film	
1999	Vanished Without a Trace	Davis	Television film	
1999	Different	Russell Talmadge	Television film	
1999	Half a Dozen Babies	David McLaughlin	Television film	
1999	Total Recall 2070	Jake Esterhaus	Episode: "Eye Witness"	
1999	War of 1812	Winfield Scott	Miniseries; 4 episodes	
2000	The Crossing	Gen. Horatio Gates	Television film	
2000	Code Name Phoenix	Head of Marshall Service	Television film	
2000	Catch a Falling Star	Carter Hale	Television film	
2000	Anne of Green Gables: The Continuing Story	Fergus Keegan	2 episodes	
2000	Code Name: Eternity	Koom	Episode: "The Watery Grave"	
2000	The Secret Adventures of Jules Verne	Jacomb Hyde	Episode: "The Black Glove of Melchizedek"	
2000	The Chippendales Murder	Frank Ballard	Television film	
2000	Canada: A People's History	Guy Carleton / Additional Voices	2 episodes	
2000	Relic Hunter	Professor Alaine Richarde	Episode: "Cross of Voodoo"	
2000–2002	Lexx	Prince / Isambard Prince / White King	22 episodes	
2001	Dark Realm	Patrick Lawless	Episode: "Emma's Boy"	
2001	All Souls	Barney Wheelock	Episode: "One Step Closer to Roger"	
2001	A Town Without Christmas	Literary Agent	Television film	
2002	Mentors	Alan Pinkerton	Episode: "The Private Eyes"	
2002	The Pilot's Wife	Dick Somers	Television film	
2002	Too Young to Be a Dad	Dr. Howell	Television film	
2002	Widows	Harry Rawlins	Miniseries; 4 episodes	
2002	The Scream Team	Warner MacDonald	Television film	
2002	Interceptor Force 2	Jack Bavaro	Television film	
2002	Heart of a Stranger	Stan	Television film	
2003	Liocracy	Jerry Wright	Episode: "Say Uncle"	
2003	Do or Die	Ethan Grant	Television film	
2003	Mutant X	John Warren	Episode: "Final Judgement"	
2003	Martha, Inc.: The Story of Martha Stewart	Rat Bastard	Television film	
2003	Sex and the Single Mom	Nick Gradwell	Television film	
2003	Andromeda	Paroo	Episode: "Answers Given to Questions Never Asked"	
2003	Rush of Fear	Sheriff Lathrop	Television film	
2003	Starhunter	Roan Gerick	Episode: "Painless"	
2003	Shattered City: The Halifax Explosion	Captain From	2 episodes	
2004	Reversible Errors	Talmadge Loman	Television film	
2004	Phantom Force	Jack Bavaro	Television film	
2004	Plain Truth	Jeremy Whitmore	Television film	
2005	Beach Girls	Sam Emerson	5 episodes	
2005	The Hunt for the BTK Killer	Detective Zilinski	Television film	
2005	Trudeau II: Maverick in the Making	Brébeuf Professor	Television film	
2006	At the Hotel	Jacob	6 episodes	
2006	Fatal Trust	Samuel Ryder	Television film	
2006	The State Within	Charles Macintyre	6 episodes	
2007	Jesse Stone: Sea Change	Harrison Pendleton	Television film	
2007	Matters of Life and Dating	Errol Sager	Television film	
2008	Bridal Fever	Sam Panofsky	Television film	
2008	The Summit	Ian Greene	2 episodes	
2008	Burn Up	Jerry	Episode #1.1	
2008–2010	The Border	Andrew Mannering	16 episodes	
2009	G-Spot	Doctor	Episode: "Handicap Hummer"	
2009	Nova	Charles Lyell	Episode: "Darwin's Darkest Hour"	
2009	Sea Wolf	Henderson	Episode #1.1	
2011	The Kennedys	Henderson	Episode: "Bobby's War"	
2011–2021	Murdoch Mysteries	Inspector Giles/Chief Constable Giles	13 episodes	
2013	Time of Death	Robert Loring	Television film	
2014	Rookie Blue	Dr. Howard	2 episodes	
2015	Saving Hope	Dr. Burt Goran	Episode: "Trading Places"	
2015	Orphan Black	Kassov	Episode: "Insolvent Phantom of Tomorrow"	
2015–2016	The Strain	Dr. Draverhaven	2 episodes	
2016	Valentine Ever After	Judge Joe Emmett	Television film	
2016	Dark Matter	Larcan Tanner	2 episodes	
2018	Designated Survivor	Alton Prast	Episode: "Original Sin"	
2018	Frankie Drake Mysteries	Mr. Frost	Episode: "Now You See Her"	
2019	Coroner	Bryan Da Silva	4 episodes	
2019	Tin Star	Mr. Quiring	5 episodes	
2019	V Wars	Emil Lansing	Episode: "Down with the Sickness"	
2020	A Christmas Exchange	Garret / Bartender	Television film	
2021	Jupiter's Legacy	Dr. Jack Hobbs	Episode: "What's the Use"	

== See also ==
- List of residents of Wolverhampton
