= Asian-American theater =

Asian-American theatrical performance and history

Asian American theater refers to theater written, directed or acted by Asian Americans. From initial efforts by four theater companies in the 1960s, Asian-American theater has grown to around forty groups today. Early productions often had Asian themes or settings; and "yellowface" was a common medium for displaying the perceived exoticism of the East in American performance. With the growing establishment of second-generation Asian-Americans in the 21st century, it is becoming more common today to see Asian-Americans in roles that defy historical stereotypes in the United States.

== Background ==
Asian-American theater emerged in the 1960s and the 1970s with the foundation of four theater companies: East West Players in Los Angeles, Asian American Theatre Workshop (later renamed Asian American Theater Company) in San Francisco, Theatrical Ensemble of Asians (later renamed Northwest Asian American Theatre) in Seattle, and Pan Asian Repertory Theatre in New York City. The Northwest Asian American Theatre was one of the first in the Pacific Northwest. The four companies have provided the resources and opportunities to actors, writers, directors, designers, and producers to pursue and define Asian-American theater for over five decades. By the end of the 1990s, the number of Asian-American theater companies and performance groups grew to about forty. In addition, such companies helped integrate Asian-Americans into many popular theater companies by normalizing Asian actors. Asian-American plays have appeared on Broadway and regional theaters and have received major awards both nationally and internationally. Asian-American actors have used Asian-American theater companies as their artistic bases while pursuing careers in the mainstream theater, film and television. Alternative forms of theater and performance such as multimedia performance, solo performance and spoken word have also shaped Asian-American theater. In the beginning, participants of Asian-American theater were mostly of East Asian descent, but in the 1990s and the 21st century, more artists of South Asian and Southeast Asian backgrounds have joined the community and have made Asian-American theater one of the fastest growing and changing sectors in American theater.

== Asian-American theater companies ==
East West Players (EWP) was founded in 1965 by a group of actors who wanted to fight racism in the entertainment industry by creating non-stereotypical roles for Asian Americans. Led by the Japanese-American actor Mako, the actors at EWP first saw theater as a venue to showcase their talent for television and film producers and directors, but by the early 1970s, the EWP began to actively sponsor original plays by Asian Americans. Frank Chin, who founded the Asian American theater Workshop, argued that Asian-American actors needed Asian-American playwrights to create believable roles and to end dependence on the mainstream acting industry. Theatrical Ensemble of Asians (TEA) began in 1974 on the campus of the University of Washington, and after the founding students graduated, moved into a theater in the International District, renaming themselves the Asian Exclusion Act. The theater group moved around several locations before finding a home at the Theatre Off Jackson. It was late renamed again as the Northwest Asian American Theatre (NWAAT).

In addition to acting and playwriting, NWAAT emphasized community activism and became a cultural center for Asian Americans in Seattle; many of the plays they performed were directly targeted at expressing the painful history of discrimination Asian-Americans in America suffered after the Chinese Exclusion Act. Pan Asian Repertory Theatre (Pan Asian Rep), on the other hand, emerged as part of off-off-Broadway theater in 1978. Founded by Tisa Chang, Pan Asian Rep became the representative Asian-American theatre company in New York City and introduced Asian-American plays to the East Coast audiences. In the 1980s and 1990s, Asian-American theater companies were founded with more diverse purposes and styles. Companies such as Ma-Yi Theater Company (New York City) focus on producing new, original plays, as did the now-defunct Lodestone Theatre Ensemble (Los Angeles, 1999-2009). Others companies' agendas departed greatly from the original four: National Asian American Theatre Company (NAATCO) in New York City, for instance, stages canonized Western plays with all Asian cast and Theater Mu in Saint Paul incorporates Asian theatrical styles to specifically cater to local audiences.

Now, there are many Asian American theater companies, located in 13 states, including Oregon and Texas. In New York City, alone, 12 theater companies have slowly become more recognized and featured.

== Asian-American actors ==
American theater in the 1950s was dominated by popular Broadway shows that featured Asian characters and settings, and shows such as The King and I and Flower Drum Song provided employment to a number of "Oriental" actors. However, many roles were blatantly stereotypical and racist and many major roles were cast with white actors with facial makeup resembling an "Oriental". The popularity of Asian themes in Broadway shows did not continue through the 1960s, and "Oriental" actors found themselves unemployed in large numbers. While they were out of work, they observed white actors getting cast in Asian roles. "Oriental" actors began to protest this practice by creating activist organizations and creating work for themselves. The term "Asian-American actor" emerged in the late 1960s when the Asian American movement challenged the racist history of the label "Oriental." By the 1970s, Asian-American actors were well organized in their fight for jobs and positive images for Asians. In New York, an activist group called Oriental Actors of America regularly protested openings of shows with white actors playing Asians. In Los Angeles, East West Players became the most visible venue for Asian-American actors to find acting employment and to participate in activism. The company's proximity to Hollywood attracted many ambitious and talented Asian-American actors to Los Angeles. By the mid-1990s, over 75% of all Asian-American actors had acted on the stage of EWP.

In the early 1990s, the controversy over the musical Miss Saigon surfaced when Asian-American actors protested the casting of the British actor Jonathan Pryce for the role of the half-Vietnamese Engineer in the Broadway production of the musical. The protest was led by many prominent Asian-American theater artists, including actor BD Wong, the artistic director of Pan Asian Rep, Tisa Chang, and the playwright David Henry Hwang. Asian-American actors initially lost their fight when the musical opened on Broadway with Pryce, but in the long run, the controversy generated many positive aftereffects for Asian-American actors. The musical's ten-year run on Broadway employed an unprecedented number of Asian-American actors, and the role of the Engineer was subsequently cast with Asian-American actors.

Asian Americans have won the fight for employment, and while some roles for them stereotype those of Asian descent, Asian Americans are increasingly winning roles that respect and tolerate Asian Americans from the majority of producers who are realizing the reality of racial bigotry and ignorance that brings hostility and degradation to those oppressed.

== Asian-American playwrights ==
Before the 1960s, Asian-American plays were virtually non-existent, but various initiatives, including East West Players' playwriting contest, encouraged Asian-American writers to adapt their short stories and novels into plays and to write original plays. The first wave of Asian-American playwrights included Wakako Yamauchi, Momoko Iko, Edward Sakamoto, Hiroshi Kashiwagi, and Frank Chin. Common themes in plays by first wave writers were Asian-American history, generational conflict, cultural identity, cultural nationalism, and family history. In 1972, Frank Chin's The Chickencoop Chinaman became the first Asian-American play to be produced in New York City, and since then, Chin has become a major spokesperson for Asian-American playwriting. He founded the Asian American Theatre Workshop in San Francisco to promote original playwriting by Asian Americans. The most commercially successful Asian-American play was David Henry Hwang's play M. Butterfly, which became the first Asian-American play to be produced on Broadway and won the Tony Award for Best Play in 1988. The success of M. Butterfly created a national interest in Asian-American plays, and regional theater companies around the country began to produce plays by Hwang and other second wave Asian-American writers such as Philip Kan Gotanda and Velina Hasu Houston. Such interest also promoted the publication of first anthologies of Asian-American plays in the early 1990s. The mainstreaming of Asian-American plays increased with works by third wave writers such as Diana Son, Sung Rno, Han Ong, Chay Yew, Rick Shiomi, and Ralph Peña. These third wave writers felt that race and ethnicity were mere jumping off point in addressing multifaceted experiences of being an Asian American and wrote about any topic that interested them. All three waves of Asian American playwrights continue to produce works that define not only Asian-American theater, but also American theater and global theater.

== Alternative theater and performance ==
One of the earliest pioneers of interdisciplinary theater and performance is Ping Chong. He is a seminal figure in the integration of visual arts, media, sound design, dance, mime, and spectacle into contemporary theater. LAZARUS, his 1st production, premiered in NYC in 1972. Another form of alternative theater is solo performance. Often written, directed, and acted by one performer, solo performance has provided many Asian-American artists with the opportunity to voice their experiences. Solo performers, such as Dan Kwong, Denise Uyehara, Jude Narita, and Lane Nishikawa, have toured with their shows and have introduced Asian-American theater to audiences in all parts of the country. Group performances have also toured, especially to colleges and universities. Often comedic, group performances, such as Slant Performance Group and the 18 Mighty Mountain Warriors, have been popular amongst college students, many of whom saw Asian-American performers onstage for the first time. Recently, spoken word groups have become the newest form of Asian-American theater and performance.

== The Consortium of Asian American Theaters & Artists (CAATA) ==
Formerly called the Asian-American Theatre Conference and Festival, the consortium's mission is to advance the field of Asian American theater through a national network of organizations and artists. In June 2006, Next Big Bang: The First Asian-American Theatre Conference was held in Los Angeles, spearheaded by East West Players. It was followed in June 2007 with the first ever National Asian American Theatre Festival, held in New York City. The two-week festival was co-organized by Pan Asian Rep, Ma-Yi Theater and NAATCO. From June 11 – June 24, work from more than 35 emerging and established artists and groups from across the nation was presented in over 13 venues around New York City's boroughs. Shaping Our Voice & Vision: the 2nd National Asian American Theater Conference took place June 5–7, 2008, in Minneapolis, co-hosted by Mu Performing Arts and Pangea World Theater. Conferences and Festivals have since been hosted in New York, Los Angeles, Philadelphia, and Ashland, Oregon. The most recent combined Conference and Festival (ConFest) was held in Chicago from August 11–19, 2018, with its theme on revolutionary acts. This theme engaged people in passionate dialogue about social injustice, inequity and active resistance in American culture and helped theater practitioners consider what they can do about it.

== See also ==
- List of Asian-American theatre companies
- Asian Americans in arts and entertainment
- Portrayal of East Asians in American film and theater
