= Rick Shiomi =

Japanese-Canadian playwright, stage director, artistic director and taiko artist

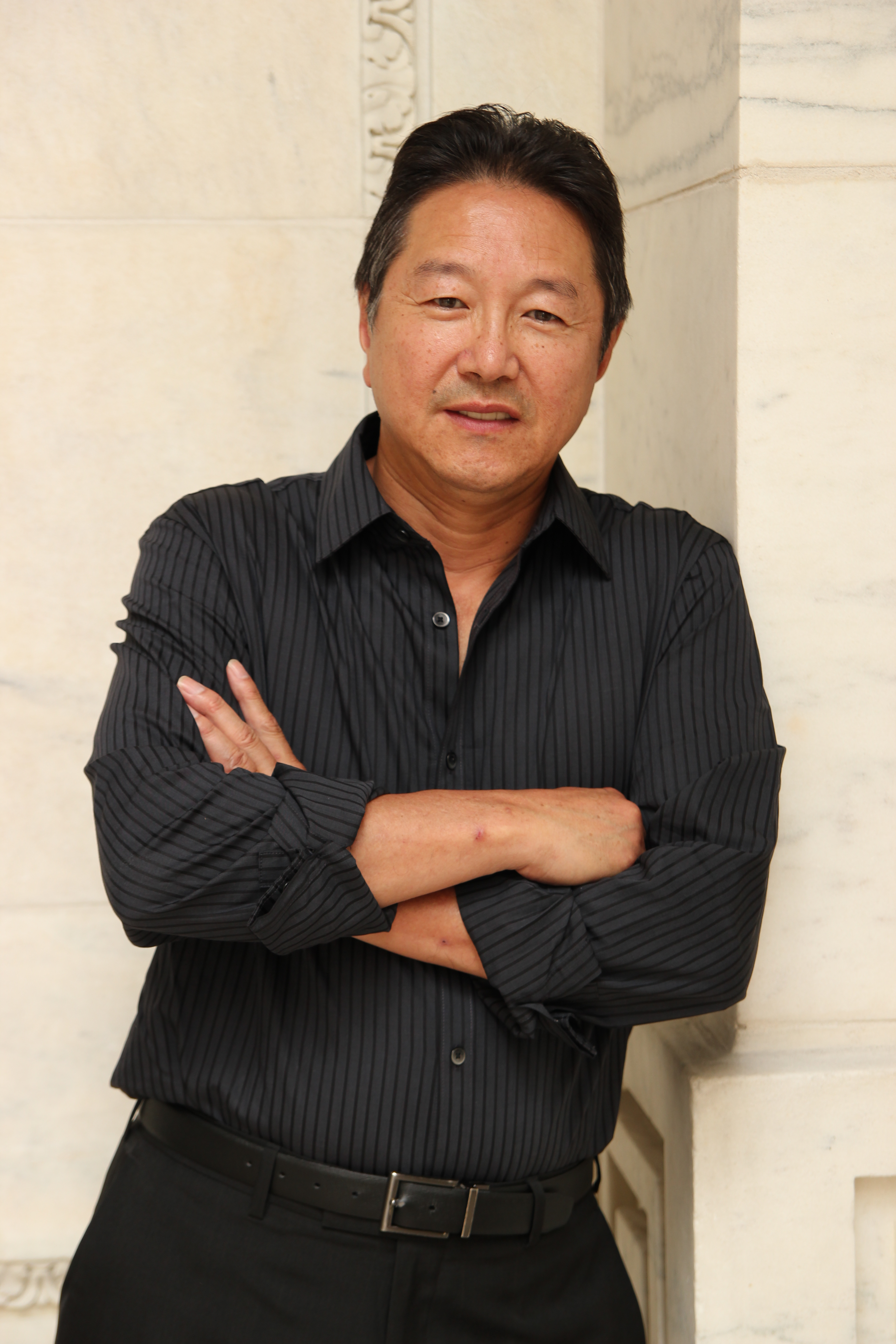
- Playwright Rick Shiomi in New York in 2011
- Born: Rickey Allan Shiomi; May 25, 1947 (age 79); Toronto, Ontario, Canada
- Education: University of Toronto, Simon Fraser University
- Occupations: Playwright, artistic director, theater director
- Writing career
- Pen name: R. A. Shiomi
- Period: 1982–present
- Genre: Theater
- Subject: Asian American experience
- Notable work: Yellow Fever
- Website: fullcircletheatermn.org muperformingarts.org rickshiomi.com

Rick Shiomi (born May 25, 1947) is a Japanese Canadian playwright, stage director, artistic director and taiko artist. Considered a major player in the Asian American/Canadian theatre movement, he is best known for his groundbreaking play Yellow Fever, which earned him the Bay Area Theater Circle Critics Award and “Bernie” Award. Over the last couple decades, Shiomi has also become an artistic and stage director. He directed the world premiere of the play Caught by Christopher Chen for which he received the Philadelphia Barrymore Award Nomination for Outstanding Direction. He is currently the Co-Artistic Director of Full Circle Theater Company located in St. Paul, Minnesota.

== Career ==
Shiomi's Yellow Fever premiered at the Asian American Theater Company in 1982, winning awards, and leading to Pan Asian Repertory Theatre's New York production, garnering rave reviews in the New York Times and New Yorker. Yellow Fever is now considered a mainstay of the Asian American playwriting canon, and Shiomi is now the author of over twenty plays. As a stage director, he has discovered remarkable new plays and re-imagined classics in the context of the Asian American experience. He directed the world premiere of Caught, by Christopher Chen, at InterAct Theatre for which he received a Barrymore Award Nomination for Outstanding Direction and the play received the Outstanding New Play Award. (Caught went on to many other productions across the country, winning several awards including the 2013 Obie for Best New Play for its NYC production.) Shiomi's re-imagining of The Mikado, reset in Edwardian England, attracted considerable national interest and press coverage, with Asian American actors playing many English lead characters, wiping out all the problematic Asian stereotypes. Shiomi has staged over forty productions for theater companies across North America, and he re-staged Caught for Full Circle Theater at the Guthrie Theater's Dowling Studio in May/June 2019.

Shiomi has had a strong impact on Asian American theater in other significant ways. A co-founder of Mu Performing Arts in Minnesota in 1992, he was artistic director from 1993 to 2013, developing Mu into a major Asian American theater company in the US. At Mu he mentored hundreds of artists, and produced scores of world premieres as well as Asian American classics. Shiomi was a founding member of CAATA, the Consortium of Asian American Theaters and Artists, the national service organization for Asian American theaters and artists. Recognition for his work includes the McKnight Distinguished Artist Award, the Ivey Award For Lifetime Achievement, and the Sally Ordway Irvine Award for Vision. Since leaving Mu in 2014 to pursue other artistic interests, he has directed for InterAct Theater in Philadelphia, and co-founded Full Circle Theater Company in Minneapolis/St. Paul, where he serves as Co-Artistic Director and continues to expand his artistic horizons with Full Circle's mission of multiracial theater focusing on equity, diversity, and inclusion. And in 2018, he completed a multi-year Doris Duke Charitable Foundation project in Philadelphia in its Building Demand for the Arts program (implementation round) working closely with InterAct Theatre to build an Asian American theater presence in Philadelphia. His new play, Fire In The New World, was work-shopped in Tokyo in 2019.

=== Playwright ===
Rick Shiomi began his theater career in San Francisco, California at the Asian American Theater Company where his first play Yellow Fever was produced in 1982, for which he received the 1982 Bay Area Theater Circle Critics Award and a “Bernie” for new play from the San Francisco Chronicle. He later moved to New York City where the play was produced by the Pan Asian Repertory Theatre and then had a successful off-Broadway run. The Pan Asian Repertory Theatre produced several of his plays, including a prequel to Yellow Fever titled Rosie's Cafe and a sequel, Once is Never Enough, co-authored with Marc Hayashi and Lane Kiyomi Nishikawa.

Yellow Fever remains a classic in the canon of the Asian American/Canadian theatre movement. His other important early works include Rosie's Cafe, Play Ball, and Uncle Tadao.

Play Ball was produced at Pan Asian Repertory and Uncle Tadao was produced at both East West Players in Los Angeles and the Asian American Theater Company. Rosie's Cafe has been toured across Canada and the United States. Both Rosie’s Cafe and Yellow Fever have been produced in Japanese (translations by Toyoshi Yoshihara) in Tokyo, Japan.

From 1993 to 2013 Shiomi wrote a number of plays for Mu Performing Arts while he was Artistic Director there. The first of these was Mask Dance, based upon the stories of young Korean adoptees who were early participants in the company. Mask Dance incorporated a traditional performance form, Korean mask dance, into a contemporary Asian American story. Other plays written in this style were Song of the Pipa and The Tale of the Dancing Crane. Shiomi works almost entirely behind the scenes, or behind a taiko drum, but with the play The Tale of the Dancing Crane, he took center stage as an actor. He shared a traditional Japanese story of losing one precious thing to find something better and combined it with his own story of discovering taiko. Shiomi co-wrote the play The Walleye Kid with Sundraya Kase, which he adapted from a traditional Japanese fable titled Peach Boy, and the play was produced in 1999. The original story tells of a Japanese child who is found inside a peach and adopted by the old couple that discovered him. In The Walleye Kid, Shiomi has moved the setting from the warmer climate of Japan to the icy winters of Minnesota where the baby emerges from a giant Walleye. In this play, he explores what Asian, specifically Korean, adoptees have experienced as they adapt to life in America. Walleye Kid, The Musical, which Shiomi adapted from the play, was most recently produced in 2008 by Mu Performing Arts at the McKnight Theatre of the Ordway Center for the Performing Arts. In 2002, he co-authored Hmong Tiger Tales with Cha Yang, which was co-produced at the Weyerhaeuser Auditorium by Mu Performing Arts and St. Paul's Steppingstone Theatre For Youth.

=== Mu Performing Arts ===
While in Minnesota as a visiting lecturer, Shiomi found an emerging Asian American community and a well-developed general theater scene. He also met his future wife Martha Johnson who, along with others, helped him co-found Theater Mu. He served as the Artistic Director there for twenty years. During that time he developed the company from an annual budget of $20,000 to over $500,000 and was involved in the development of many emerging Asian American theater artists. He selected and produced the early plays of such prominent national playwrights as Lauren Yee, Julia Cho and Michael Golamco and local writers as Katie Ka Vang, Sun Mee Chomet, Katie Hae Leo and May Lee Yang. He also oversaw the development of many actors such as Eric Sharp, Sherwin Resurreccion, Katie Bradley, Sara Ochas and Kurt Kwan who now work regularly at theaters in the Twin Cities.

In 1997 Shiomi founded Mu Daiko, and was the artistic director, lead instructor, composer and player through 2010. The taiko group was so successful that in early 2000s the name Theater Mu was changed to Mu Performing Arts to recognize the fact of the two performing groups within the one company. Shiomi retired from active taiko performing in 2010, and the leadership of Mu Daiko was taken over by Iris Shiraishi, one of Shiomi's first students, and then in 2015 by Jennifer Weir. In 2017 the two groups, Theater Mu and Mu Daiko, officially separated, and Mu Daiko became a new entity, Ensō Daiko part of TaikoArts Midwest under the leadership of Jennifer Weir.

=== Stage director ===
Shiomi began to develop his unique directorial approach during his first decade as artistic director of Mu Performing Arts when he directed several new, experimental works derived from deep personal narratives of the Asian American experience that were combined with traditional dance, music, or theater methods from related root Asian cultures. He used this unique directing approach with such original works as Mask Dance (1993), combining personal stories of Korean adoptees in America with traditional Korean mask dance; or in Song of the Pipa (2000), combining master Chinese pipa player Gao Hong's wrenching immigrant story with her magnificent live performance as a musician.

This work as stage director at Mu moved forward when Shiomi expanded this approach with his re-imagining of classic western works from an Asian American perspective. This began in 2006 with his acclaimed re-envisioning of Shakespeare's A Midsummer Night’s Dream set in 19th Century Japan and featuring a mostly Asian American cast. For the production all characters in the fairy world performed in Korean mask dance style, wearing traditional Korean costume.

Shiomi has continued with this innovative approach of re-envisioning western classics from an Asian American perspective. In 2012 he directed Sondheim's musical Into The Woods setting it in Japanese, Korean, Hmong, and Filipino magical folk tale worlds. In 2013 he directed a revolutionary version of Gilbert and Sullivan's The Mikado (co-produced by Skylark Opera), setting it in Edwardian England instead of Japan, and casting Asian American actors (as English men/women) in most of the lead roles, turning the racist depiction of Japanese on its head and receiving national coverage. In 2014 he directed Sondheim's A Little Night Music, using color conscious casting to reframe the musical with an Asian American cast. And he has directed two David Henry Hwang plays, Yellow Face and Hwang's revision of Flower Drum Song by Rodgers and Hammerstein.

Since leaving Mu Performing Arts in 2014, Shiomi has continued his important work as a director: In 2014 he directed the world premiere of Caught by Christopher Chen, at InterAct Theatre, Philadelphia, for which he received the Philadelphia Barrymore Award Nomination for Outstanding Direction. In 2015/16, Shiomi directed Theater: A Sacred Passage for the new theater company he has co-founded, Full Circle Theater. This original/devised performance piece presents the powerful personal narratives of five racially diverse Full Circle theater artists and how they discovered their passion to pursue theater as a profession. In 2017 Shiomi directed: You For Me For You by Mia Chung, at InterAct Theatre, Philadelphia. In 2017 he co-directed 365 Days/365 Plays by Suzan Lori Parks for Full Circle, which received year-end accolades from several media reviewers.

Shiomi has also directed at the Asian American Theater Company in San Francisco, InterAct Theatre in Philadelphia, The Bloomington Civic Theatre in Minnesota, St. Paul's SteppingStone Theatre for Youth, and Theatre Esprit Asia in Denver.

=== Taiko artist and Mu Daiko ===
Shiomi is also an award-winning taiko artist, who began playing in 1979 as a member of Katari Taiko in Vancouver, British Columbia. In the 1980s, he studied with Grandmaster Seiichi Tanaka of the San Francisco Taiko Dojo, performing with several groups, including Soh Daiko of New York (as a guest artist) and Wasabi Taiko in Toronto. In 1997, at the behest of actors at Mu Performing Arts, he began teaching taiko, forming Mu Daiko, a taiko drumming ensemble, that same year. Under his leadership, Mu Daiko evolved into a regular troupe, performing one mainstage production a season, and over the years developed an extensive outreach and educational program with over a hundred engagements annually. In 2005, Mu Daiko performed at the mainstage performance, Taiko Jam, at the National Taiko Conference in Los Angeles. As lead player and composer for Mu Daiko for more than ten years, Shiomi garnered numerous awards including a 1998 MN State Arts Board Cultural Collaborations Award for taiko, a drumming collaboration with Ragamala Music and Dance Theater; a 2002 Paddle and Drum Composition Award for "Chrysanthemum Dawn"; and a 2004 Paddle and Drum Composition Award for "Kiyomizu Cascade". In 2010, he retired from regular participation in the Mu Daiko, which is now led by Jennifer Weir.

=== Recently published work ===
As artistic director of Mu Performing Arts, Shiomi oversaw the development of new plays including Ching Chong Chinaman by Lauren Yee, Cowboy Versus Samurai by Michael Golamco, Happy Valley by Aurorae Khoo, Bahala Na by Clarence Coo, Asiamesia by Sun Mee Chomet, and xxx by Katie Ka Vang. He is a co-editor of Asian American Plays for a New Generation published by Temple University Press in June 2011. In this anthology of new plays by Asian American playwrights, Mu Performing Arts developed and produced the world premiere of six of the seven featured.

== Awards and honors ==
2017 Philadelphia Barrymore Award Recommendation, Stage Director
For You For Me For You, by Mia Chung

2017 Western Literary Association, Distinguished Achievement Award

2016 Doris Duke Charitable Foundation, Building Demand For The Arts, Implementation Round Grant
To develop Asian American theater artists and audiences in Philadelphia. Grant ran through June 2018.

2015 McKnight Foundation Distinguished Artist Award
Recognizes individual Minnesota artists who have made significant contributions to the quality of the state's cultural life. Included a $50,000 cash award.

2015 Philadelphia Barrymore Award Nomination for Outstanding Direction
For the world premiere production of Caught by Christopher Chen, October 2014

2014 Doris Duke Charitable Foundation, Building Demand For The Arts, Exploration Round Grant
To develop Asian American theater artists and audiences in Philadelphia.

2012 Ivey Award for Lifetime Achievement
Twin Cities professional theater award honoring lifetime achievement

2010 Opening Panelist Speaker for Genesis
The First Asian Canadian Theater Conference, Toronto, Canada

2007 Sally Ordway Irvine Award for Vision
Awarded by the Ordway Center for the Performing Arts in recognition of work with Mu Performing Arts

2002 MN State Council for Asian Pacific Minnesotans Award for Leadership
An award honoring outstanding Asian Pacific heritage individuals who have given generously of their time and energy to serving and improving the Asian Pacific Minnesotan community

1990 Ruby Schaar Yoshino Playwriting Award
Awarded for Uncle Tadao

1983 Bay Area Theater Circle Critics Award and “Bernie” Award
For world premiere of Yellow Fever in March, 1982

Selected play productions

Yellow Fever

2018 Haisho Theatre Company Tokyo Japan (March 2018)

2013 Mu Performing Arts, at Dowling Studio of Guthrie Theater

2004 Ryuzanji Theatre Company, Tokyo Japan

1995 Pan Asian Repertory Theatre, NYC (revival)

1982/83 Pan Asian Repertory Theatre, NYC (Off-Broadway)

1983 CanAsian Artists, at Canadian Stage, Toronto, Canada

1983 East West Players, LA

1982 Asian American Theater Company, San Francisco

Rosie's Cafe

2011 Haisho Theatre Company in Tokyo, Japan

1989 Firehall Theatre, Vancouver, Canada

1988 Asian American Theater Company, San Francisco

1987 Pan Asian Repertory Company, NYC

Mask Dance

1995 Theater Mu at Southern Theater, Minneapolis MN

1993 Theater Mu at Southern Theater, Minneapolis MN

Walleye Kid (co-authored with Sundraya Kase)

2008 Mu Performing Arts at the McKnight Theater, Ordway Center For The Performing Arts, St. Paul, MN

Walley Kid The Musical

Mu Performing Arts at the McKnight Theater, Ordway Center For The Performing Arts, St. Paul, MN

Song of the Pipa

2000 Theater Mu, The Southern Theater, Minneapolis, MN

Play Ball

1988 Pan Asian Repertory Theatre Company, NYC

Uncle Tadao

1992 East West Players, Los Angeles & Asian American Theater Company, San Francisco

== Early life ==
Shiomi's parents were among the many Canadians of Japanese descent who were forced into internment camps during World War II. They had previously lived in Vancouver, British Columbia. They moved to Toronto after their release where their son, Rickey Allan Shiomi, was born in 1947. Shiomi was raised in Toronto and graduated from the University of Toronto with a degree in history in 1970.

After graduation he continued his education in British Columbia, receiving a teaching diploma from Simon Fraser University. He then went on to travel the world, teaching in Japan and Hong Kong for one year before returning home to Canada where he became a prominent member of the Japanese Canadian community. One of the projects he was involved with was organizing the Powell Street Festival. He also edited a film titled The First 100 Years which was based on a slide show, and designed to teach children about Japanese Canadian history. An active member of the Japanese Canadian Citizen's Association, Shiomi was an editor of Inalienable Rice: A Chinese & Japanese Canadian Anthology.

During his time in Vancouver, Shiomi met up with playwrights David Henry Hwang and Philip Kan Gotanda. Gotanda read one of Shiomi's short stories about a Japanese Canadian detective and suggested he submit the story for adaptation to the stage to the Asian American Theater Workshop in San Francisco. Shiomi followed Gotanda's advice and wrote Yellow Fever.

== Bibliography ==
=== Plays ===
- 1982 Yellow Fever
- 1984 Once is Never Enough
- 1987 Rosie's Cafe
- 1988 Play Ball
- 1992 Uncle Tadao
- 1998 The Walleye Kid
- 1999 Tales of the Starfruit Tree
- 1999 Tales of the Dancing Crane
- 2000 Song of the Pipa
- 2002 Tiger Tales (with Cha Yang)
- 2006 Filipino Hearts
- 2018 Fire In The New World (in development)

=== Multimedia credits ===
Story editor and staff writer for Canadian television series E.N.G., produced by Alliance on CTV

- Images of the First Hundred Years, Powell Street Revue, 1980 (documentary, 11 min.)
- Dance to Remember (as writer), CBC, Inside Stories, 1991 (30 min.)

=== Other ===
- Garrick Chu, Sean Gunn, Paul Yee, Ken Shikaze, Linda Uyehara Hoffman, Rick Shiomi, eds.; Inalienable Rice: A Chinese & Japanese Canadian Anthology Powell Street Revue & The Chinese Canadian Writers Workshop. 83 pp.
- Srikanth, Rajini and Esther Yae Iwanaga; Bold words: a century of Asian American writing, Rutgers University Press, 2001, ISBN 0-8135-2966-2
- Josephine Lee, Don Eitel and R.A. Shiomi, eds.; Asian American Plays for a New Generation, Temple University Press, 2011, ISBN 1-4399-0515-0
