= Yellow Fever (play) =

Play by R. A. Shiomi

- Original language: English
- Written by: R. A. Shiomi
- Characters: Sam Shikaze
- Subject: Japanese Canadian Culture
- Genre: Comedy, Mystery, Parody
- Setting: Powell Street in Vancouver, CAN in the early 1970s

Premiere
- Date: 1 December 1982
- Place: Pan Asian Repertory; New York, New York

Yellow Fever is a play by R. A. Shiomi, which takes place on Powell Street in Japantown, Vancouver, a gathering place for the local Japanese-Canadian culture. Set in the 1970s, the Sam Spade-like main character, Sam Shikaze, must work to unravel the mysteries that surround him. First produced by the Pan Asian Repertory Theatre in 1982, it received positive reviews and had a successful run off-Broadway.

== Plot summary ==
Sam Shikaze, a smooth private eye, narrates his own story about what happened when he was hired to find the missing Cherry Blossom Queen. He is soon trapped in a web of racism and political intrigue that seems to lead back to the Hong Kong tongs. Chuck Chan is a lawyer who tries to help solve the case, while Nancy Wing is a beautiful reporter who is searching for a story. Captain Kadota, an old friend of Sam's, offers his aid as a member of the police force, although Sam and Kadota do not see eye-to-eye on politics.

Characters and actors in the premier production

- Sam Shikaze (Donald Li)
- Rosie (Carol Honda)
- Goldberg (James Jenner)
- Chuck Chan (Henry Yuk)
- Nancy Wing (Freda Foh Shen)
- Sergeant Mackenzie (Jeffrey Spolan)
- Capt. Kenji Kadota (Ernest Abuba)
- Superintendent Jameson (James Jenner)

Presented by the Pan Asian Repertory Theater:

- Raul Aranasm, stage director
- Tisa Chang, artistic director
- Susan Socolowski, administrative director

== Awards and honors ==
- 1982: Bay Area Theater Circle Critics Award
- 1982: "Bernie" for new play from the San Francisco Chronicle
- 1983: Obie Award to Ernest Abuba for performance
