= Dematteis =

Dematteis or DeMatteis is a surname. Notable people with this surname include:

- Bernard Dematteis (born 1986), Italian mountain runner
- John Marc DeMatteis (born 1953), American writer
- Lou Dematteis, American photographer
- Martin Dematteis (born 1986), Italian mountain runner
