= Belinda Metz =

Canadian actor and musician (born 1960)

- Born: Belinda Marie Metz; January 4, 1960 (age 66); Edmonton, Alberta, Canada
- Occupations: Actress; Musician
- Years active: 1984–present
- Parent(s): Harry and Maria Metz

Belinda Marie Metz (born January 4, 1960) is a Canadian solo recording artist from the early to mid-1980s who has since gone into acting. She also has credits as a choreographer and songwriter.

== Early life ==
Metz was born in Edmonton, Alberta to Harry and Maria Metz, of whom the latter was Austrian, originally from Schwechat.

== Career ==
In 1982 Metz released an independent album, The Minx, on Quantum Records. Signed to a recording contract in 1985 with Attic Records, she released a full-length album, Electric Splash, which contained her only hit single, "What About Me", and won her a "Most Promising Female Vocalist" award from the U-Knows, CFNY's listener's choice awards.

In 1985 Metz was severely injured in a car accident. Later she returned to the public eye, acting as a regular in such shows as Kung Fu: The Legend Continues and TekWar. Recently, she had a role as Irene the band manager in the Disney Channel Original Series So Weird. She continues to act in television and movies, most recently Eight Below as well as doing voice over work for corporations like Telus. She continues to pursue an independent music career.

== Filmography ==
Belinda Metz Film and television credits
Year	Title	Role	Notes
1984	Charlie Grant's War	Christina	TV movie
1985	Tucker and the Horse Thief	Unknown	TV movie
1985	Night Heat	Carol Bates	Episode: "Songbird"
1986	Seeing Things	Leslie	Episode: "If Looks Could Kill"
1987	Seeing Things	Donna Anderson	Episode: "Bull's-Eye"
1987	Tomorrow's a Killer	Escort	Film
1987	Night Heat	Blonde Prostitute	Episode: "Grace"
1987	Adderly	Chambermaid	Episode: "Run to Darkness"
1989	Walter & Carlo i Amerika	Natasha Royka	Film
1989	War of the Worlds	Scoggs	Episode: "Night Moves"
1989	Friday the 13th: The Series	Sylvia; Jane Chalfont	Episode: "The Playhouse"; Episode: "The Prisoner"
1990	Friday the 13th: The Series	Jessica	Episode: "Spirit of Television"
1990	War of the Worlds	Scoggs	3 episodes
1991	E.N.G.	Mimi	Episode: "Smoke and Mirrors"
1991	Counterstrike	Angie	Episode: "Going Home"
1993	Secret Service	Dee Roberts	Episode: "Something for Nothing/The Amateur"
1993	Kung Fu: The Legend Continues	Det. Kira Blakemore	Episode: "Shadow Assassin"
1994–1997	Kung Fu: The Legend Continues	Det. Jody Powell	33 episodes
1994	TekWar	Sharmayne	Episode: "Sellout"
1995	Dark Eyes	Rita	Episode: "Pilot"
1995	The Donor	Janet	Film
1997	Goosebumps	Mrs. O'Dell	Episode: "Night of the Living Dummy III: Part 1"; Episode: "Night of the Living Dummy: Part 2"
1997	The Right Connections	Gail Tompkins	TV movie
1997	Convictions	Unknown	TV movie
1997	Medusa's Child	Unknown	TV movie
1998	Viper	Shauna Diamond	Episode: "What Makes Sammy Chun?"
1998–2000	Mentors	Anne Cates	9 episodes
1999	Dead Man's Gun	Gloria Dunn	Episode: "Sleepwalker"
1999–2001	So Weird	Irene Bell	TV series
2000–2001	Da Vinci's Inquest	Carla	3 episodes
2001	Mysterious Ways	Louise Stanislaw	Episode: "Doctor in the House"
2002	The Chris Isaak Show	Nicki Wooster	Episode: "Home of the Brave"
2004	Traffic	Shannon Isler	TV miniseries
2004	The Survivors Club	Linda Pesaturo	TV movie
2004	Cold Squad	Mrs. Spence	Episode: "Teen Angel"
2004	Going the Distance	Karma	Film
2005	The Collector	Brenda Conrad / Trixie	Episode: "The Cowboy"
2006	Class of the Titans	Euryale (voice)	Episode: "Sibling Rivalry"
2006	Eight Below	Dr. Rosemary Paris	Film
2006	The Suspect	Det. Rhodes	Film
2008	Boot Camp	Ben's Mother	Film
2010	Dear Mr. Gacy	Valerie Ross	Film
2013	Red Widow	Grace	Episode: "The Consignment"
