= Ernest Abuba =

Filipino-American actor (1947–2022)

- Born: August 25, 1947; Honolulu, Territory of Hawaii
- Died: June 21, 2022 (aged 74); New York City, U.S.
- Spouse: Tisa Chang (divorced)
- Children: 1
- Website: www.ernestabuba.com

Ernest Abuba (August 25, 1947 – June 21, 2022) was an American actor, playwright, and theatre director of Filipino descent. He appeared on stage and on film, with more than one hundred stage appearances, and was the co-founder of the Pan Asian Repertory Theatre.

== Early life ==
Born in Honolulu to Filipino parents, Abuba was raised in San Diego and Texas. He trained at the Actors Studio.

== Career ==
Abuba received an Obie Award in 1983 for his portrayal of Kenji Kadota in Yellow Fever. His Broadway credits include: Pacific Overtures, Loose Ends, Zoya's Apartment, and Lincoln Center Theatre's The Oldest Boy, which was his final Broadway role. Among the highlights of his long Off-Broadway career is that he was the first Asian American in the role of Sakini in Teahouse of the August Moon, and the first Asian American as MacBeth in Shogun Macbeth. On screen he was known for 12 Monkeys, Call Me, Forever Lulu and many more roles. As a playwright, he was known for 2013's Dojoji.

Abuba was on the theatre faculty at Sarah Lawrence College.

== Personal life ==
Abuba and Tisa Chang married in 1976 and had one son before divorcing. Abuba died in New York City on June 21, 2022.

== Filmography ==
=== Film ===
Ernest Abuba film credits
Year	Title	Role	Notes
1986	Forever, Lulu	Mugger #1	
1988	Call Me	Boss	
1990	King of New York	'King Tito' Salvador	
1992	Article 99	Ikiro Tenabe	
1995	12 Monkeys	Engineer	
1997	Hamlet, Prince of Denmark	The King	
1997	Tuff Luk Klub	Red's butler	Also associate producer

=== Television ===
Ernest Abuba television credits
Year	Title	Role	Notes
1976	Pacific Overtures	Samurai / Adams / Noble	Television film
1986	Adderly	Col. Doc Thieu	Episode: "Adderly with Eggroll"
1990	The Cosby Show	George Parker	Episode: "Getting the Story"
1990	Vestige of Honor	Thai Official	Television film
1991	Counterstrike	Chaing	Episode: "Night of the Black Moon"
1992	Ghostwriter	Karate Instructor	Episode: "To Catch a Creep: Part 3"
1993	Kung Fu: The Legend Continues	Tan	3 episodes "Initiation" Parts 1 & 2 (S1.E1-2) "Challenge" (S1.E8)
1995	New York News	Dr. Yamagucci	Episode: "A Question of Truth"
1996–97	New York Undercover	Sonny Fung	3 episodes
