= Ryder Britton =

Canadian actor

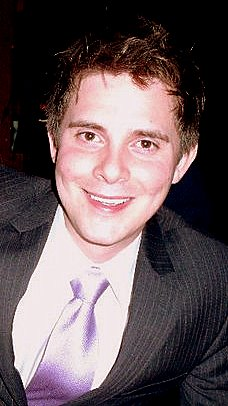
- Born: December 21, 1985 (age 40); Toronto, Canada
- Education: University of Guelph; Ivey Business School
- Occupation: Business manager

Ryder Britton (born December 21, 1985) is a former Canadian film and television actor.

A graduate from Ivey Business School (MBA), University of Guelph (BSc), and George Brown Theatre School, his most prominent role to date was as Young Richard Hayden in the hit film Tommy Boy. He has also had appearances on the television series Degrassi: The Next Generation, Runaway, and Goosebumps. In 2010, Ryder was also a contestant on the Canadian reality television show Mantracker.

Drawn to acting by his mother, who was also an actress, Britton enrolled in acting school shortly after her death from breast cancer in 2000.

== Filmography ==
Film
Year	Title	Role
1995	Tommy Boy	Young Richard

Television
Year	Title	Role	Notes
1995	Goosebumps	2nd Costumed Boy	2 episodes
2006	Runaway	Zach	Episode: "Father Figure"
2008	Degrassi: The Next Generation	Hugh	Episode: "Don't Stop Believing"
2010	Mantracker	Self	Episode: "Ryder and Brendyn"
