= The Other Barrio =

- Directed by: Dante Betteo
- Screenplay by: Dante Betteo; Richard Montoya
- Story by: Alejandro Murguia
- Produced by: Dante Betteo; Lou Dematteis; Frank Simeone
- Starring: Veronica Valencia; Richard Montoya; Geoff Hoyle
- Cinematography: Andrew Crighton
- Music by: Greg Landau
- Production company: SF Noir
- Release dates: February 8, 2015 (San Francisco Independent Film Festival)
- Running time: 96 minutes
- Country: United States

The Other Barrio is a 2015 neo-film noir directed by Dante Betteo, co-produced by Lou Dematteis, and based on the short story "The Other Barrio" by San Francisco Poet Laureate Alejandro Murguia. The production participated in the San Francisco "Scene in San Francisco Incentive Program" administered by the San Francisco Film Commission. The film premiered on February 8, 2015 at the Brava Theater in San Francisco. The East Coast premiere was at the Independent Film Festival in Washington DC on February 26, 2015.

The film stars Veronica Valencia, Richard Montoya, and Philip Kan Gotanda.

== Plot ==
San Francisco housing inspector Bob Morales (Montoya) as he investigates the suspicious circumstances of a fatal fire in a residential hotel in San Francisco's Latino Mission District and finds himself face to face with corruption at City Hall and the mysterious Sophia Nido (Valencia), a beautiful woman from his past.

This film, based on a story by San Francisco Poet Laureate Alejandro Murguia, addresses issues around gentrification and displacement of low-income communities. The film is based in part on the December 1975 fire at the Gartland Apartments at 16th and Valencia Streets in San Francisco.

== Cast ==
- Veronica Valencia ... Sophia Nido
- Richard Montoya ... Bob Morales
- Vincent Calvarese ... Huey
- Geoff Hoyle ... Open Road
- Nestor Cuellas ... Undercover Police
- Brian J. Patterson ... La Jessica
- Alexandra Tejeda Rieloff ... La Noche Guest (voice)
- Melinna Bobadilla ... Miss Mary
- James Hiser ... Johnson
- Pearl Wong ... Pearl
- Donald Lacy ... Brother Sydell
- Michael Torres ... Crow
- Sean San Jose ... Sean
- Christopher W. White ... Christopher
- Philip Kan Gotanda ... Bob's Boss
- David Louis Klein ... Callahan
