= Melvyn Escueta =

Filipino-American playwright (1945–1999)

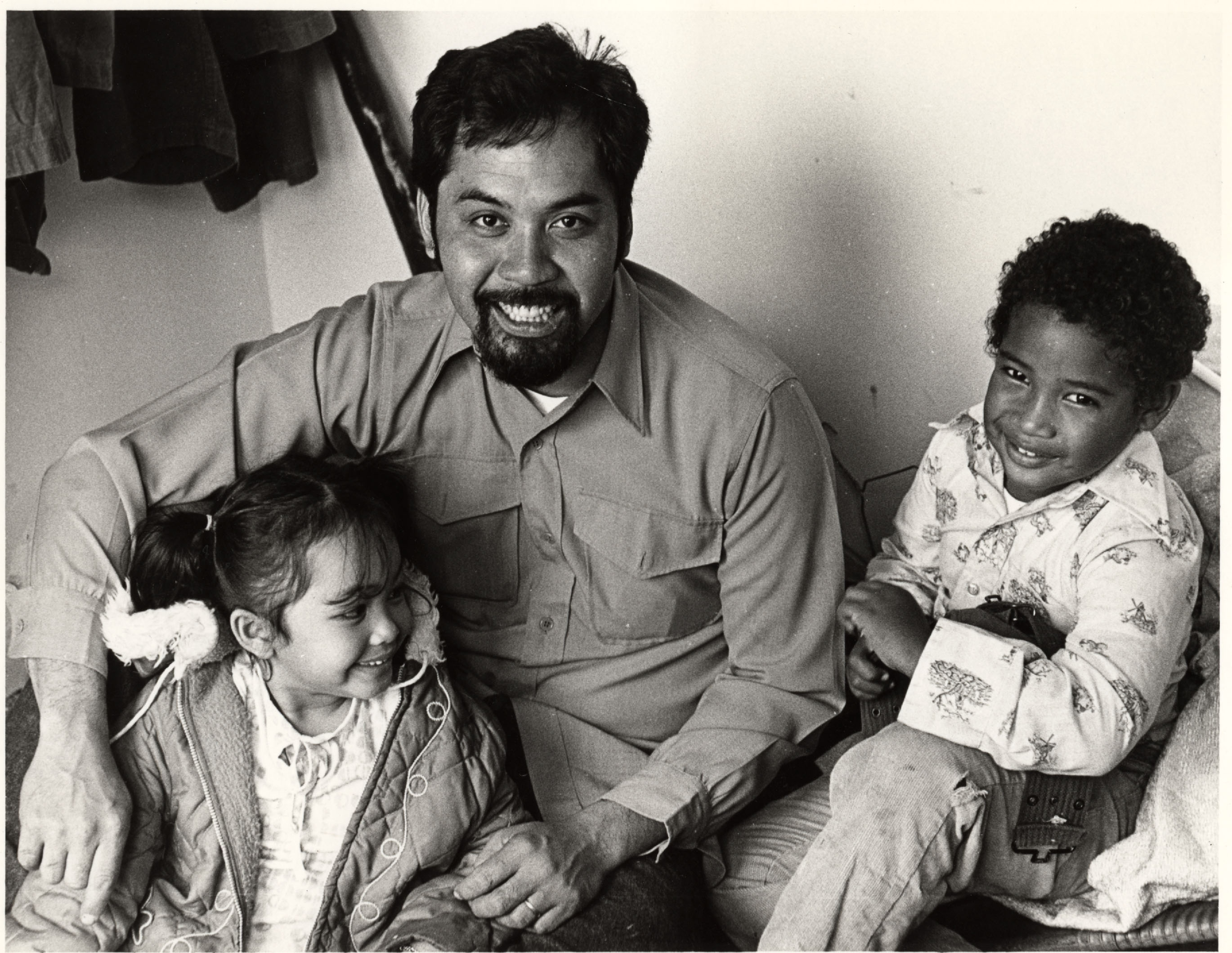
- Escueta in 1977
- Born: Melvyn Danguilan Escueta; January 26, 1945; Manila, Philippines
- Died: May 8, 1999 (aged 54); San Francisco, California, US
- Occupations: Social worker, teacher
- Spouse: Arlene E. Alfonso (m. 1976)
- Children: 3
- Writing career
- Period: 1976–1999
- Subject: Drama
- Notable works: Honey Bucket; Philippine Epic; A is For Atis

Melvyn Danguilan Escueta (January 26, 1945 - May 8, 1999) was a Filipino-American playwright who is best known as the author of the play Honey Bucket. He was among the founders of the Asian American Theater Company, a non-profit theatre performance company based in San Francisco.

== Biography ==
Melvyn Danguilan Escueta was born in Manila, Philippines on January 26, 1945, to mother Adoracion "Aida" Danguilan (1921–1997) and grew up in San Francisco. His father, Abelardo Escueta (1919–1944), was a guerrilla fighter in World War II.

From 1965 to 1971, Escueta served on active duty with the United States Marine Corps during the Vietnam War. He was stationed at the American embassy in Paris during the negotiations that ended the war. Following his discharge, Escueta returned to San Francisco, where he married Arlene Alfonso (b. 1953). In 1973, Escueta founded the Asian American Theater Company with fellow playwright Frank Chin.

Escueta's play Honey Bucket first premiered in 1976. The play surrounds a Vietnam War veteran named Andy Bonifacio who is guilt-ridden after killing Vietnamese soldiers, whom he considers to be his Asian brothers. The play was met with much acclaim, with one critic in The Sacramento Bee calling it "profoundly moving and disturbing" and "the best dramatic reminder I have seen... to come out of [Vietnam veterans'] experience". Escueta himself stated that "Honey Bucket" reflected his own experiences in Vietnam, stating, "I worked through Vietnam through this play and I know that other people can begin to work through it also".

Escueta's second play, Philippine Epic: Kamyumanggi, a showcase of Philippine history and culture, premiered at San Francisco State University in 1981. His third play, A is For Atis, portrayed the trials of a family of Filipino immigrants in the United States. Escueta also worked as a social worker, counseling incarcerated veterans, and taught both history and economics at San Francisco's Galileo Academy of Science and Technology.

Escueta died suddenly on May 8, 1999, while attending Galileo Academy's senior prom with his wife. He is buried at Golden Gate National Cemetery.
