= Tommy Boy =

1995 film by Peter Segal

- Theatrical release poster
- Directed by: Peter Segal
- Written by: Bonnie Turner; Terry Turner
- Produced by: Lorne Michaels
- Starring: Chris Farley; David Spade; Bo Derek; Brian Dennehy
- Cinematography: Victor J. Kemper
- Edited by: William Kerr
- Music by: David Newman
- Distributed by: Paramount Pictures
- Release date: March 31, 1995
- Running time: 97 minutes
- Country: United States
- Language: English
- Budget: $20 million
- Box office: $32.7 million

Tommy Boy is a 1995 American buddy comedy film directed by Peter Segal, written by Bonnie and Terry Turner, produced by Lorne Michaels, and starring Saturday Night Live alumni and close friends Chris Farley and David Spade. The first of many films that Segal has filmed with former SNL castmates, it tells the story of a socially and emotionally immature man (Farley) who learns lessons about friendship and self-worth, following the sudden death of his industrialist father.

Tommy Boy was released by Paramount Pictures on March 31, 1995. The film received mixed reviews from critics and grossed $32.7 million against a $20 million budget.

== Plot ==
After seven years at college, friendly but dim-witted Thomas R. "Tommy" Callahan III barely graduates from Marquette University and returns to his hometown of Sandusky, Ohio, to find most of the industrial sector shut down. His father, widowed industrialist Thomas R. "Big Tom" Callahan Jr., gives him an executive job at the family's auto parts plant, Callahan Auto, and reveals he will marry Beverly Barrish-Burns, whom he had met at a fat farm, with her son Paul effectively becoming Tommy's new stepbrother. He also encounters sales manager Michelle Brock, his old high school classmate. However, Big Tom suddenly suffers a fatal heart attack during the wedding reception. After the funeral, doubting the company will survive without Big Tom, the bank reneges on promises of a loan for a new brake pad division, requiring that the company's debts be resolved immediately. Tommy suggests that he will let the bank hold his few inherited shares and house in exchange for the bank giving time to sell 500,000 brake pads to prove the new division's viability; if he succeeds, the bank will underwrite the venture. Tommy then sets out on a cross-country sales trip with Big Tom's sardonic and sycophantic assistant Richard Hayden, a childhood acquaintance who is particularly antagonistic towards Tommy as he was simply given a high position at the company instead of earning it like Richard did.

Meanwhile, Beverly and Paul are shown kissing romantically; they reveal themselves as married con artists with criminal records. Instead of eventually suing for divorce and taking half of Big Tom's estate like they were planning, Beverly has inherited a controlling interest in the company. To convert that into cash, she seeks a quick sale to self-described "auto parts king" Ray Zalinsky, owner and operator of rival automotive parts company Zalinsky Auto Parts in Chicago.

On the road, Tommy's social anxiety and hyperactivity alienate several potential buyers. The lack of any progress leads to tension between Tommy and Richard, culminating in the near destruction of Richard's classic 1967 Plymouth GTX and a fistfight. However, after witnessing Tommy persuade a waitress to serve him chicken wings at a restaurant before the kitchen opens, Richard suggests he use his skill at reading people to make sales. The two reconcile and quickly reach their sales goal.

However, Paul sabotages the company's computers, causing sales posted by Michelle to be either lost or rerouted. With half of the sales now canceled, the bank (now backed by Beverly and Paul) decides to sell Callahan Auto to Zalinsky. Feeling she let Tommy down after not keeping any backups for the sales, Michelle abruptly quits. At the airport, Michelle notices Beverly and Paul kissing and calls her police detective brother to investigate. Hoping to persuade Zalinsky to reconsider, Tommy and Richard board a plane to Chicago posing as flight attendants. In Chicago, they briefly meet with Zalinsky, but he tells them he desires the reputation connected with the Callahan brand, planning to shutter the company and lay off its workers, which, in turn, would financially ruin the town.

Tommy and Richard are denied entrance to the Zalinsky board room since Tommy has no standing. As they wallow on the curb in self-pity, Michelle quickly arrives with Paul and Beverly's police records. Tommy devises a plan: dressed as a suicide bomber by using road flares (and Richard's wristwatch), he attracts the attention of a live television news crew and, along with Michelle and Richard, forces his way back into the board room. Back in Sandusky, Callahan workers watch the drama on television. In a final move of pure persuasion, Tommy quotes Zalinsky's own advertising slogan, claiming he stands for the "American working man." As the television audience watches, Zalinsky signs Tommy's purchase order for 500,000 brake pads. Although Zalinsky nullifies the purchase order as he will soon own Callahan Auto, Michelle arrives with Paul's police records, which include outstanding warrants for fraud.

Since Beverly is still married to Paul, her marriage to Big Tom was bigamous and therefore never legal, meaning that all of Big Tom's controlling shares thus belong to his son. When Tommy refuses to sell the shares, the deal with Zalinsky is off, and since Tommy still holds Zalinsky's purchase order, the company is saved. Paul attempts to flee, but accidentally triggers a crash test mechanism that subdues him, and he is subsequently arrested. Zalinsky admits defeat, honoring the sales order, and invites Beverly to dinner, who reluctantly agrees rather than join Paul in jail. Back in Sandusky, Tommy gives a speech at the plant saying he will take his presidency of Callahan Auto seriously to keep the workers steadily employed. Sailing in his dinghy on a lake, Tommy tells Big Tom's spirit he will continue his legacy at Callahan and says he must go ashore to have dinner with Michelle and her family, having begun a relationship with her.

== Cast ==
- Chris Farley as Thomas R. “Tommy” Callahan III, a never-do-well heir to a brake pad company in Ohio
  - Clinton Turnbull as Young Tommy
- David Spade as Richard Hayden, a former classmate to Tommy who climbed the corporate ladder at Callahan Auto
  - Ryder Britton as Young Richard
- Bo Derek as Beverly Burns-Barrish, Tommy's scheming stepmother who is a con artist along with her real husband
- Julie Warner as Michelle Brock, a high school classmate of Tommy's who later becomes his love interest
- Dan Aykroyd as Ray Zalinsky, an automotive mogul based out of Chicago seeking to buy Callahan Auto
- Brian Dennehy as Thomas R. "Big Tom" Callahan Jr., Tommy's widowed father who operated Callahan Auto
- Sean McCann as Frank Rittenhauer, the Vice President of Callahan Auto
- Zach Grenier as Ted Reilly
- James Blendick as Ron Gilmore, the town banker
- Rob Lowe as Paul Barrish, Tommy's older accident-prone stepbrother who is really Beverly's younger husband
- William Patterson Dunlop as R.T.
- David Hemblen as Archer
- Maria Vacratsis as Helen
- Colin Fox as Ted Nelson
- Jonathan Wilson as Marty
- Lorri Bagley as Woman in Pool

== Production ==
In March 1994, it was reported that Saturday Night Live cast member Chris Farley had accepted a pay-or-play deal from Paramount Pictures to star in Billy the Third from screenwriters Bonnie and Terry Turner with Lorne Michaels set to produce.

=== Filming ===
Tommy Boy was shot primarily in Toronto and Los Angeles under the working title Rocky Road.

== Soundtrack ==
Warner Bros. soundtrack release

1. "I Love It Loud (Injected Mix)" – written by Gene Simmons & Vincent Cusano, performed by Phunk Junkeez
2. "Graduation" – Chris Farley & David Spade
3. "Silver Naked Ladies" – Paul Westerberg
4. "Lalaluukee" – Chris Farley & David Spade
5. "Call On Me" – Primal Scream
6. "How Do I Look?" – Chris Farley & David Spade
7. "Wait for the Blackout" – written by The Damned (Scabies/Sensible/Gray/Vanian/Billy Karloff), performed by The Goo Goo Dolls
8. "Bong Resin" – David Spade
9. "My Hallucination" – Tommy Shaw & Jack Blades
10. "Air" – written by Pamela Laws & Nancy Hess, performed by Seven Day Diary
11. "Fat Guy In Little Coat" – Chris Farley & David Spade
12. "Superstar" – written by Leon Russell, Delaney Bramlett, & Bonnie Bramlett, performed by The Carpenters
13. "Jerk Motel" – Chris Farley & David Spade
14. "Is Chicago, Is Not Chicago" – Soul Coughing
15. "My Pretty Little Pet" – Chris Farley
16. "Come On Eileen" – Dexys Midnight Runners
17. "It's the End of the World as We Know It (And I Feel Fine)" – R.E.M.
18. "Eres Tú" – written by Juan Carlos Calderón, performed by Mocedades
19. "Housekeeping" – Chris Farley & David Spade
20. "My Lucky Day" – Smoking Popes

Other songs featured in the film

1. "What'd I Say" – written by Ray Charles, performed by Chris Farley and Brian Dennehy
2. "Maniac" – written by Michael Sembello and Dennis Matkosky
3. "Ain't Too Proud to Beg" – written by Eddie Holland & Norman Whitfield, performed by Louis Price
4. "Amazing Grace" – performed by The Pipes and Drums and Military of The King's Own Scottish Borderers
5. "Crazy" – written by Willie Nelson, performed by Patsy Cline
6. "I'm Sorry" – written by Ronnie Self & Dub Allbritten, performed by Brenda Lee
7. "Ooh Wow" – written by Sidney Cooper, performed by Buckwheat Zydeco
8. "The Future's So Bright, I Gotta Wear Shades" – written by Pat MacDonald, performed by Timbuk 3
9. "The Merry-Go-Round Broke Down" – Cliff Friend & Dave Franklin

== Release ==
=== Box office ===
Tommy Boy opened on March 31, 1995, and grossed $8 million in its opening weekend, finishing first at the box office. The film had a total box office gross of $32.7 million.

=== Home media ===
Tommy Boy premiered on VHS and LaserDisc on October 10, 1995. and was released as a two-disc "Holy Schnike" edition DVD in 2005.

== Reception ==
Tommy Boy received mixed reviews from critics upon its release. Rotten Tomatoes gives the film a 41% approval rating, based on 49 reviews, with an average rating of 5.2/10. The website's critical consensus reads, "Though it benefits from the comic charms of its two leads, Tommy Boy too often feels like a familiar sketch stretched thin." On Metacritic, the film has a score of 46 out of 100, based on reviews from 20 critics, indicating "Mixed or average reviews". Audiences surveyed by CinemaScore gave the film a grade A− on scale of A to F.

=== Critical reception ===
Kevin Thomas of the Los Angeles Times gave the film a positive review, calling it "sweet natured" and a "good belly laugh of a movie".

Brian Webster of the Online Film Critics Society also received the film positively, saying that the film would please Farley fans. Dan Marcucci and Nancy Serougi of the Broomfield Enterprise said the film was "Farley at his best", and Scott Weinberg of DVD Talk said that it was "pretty damn funny".

Among the negative reviews, Chicago Sun-Times film critic Roger Ebert only gave the film one star out of four, writing that: "Tommy Boy is one of those movies that plays like an explosion down at the screenplay factory. You can almost picture a bewildered office boy, his face smudged with soot, wandering through the ruins and rescuing pages at random. Too bad they didn't mail them to the insurance company instead of filming them." The film is on Ebert's "Most Hated" list.

Caryn James of The New York Times wrote that the film was "the very poor cousin of a dopey Jim Carrey movie".

Owen Gleiberman graded the film a "C" on an A+ to F scale, and Ken Hanke of Mountain Xpress said that it was a "Passably funny star vehicle. Nothing great."

=== Accolades ===
Bo Derek was nominated for a Razzie Award for Worst Supporting Actress.

== Dedication ==
Tommy Boy and the 1994 horror film Wes Craven's New Nightmare are dedicated to Gregg Fonseca (1952–1994), who died eight months before the release of Tommy Boy. While Fonseca did not work on either film, he served as production designer on the first two Nightmare on Elm Street films, as well as Coneheads and both Wayne's World films which, like Tommy Boy, were produced by Lorne Michaels.

== Legacy ==
Since its release, Tommy Boy has become a cult film on home video.

In the 2015 documentary film, I Am Chris Farley, many of his fellow SNL peers praised Farley's performance; Dan Aykroyd stated that the movie showcased Farley's quality and range as an actor, while Jay Mohr noted that audiences were able to see Farley's sensitive and vulnerable side.

== Cancelled sequel ==
In May 2025, David Spade revealed that Paramount had pitched a sequel project to him two years previous. Spade stated that the story would have involved the children of the respective lead characters from the original movie. Spade explained that he rejected the idea, noting to the studio that his opinion was that a follow-up movie without Chris Farley would never work.
