= Northwest Asian American Theatre =

Asian-American theatre in Washington state (1972–2004)

Coordinates: 47.5988°N 122.3239°W

The Northwest Asian American Theatre, originally Theatrical Ensemble of Asians and then Asian Exclusion Act, was an Asian-American theatre in Washington state from 1972 to 2004.

== University of Washington ==
In 1972, a group of students on the campus of the University of Washington started a theatre group called the Theatrical Ensemble of Asians. It was founded by a teacher named Stanley Asis in the school’s Ethnic Cultural Center, with its original members including students of Asian and Hispanic descent. Even in its humble beginnings, the theatre gave students an opportunity to explore their heritage and perform plays written by other Asian Americans; those who were not Asian American had an opportunity to be involved in a diverse group and celebrate other’s culture. In a later reflection by Judith Nihei, who would become the creative director for the group, “Asians weren’t being cast in mainstream productions. So we figured we’d better do our own productions.”

== Multi-media centre ==
After graduating, the group remained militant and moved into a theatre in a multi-media center within the Seattle Chinatown-International District, adopting the name of the Asian Exclusion Act (AEA). To some, this name seemed indelicate. But to those involved and who celebrated its name, it was a way to throw the injustice that had been served back into the face of those who had oppressed them previously. As a popular playwright for the theatre Frank Chin stated, “the name reflects this Asian American theatre’s responsibility to Asian American art and culture, that has been totally excluded from the pop and high culture of West Coast America.” The first play the group produced under their new name was Momoko Iko's Gold Watch which focused on the discrimination building up towards the Japanese American Concentration Camps following Pearl Harbor. The majority of the plays the AEA performed focused on addressing their community's painful history and the racism they still face in society, often in a mocking or humorous way.

The theatre quickly grew to be very successful, with many of its player rising to fame after: something they may not have been able to achieve without the AEA's contributions to introducing Asian American theatre.

== Theatre Off Jackson ==
The theatre faced a multitude of difficulties, such as the funding of their original performance center, a multi-media center, being cut by the city in 1977. The actors again would not give up. The group performed out of the Nippon Kan Theatre. Around this time, the group started looking for grants from foundations, and decided to change their name to the Northwest Asian American Theatre (NWAAT). They found a home by converting an automobile repair shop into the Theatre Off Jackson. As then creative director Beatrice Kiyohara stated, "getting our own theatre has been a long, long struggle; the company can now only get bigger and stronger, because finally audiences will be able to find us."

== Closure ==
The NWAAT is still considered a flagship Asian American theatre company in the Pacific Northwest, and can boast being the first of its kind in the region. Kiyohara resigned in 1993, with Judi Nihei taking over as artistic director for about five years. Over this period of time, many actors and writers left the theatre and Seattle to pursue opening opportunities in cities such as Los Angeles and New York City. In 2004, the theatre performed its last play, and closed its doors.

== Digitization ==
In 2019, the Wing Luke Museum received a grant to digitize old production recordings from throughout NWAAT's history. Uploading the tapes to the open source Internet Archive, content includes audition reels, work samples required for funding requests, and full productions originally kept for archival purposes. Full productions include plays by Wakako Yamauchi, Philip Kan Gotanda, David Henry Hwang, Jeannie Barroga, Amy Hill, and other playwrights.
