= Asian American Theater Company =

US non-profit theatre performance company

The Asian American Theater Company (AATC) is a non-profit theatre company based in San Francisco. The company's "main stage" productions are new plays and revivals of classics by Asia/Pacific Island American playwrights, directed, performed, and designed by locals. Most scripts are developed at AATC and are presented at venues around the Bay Area.

== Mission ==
Its mission is "To connect people to Asian American culture through Theatre". In addition to producing shows, AATC is a workshop where Asia/Pacific Islands writers, actors and directors can explore ideas and create works that reflect the AATC's mission.

== History ==
The Asian American Theater Company was established in 1973 by playwrights Frank Chin and Melvyn Escueta, among others, to develop and present original works of theatre about Americans of Asian and Pacific Islander descent. AATC is credited as a progenitor of the Asian-American theater movement alongside East West Players and Pan Asian Repertory Theatre.

For many years, AATCwas housed in the Asian American Theater Center. The Theater Center was damaged from the 1989 Loma Prieta earthquake, but was able to re-open its doors a year later. However, the costly repairs created a heavy economic burden and in 1996 it moved its administrative offices to Japantown, and produced its plays in venues such as the Off-Market Theater and the Thick House.

== Programs ==
Under its Emerging Artists Project, young actors, many of whom are making their acting debut, perform plays by new playwrights or revivals.

A training program consisting of two semesters in acting, scene study, voice and movement and playwright's workshops, conducted by professional artists is also offered.

The group hosts staged readings, where scripts under development are directed, rehearsed and presented, followed by discussion and critique.

== Alumni ==
Notable alumni include:

=== Actors ===
- Michael Paul Chan
- Dennis Dun
- Amy Hill
- Marc Hayashi
- Rodney Kageyama
- Lane Nishikawa
- Greg Watanabe
- Victor Wong
- Kelvin Han Yee

=== Playwrights ===
- Frank Chin
- Melvyn Danguilan Escueta
- Philip Kan Gotanda
- Hiroshi Kashiwagi
- Ken Narasaki
- Rick Shiomi

== See also ==
- Asian American theatre
