= William Patterson Dunlop =

Canadian actor (1951–2009)

William Patterson Dunlop, Jr., known professionally as William Dunlop, (1951–2009) was a Canadian actor of stage, television, and film. He is best remembered for portraying Chief of Detectives Frank Strenlich in the PTEN television series Kung Fu: The Legend Continues from 1993 through 1997. On stage he had a productive relationship with the Stratford Shakespeare Festival .

== Life and career ==
Born in Montréal, Québec, Dunlop was the son of William Patterson Dunlop, Sr. (1912-1989) and Frances Ina MacGregor Will (1918-1989). His father was born in Montréal of Irish parents, and his mother was born in Aberdeen, Scotland. He graduated from Sedbergh School in Montebello, QC. While a student there he studied theatre with Patrick Pettigrew who had a profound impact on his intellectual development.

The majority of Dunlop's career was spent on the stage, particularly at the Stratford Shakespeare Festival in Stratford, Ontario. His performance credits at the Stratford Festival included leading roles in King Lear (1985), Rosencrantz and Guildenstern Are Dead (1986, alternating performances in both title roles), Twelfth Night (1985 and 1991), Our Town (1991) and The Taming of the Shrew (1977).

Dunlop made his film debut in the 1979 horror film The House with Steps. He did not work in film again until 1995 when he portrayed R.T. in Tommy Boy. He starred as Frank in Jack Blum's 1998 film Babyface. On television, Dunlop is best known for his portrayal of Chief of Detectives Frank Strenlich in the main cast of Kung Fu: The Legend Continues (1993–97). His other television performance included guest roles on Alfred Hitchcock Presents (1989), Top Cops (1992–93), Secret Service (1993), Street Legal (1993, recurring role of Sgt. Lehrer), and Due South (1994-1995).
