= Ambush Bay =

1966 film by Ron Winston

- 1966 film poster
- Directed by: Ron Winston
- Written by: Marve Feinberg; Ib Melchior
- Produced by: Hal Klein
- Starring: Hugh O'Brian; Mickey Rooney; James Mitchum
- Cinematography: Emmanuel I. Rojas
- Edited by: John F. Schreyer
- Music by: Richard LaSalle
- Production company: Courageous Films
- Distributed by: United Artists
- Release date: September 14, 1966
- Running time: 109 minutes
- Country: United States
- Language: English

Ambush Bay is a 1966 American war film directed by Ron Winston and starring Hugh O'Brian, Mickey Rooney and James Mitchum. It was filmed on location in the Philippines.

== Plot ==
Prior to the 1944 American invasion of the Philippines a hand-picked team of U.S. Marine Corps amphibious reconnaissance scouts is landed by a PBY Catalina with the mission of contacting an intelligence agent who has crucial information. Each Marine is not only experienced but has a special skill with the exception of the radio operator, PFC Grenier (James Mitchum).

Grenier, an air crew radioman with only six months in the Corps is taken off the PBY's air crew when the original radio operator suddenly became medically unfit for the mission. He is given the sick Marine's radio and camouflage jacket to carry on his first ground combat mission. He serves as a narrator to the audience.

After meeting up with their guide (Manual Amado), the patrol commander Captain Alonzo Davis (Lieutenant Colonel Clement J. Stadler who had been awarded the Navy Cross and who also acted as the film's technical advisor) is killed while ambushing a small group of Japanese soldiers, and First Sergeant Corey (Hugh O'Brian, recognized as one of the youngest Drill Instructors to have served in the USMC) takes command.

Pvt. George George and Pfc. Henry Reynolds are killed while taking out a Japanese tank and patrol. Cpl. Stanley Parrish (Greg Amsterdam, the son of Morey Amsterdam) is killed by a guerrilla trap soon after. As they walk on, Amado is shot by a Japanese officer while scaling a small hill. The marines let him die to keep their presence secret. Grenier is eventually told by Gunnery Sergeant Wartell (Mickey Rooney) that they were sent to recover some important information from a contact in a tea house whose radio was destroyed, thus explaining the radio's importance to the mission.

Grenier's inexperience and incompetence arouses anger amongst Corey and the other members of the patrol. His only friend is easy going but professional Gunnery Sergeant Wartell who acts as a mediator between the hard no nonsense 1st Sgt Corey and Grenier, explaining each one to the other and the audience. Rooney provides the only comedy relief in the film when his character is captured and interrogated by a group of careless Japanese soldiers.

The surviving squad members eventually arrive at the tea house but, unfortunately, Amado was the one who was supposed to meet the contact as he was the only Filipino in the group. Desperate, Corey decides to meet the contact, Miyazaki a Japanese-American woman from Long Beach, California. While sneaking out of the camp with Miyazaki, Corey crashes into a waiter and the two run across a straw bridge then blow it up with a grenade, escaping from the soldiers. Meanwhile, a large skirmish with a Japanese patrol has killed Cpl. Alvin Ross and Platoon Sergeant William Maccone, shot the radio up beyond repair, and wounded Gunnery Sergeant Wartell. Wartell, knowing he will slow the survivors down, tells the reluctant Corey to leave him behind. When they leave, he plants grenades under himself and is captured by the Japanese soldiers. After toying with them a bit during his interrogation he sets off the grenades, taking them all out in the blast, and leaving Corey and Grenier the only surviving marines. The explosion is heard by the survivors and they sadly track on.

Corey and Grenier learn from Miyazaki that the Japanese are expecting the invasion fleet and have placed a mine field powerful enough to destroy the entire fleet in the water around the invasion sites. Arriving at a friendly Filipino village, Corey and Grenier are able to escape a Japanese patrol by boat. But Miyazaki is killed by an officer she seduced to buy the guys some time. At last discovering the principles of mission accomplishment, altruism, and self-sacrifice through observation, Grenier becomes a squared away Marine. He and his First Sergeant infiltrate the enemy base to remotely detonate the minefield with the Japanese radio transmitter. As Corey provides a one-man army diversion, Grenier is able to detonate the mines by radio control. Grenier then steals a radio and goes to tell Corey of their success, only to find Corey dead of blood loss from wounds he got while holding off the Japanese, leaving Grenier the sole survivor of the mission. Grenier escapes to the coast and radios for pick up. The movie ends with Grenier looking at the ocean while he listens to a speech by General MacArthur as he awaits pick up.

== Cast ==
- Hugh O'Brian as Sgt. Steve Corey
- Mickey Rooney as Sgt. Ernest Wartell
- James Mitchum as Pvt. James Grenier
- Peter Masterson as Sgt. William Maccone (as Pete Masterson)
- Harry Lauter as Cpl. Alvin Ross
- Greg Amsterdam as Cpl. Stanley Parrish
- Bruno Punzalan as Ramon
- Tisa Chang as Miyazaki
- Buff Fernandez as L.t. Tokuzo
- Joaquin Fajardo as Capt. Koyamatsu
- Limbo Lagdameo as Man
- Nonong Arceo as Soldier
- Jim Anauo as Pvt. Henry Reynolds
- Tony Smith as Pvt. George George
- Clem Stadler as Capt. Alonzo
- Amado Abello as Amado
- Juris Sulit as Midori
- Max Quismundo as Max

== Production ==
Television director Ron Winston made his feature debut with the film. It was also the motion picture debuts of then 19‑year‑old Tisa Chang and Peter Masterson. Marine Lieutenant Colonel Clement J. Stadler also acted as a technical advisor for All the Young Men, Hell to Eternity, The Outsider, and The Lieutenant television series.

A novelisation of the film's screenplay was written by Jack Pearl.

During filming, Mickey Rooney became ill with a fever. While he was hospitalized in Manila, his estranged wife Barbara Ann Thomason was killed by Milos Milos, her lover, in a murder-suicide.

== Reception ==
The New York Times remarked that the film was one that everyone had seen at least once in some form but was "a trim, muscular, pint-sized package as sensible as it is modest that makes a little count for a lot".

== See also ==
- List of American films of 1966
