= Katie Ka Vang =

American poet

- Education: Brown University
- Occupations: Performance artist, poet, playwright
- Website: katiekavang.com

Katie Ka Vang is a Hmong American performance artist, poet, and playwright. She has created and written several performance pieces and plays, most of which are influenced by her upbringing in Hmong culture. Her productions center around themes of the complexity of culture, community, dis-ease, and diaspora.

== Early life ==
Vang was born in Santa Ana, California, lived in Colorado, and moved to Minneapolis–Saint Paul in 1999. Growing up, Vang attended Hmong church, where she sang in the praise choir and developed a love for music that influences her plays. For college, she attended Concordia University, where she studied marketing, then attended Brown University and graduated with an MFA in Playwriting.

== Career ==
In 2011, Theater Mu premiered Vang's first play, WTF. Since then, Vang's works have appeared at numerous venues, including Mixed Blood Theater, the Center for Hmong Arts and Talent, Walker Art Center, Exposed Brick Theatre, Pillsbury House Theatre, Ordway Center for the Performing Arts, and Pangea World Theater.

Vang has received grants from the Jerome Foundation and the Minnesota State Arts Board. She received an NPN Creation Fund grant to complete Hmong Bollywood. In 2012, she was awarded the Woman of the Year award; this recognized her contributions to the lives of Hmong women and the Hmong community. Vang has also worked as a program director, volunteer, and teaching artist with the Center for Hmong Arts and Talent, one of the world's first Hmong arts organizations.

In 2009, she self-published a book of poetry and prose called Never Said. Vang has also published work in the St. Paul Almanac, Bakka Mag, Asian American Press, and Voices from the Asian American Experience.

As of 2023, Vang was named one of ten Artist Disruptor Fellows at The Center for Cultural Power, where she will work with the Indigenous Roots Cultural Arts Center in Saint Paul, Minnesota.

== Works ==
=== Plays ===
- Hmong Bollywood (2013)
- WTF (2011)
- 5:1 Meaning of Freedom; 6:2 Use of Sharpening
- Fast FWD Motions
- In Quarantine
- FINAL ROUND
- Spirit Trust
- Again (2023)

== Personal life ==
In 2012, Vang was diagnosed with stage four non-Hodgkin’s lymphoma. She has been in remission since 2016.
