= Lou Dematteis =

American photographer and filmmaker

- Born: Palo Alto, California
- Education: University of San Francisco De Young Museum Art School,
- Occupations: photographer, filmmaker

Lou Dematteis is an American photographer and filmmaker whose work focuses on documenting social, environmental and political conflict and their consequences in the United States and around the world.

== Biography ==
Born in Palo Alto, California, Dematteis grew up on the San Francisco Peninsula. He graduated in political science from the University of San Francisco and studied photography at the De Young Museum Art School, San Francisco.

Dematteis has spent much of the last thirty years working in Mexico, the Caribbean, Central and South America, Europe, and Asia. A former staff photographer with Reuters, Dematteis was based in Managua, Nicaragua, during the height of the Contra war. His photographic anthology, Nicaragua: A Decade of Revolution, was published by Norton in 1991. In 1993, he traveled to the Ecuadorian Amazon to document the damaging effects of Texaco's oil exploitation and resultant environmental pollution. He has returned several times to continue this documentation and has most recently focused on the health impacts on the people of the Amazon as a result of Texaco's toxic contamination. His work from Ecuador can be seen in the exhibit Crude Reflections: ChevronTexaco's Rainforest Legacy and online at Chevron Toxico.

Dematteis's photos have been widely exhibited in the United States and abroad, including showings at the Ansel Adams Center in San Francisco and the Photographers' Gallery in London. In 1992, he directed and participated in the first exhibit by U.S. photographers in Vietnam since the end of the war; and in fall 1994, he presented the first exhibit by Vietnamese photographers to show in the United States as well.

His work has been exhibited on four continents and in 2007 he received a grant from the Open Society Institute to exhibit his work from the Ecuadoran Amazon in the communities in Ecuador most affected by the contamination left in the region as a result of Texaco's oil extraction practices. His bilingual book on the subject, Crude Reflections/Cruda Realidad was published in 2008 by City Lights Books. Dematteis lives and works in San Francisco.

Dematteis works in film as well as still photography. His award-winning documentary Crimebuster: A Son's Search for His Father, which he produced and directed, was shown on Public Television nationwide beginning in June 2012. His latest film project, the film noir narrative feature The Other Barrio premiered as the Centerpiece Film at the San Francisco Indie Fest at the Brava Theater in San Francisco on February 8, 2015. Produced by Dematteis and Dante Betteo, The Other Barrio is a noir feature film directed by Betteo based on a story by San Francisco Poet Laureate Alejandro Murguia. It is set in San Francisco's Latino Mission District and addresses the timely issues of fires, gentrification and the displacement of low-income communities.

== Major works ==
- Nicaragua: A Decade of Revolution (Norton, 1991)
- A Portrait of Viet Nam (Norton, 1996)
- Crude Reflections (City Lights, 2008) ISBN 978-0-87286-472-6
- Crimebuster: A Son's Search for His Father—Feature documentary film (2012).
- The Other Barrio—Narrative feature film, premiere February 2015

== Exhibitions ==
- War on Nicaragua, Eye Gallery, San Francisco 1987; Alternative Museum, New York, 1988; Ansel Adams Center, San Francisco, 1990; The Photographers' Gallery, London
- A Portrait of Viet Nam, Gallery Saigon, Ho Chi Minh City, 1999; Foreign Correspondents Club of Thailand, Bangkok, 1999; Hemphill Gallery, Washington, D.C., 2002
- Crude Reflections: ChevronTexaco's Rainforest Legacy, Mudd's Environmental Center, San Ramon, California, 2005; San Francisco Arts Commission Gallery, 2005; Bolívar House, Center for Latin America Studies, Stanford University, Palo Alto, California, 2006; St. Mary's College, Moraga, California, 2006
