= Tisa Chang =

Chinese-American actress and theatre director (born 1941)

- Born: April 5, 1941 (age 84); Chongqing, Republic of China
- Occupation: Theatre director
- Known for: Acting in theatre and film, establishing Pan Asian Repertory Theatre in 1977
- Spouse: Ernest Abuba

Tisa Chang (born April 5, 1941) is a Chinese-American actress and theatre director born in Chongqing. Her father, Ping-Hsun Chang, was a diplomat, and her family moved from China to New York City when she was a child. Chang was interested in theatre and began studying acting in high school, at the High School of Performing Arts, then at Barnard College. Soon after finishing college, she started her career as an actor performing in Broadway plays and musicals, including Lovely Ladies, Kind Gentlemen and The Basic Training of Pavlo Hummel. She also appeared in a few films, including Ambush Bay and Greetings.

Chang began directing theatre in 1973, when she began working at La MaMa Experimental Theatre Club. With money earned from her Broadway acting, she established the Pan Asian Repertory Theatre in 1977. Her intention in creating the group was to popularize Asian-American theater and to create opportunities for Asian Americans to find nonstereotypical roles. Chang has received several awards for her work, including a Theatre World Special Award in 1988. She remains active as artistic director of the Pan Asian Repertory Theatre to present.

== Early life ==
Tisa Chang was born on April 5, 1941, in Chongqing, Republic of China. At the age of six, she and her family moved to New York City. Her father, a Taiwanese diplomat, was appointed as the Republic of China's consul general to the city in 1946. He moved back to Taiwan in 1957 to serve within the Ministry of Foreign Affairs. According to TV Times, "for 11 years, [Tisa] Chang was steeped in the subtleties and protocol of diplomacy. Her deep diplomatic connections extended as far as Ottawa, where the ambassador from the Republic of China, Liu Chieh, was a friend of her father's and she called the Canadian-based diplomat "uncle". Chang chose to stay in New York with her three siblings instead of going with her father to Taiwan.

Chang became interested in theatre at a young age, and was taken by her mother to see operas and plays. She even performed her own rendition of Cinderella for her nanny in the family's kitchen when she was 10 years old. Her father was also interested in acting and performed in school plays when he was younger at Nankai University together with Zhou Enlai, who went on to become the leader of China.

== Career ==
After finishing college, Chang performed in several musicals as a dancer. She then started acting in Broadway plays and musicals, including Lovely Ladies, Kind Gentlemen (1970–1971), The Basic Training of Pavlo Hummel (1977), and Pacific Overtures (1976). She also acted in television and film. She had roles in Ambush Bay (1966) with Hugh O'Brien, Mickey Rooney, and James Mitchum, Greetings (1968) with Robert De Niro, Escape from Iran: The Canadian Caper (1981 television film by Lamont Johnson), Enormous Changes at the Last Minute (1983 television film), A Doctor's Story (1984 television film), and Michael Cimino's Year of the Dragon (1985) with Mickey Rourke. In Escape from Iran, she used her diplomatic background to play the wife of Kenneth D. Taylor, the Canadian ambassador to Iran during the Iran hostage crisis.

After acting for a few years, Chang started directing theatre. She made the change because "it was a chance to work on projects that resonate deeply and personally and highlighted my world [...] of coming from a divided China that was still in the throes of revolution, but steeped in culture and history. As a director, I had more autonomy in choosing projects, and felt I was contributing to American theatre with stories drawn from China's vast literary legacy. I had been acting and dancing professionally for 10 years on- and off-Broadway, so I had a very good immersion into mainstream theatre. With directing, I can help shape what the audience experiences and walks away with."

Chang began her directing career in 1973 at the La MaMa Experimental Theatre Club, where she began as a director for Ellen Stewart's Chinese Theatre Group. She directed and/or produced bilingual versions of classical Asian and western plays, such as A Midsummer Night's Dream in both Mandarin and English and Servant of Two Masters, in which all the asides were spoken in the characters' native language. Chang was working as an actress and dancer at La MaMa when she asked Stewart for the opportunity to direct her own play. Her first work was the Peking opera The Return of the Phoenix, which opened in 1973 during the Independence Day weekend. Chang described this date as "the death slot" when it comes to theatre visitors, but "fortunately, Richard Shepard of The New York Times came down to East 4th Street and loved the show, praised it."

Chang established the Pan Asian Repertory Theatre as a resident company at La MaMa in 1977, with the intention of popularizing Asian-American theater. Chang has said that "the extraordinary talent and dedication of the actors [at Stewart's Chinese Theatre Group] inspired me to formalize the group into Pan Asian Repertory Theatre." She used the money she earned from starring in The Basic Training of Pavlo Hummel to fund the beginnings of Pan Asian. Chang's main principle with Pan Asian has always been to "promote opportunities for Asian-American actors to be seen in context of who we really are and what we are capable of achieving as artists." According to Chang, Asian-Americans had difficulty finding roles in New York City before she established Pan Asian. They were usually limited to playing stereotypical Asian characters, such as geisha girls and houseboys. It was easier for Asian-American actors to find substantive roles in Los Angeles, where the East West Players had been founded in 1965. Many people in the theatre business doubted that Pan Asian would be successful. Chang has said that "because we were considered a curiosity or something very new and unique, people did come." TV Times wrote in 1981 that Pan Asian was "the most respected experimental theatre group in New York City." As of 2009, it is the world's largest producer of Asian-American theatre.

Since Chang started Pan Asian Repertory Theatre, much progress has been made for Asian-American actors in American theatre. However, as The New York Times writes in 2007, "the struggle continues, and not only in the live theater." Daniel Dae Kim, a Korean American actor who first worked with Pan Asian in 1990, told the newspaper, "whereas it’s gotten better for ethnic minorities in terms of general representation, what hasn’t really improved is the complexity of the roles that we’ve been given to play. Many of the parts I see Asians playing onstage, as well as on screen, are smaller supporting roles whose function is to provide exposition or support to the leads." Kim is famous for acting in the television shows Lost and the new Hawaii Five-O.

In addition to her work as artistic director at Pan Asian Repertory Theatre, Chang has also directed some of her own plays and musicals for the group. She directed the world premiere of Shanghai Lil's at the Pan Asian Repertory Theatre in 1997, and returned to direct a new production in November 2011 at the West End Theatre in New York. In 1988, she was awarded a Theatre World Special Award for the establishment of Pan Asian and her directorial work. Chang has also won the 2002 Lifetime Achievement Award from the Organization of Chinese Americans, the 2001 Lee Reynolds Award from the League of Professional Theatre Women, the 1993 Chinese American Cultural Pioneer Tribute from New York City Council Andrew Stein, and the 1991 Barnard Medal of Distinction. She is currently on the executive board of the Stage Directors and Choreographers Society.

In 2016, Chang was an honoree at East West Players annual awards dinner and silent auction. She received the Visionary Award, which seeks to celebrate "individuals who have raised the visibility of the Asian Pacific American (APA) community through their craft." In an interview, Chang shared her vision for East West Players and Pan Asian to collaborate and grow.

== Personal life ==
Chang married Ernest Abuba on January 25, 1976, at the La MaMa Annex. He worked as an actor, playwright, and director at Pan Asian. They divorced in the early 1990s, but remained friends. They had one son together, named Auric Kang.
