= Mentors (TV series) =

Canadian TV series

- Genre: Fantasy; Science fiction Teen drama
- Created by: Josh Miller
- Starring: Chad Krowchuk; Sarah Lind; Shaun Johnston; Belinda Metz; Stevie Mitchell; Samantha Krutzfeldt
- Country of origin: Canada
- Original language: English
- No. of seasons: 4
- No. of episodes: 52

Production
- Executive producers: Kevin DeWalt; Margaret Mardirossian
- Producer: Josh Miller
- Production locations: Edmonton, Alberta
- Running time: 22 minutes
- Production companies: Minds Eye Entertainment; Anaid Productions

Original release
- Network: Family Channel
- Release: June 12, 1998 – April 2, 2002

Mentors is a Canadian science fiction fantasy series that aired on Family Channel. It was aired on Discovery Kids in the United States and Latin America. It also aired in Japan on NHK where it was dubbed in Japanese. In 2017, the first season started streaming worldwide for free on Canada Media Fund's Encore+ YouTube channel until it was shut down in 2022.

== Plot ==
Mentors follows the adventures of 15-year-old boy genius Oliver Cates who uses his computer to bring famous historical figures such as Albert Einstein, Alexander Graham Bell, and Joan of Arc from the past into the present for 36 hours. He and his friend Dee Sampson often use the device to help cope with the challenges of being teenagers, as well as learning about history. Eventually Oliver hands the machine over to his two cousins Simon and Crystal, who bring forward figures such as Confucius, Anaïs Nin and Vlad the Impaler.

== Cast ==
- Chad Krowchuk as Oliver Cates
- Sarah Lind as Dee Sampson
- Belinda Metz as Anne Cates
- Shaun Johnston as Roy Cates
- Stevie Mitchell as Simon Cates
- Samantha Krutzfeldt as Crystal Cates

== Episodes ==
=== Series overview ===
Season	Episodes	Originally released	
Season	Episodes	First released	Last released
1	13	June 12, 1998	March 26, 1999
2	13	August 18, 2000	November 10, 2000
3	13	May 8, 2001	May 28, 2001
4	13	March 15, 2002	April 2, 2002

=== Season 1 (1998–99) ===
No. overall	No. in series	Title	Directed by	Written by	Original release date
1	1	"The Genius"	Arvi Liimatainen	Josh Miller	June 12, 1998
2	2	"Smart Aleck"	Francis Damberger	Josh Miller	June 19, 1998
3	3	"Raising the Siege"	Arvi Liimatainen	Conni Massing	June 26, 1998
4	4	"Lewis in Wonderland"	Francis Damberger	Bruce Edwards	July 3, 1998
5	5	"Little Emperor"	Arvi Liimatainen	Victor Nicolle	July 10, 1998
6	6	"Wilde Card"	Rick Stevenson	Donald Martin	July 17, 1998
7	7	"A Ninth of Beethoven"	Fred Frame	David Wiechorek	January 16, 1999
8	8	"A Transient, Shining Trouble"	Michele Boniface	Josh Miller	January 23, 1999
9	9	"The Presence of Saint Nick"	Arvi Liimatainen	Peter Lapres	February 6, 1999
10	10	"The Raven"	Gil Cardinal	Gregory Kennedy	March 5, 1999
11	11	"Harriet's Path"	Gil Cardinal	Gregory Kennedy	March 12, 1999
12	12	"The Crush"	Michele Boniface	Conni Massing	March 19, 1999
13	13	"The Rescue"	Rick Stevenson	Wendy Brotherlin	March 26, 1999

=== Season 2 (2000) ===
No. in series	Title	Original release date
1	"The Truth Is in Here"	August 18, 2000
2	"Her Grace Under Pressure"	August 25, 2000
3	"Dear Diary"	September 1, 2000
4	"The Glory Trail"	September 8, 2000
5	"Right Place, Right Time"	September 15, 2000
6	"Nothing But Net"	September 22, 2000
7	"Father's Day"	September 29, 2000
8	"The Book of Love"	October 6, 2000
9	"Stranger in a Strange Land"	October 13, 2000
10	"The Fire Ship"	October 20, 2000
11	"Klondike Daze"	October 27, 2000
12	"Seer and Now"	November 3, 2000
13	"Future Tense"	November 10, 2000

=== Season 3 (2001) ===
No. in series	Title	Original release date
1	"The Good, the Bad and the Ollie"	May 8, 2001
2	"The Odd Pod"	May 12, 2001
3	"Man's Best Friend"	May 13, 2001
4	"Citizen Cates"	May 14, 2001
5	"Experience"	May 15, 2001
6	"Silent Movie"	May 19, 2001
7	"Such Stuff as Dreams Are Made Of"	May 20, 2001
8	"Work in Progress"	May 21, 2001
9	"Nothing to Fear"	May 22, 2001
10	"Anything You Can Do"	May 26, 2001
11	"Remembrance Day"	May 27, 2001
12	"The Tao of Hockey"	May 28, 2001
13	"Homesick"	May 29, 2001

=== Season 4 (2002) ===
No. in series	Title	Original release date
1	"Enter the Monolith"	March 15, 2002
2	"The Private Eyes"	March 16, 2002
3	"Humbug"	March 17, 2002
4	"The Other Half"	March 18, 2002
5	"Transition"	March 22, 2002
6	"Breakthrough"	March 23, 2002
7	"Future Forward"	March 24, 2002
8	"Dusty Trails"	March 25, 2002
9	"Cursed"	March 29, 2002
10	"Once and Future King"	March 30, 2002
11	"Secrets and Lies"	March 31, 2002
12	"A Matter of Time: Part 1"	April 1, 2002
13	"A Matter of Time: Part 2"	April 2, 2002
