= Katie Hae Leo =

American dramatist

Katie Hae Leo is a Korean American playwright, poet, essayist and creative nonfiction writer. Her writing has been published in Water~Stone Review, Asian American Poetry & Writing, Kartika Review, 60 Seconds to Shine: One-minute Monologues for Men, MN Women's Press, and Utne Reader. Her stage work includes Four Destinies, first produced by Mu Performing Arts, and N/A, a solo piece the debuted at Asian Arts Initiative in Philadelphia and was remounted at Dreamland Arts in Saint Paul. The themes in her work involve place, identity, and her experience as a transracial Korean adoptee. Her influences include Suzan-Lori Parks, Young Jean Lee, and Kristina Wong.

Leo's awards include the Academy of American Poets' James Wright Prize and the Gesell Award for nonfiction. Her work has twice been nominated for a Pushcart Prize. She has received funds from the MN State Arts Board, the Blacklock Foundation, and the Arizona Commission on the Arts. She has taught at St. Catherine University and Minneapolis Community & Technical College. She received an M.F.A. in creative writing from the University of Minnesota.
