= Kung Fu: The Legend Continues =

Television series

- Created by: Ed Spielman
- Based on: Kung Fu by Ed Spielman; Jerry Thorpe; Herman Miller
- Starring: David Carradine; Chris Potter
- Narrated by: Richard Anderson
- Composer: Jeff Danna
- Countries of origin: Canada; United States
- No. of seasons: 4
- No. of episodes: 88 (list of episodes)

Production
- Executive producer: Michael Sloan
- Producers: Gavin Mitchell; Susan Murdoch; John Hackett
- Running time: 44–46 minutes
- Production company: Warner Bros. Television

Original release
- Network: Prime Time Entertainment Network
- Release: January 27, 1993 – January 1, 1997

Kung Fu: The Legend Continues is an action/crime drama series and sequel to the original 1972–75 television series Kung Fu. While the original Kung Fu series is set in the American old west, Kung Fu: The Legend Continues is set in the modern era. It stars David Carradine and Chris Potter as a father and son trained in kung fu – Carradine playing a Shaolin monk, Potter a police detective. The series aired in syndication for four seasons from January 27, 1993, to January 1, 1997, and was broadcast in over 70 countries. Filming took place in Toronto, Ontario.

The show was canceled when its producer, Prime Time Entertainment Network (also known as PTEN), ceased operations and no other producer opted to continue the series.

== Synopsis ==
Like his grandfather and namesake from the original series, Kwai Chang Caine (David Carradine) is a Shaolin priest. In 1978, Caine was the head of a temple in Northern California, where his son Peter (Chris Potter) also lived and studied, until the temple was destroyed in a fire caused by a renegade priest who believed the priests should serve as mercenaries. Because of the intervention of one of the surviving priests (who was attempting to protect them from the renegade priest, who had escaped), each believed that the other had perished in the fire and went on their separate paths; Caine wandered and traveled, much as his grandfather had, while Peter became a foster child and eventually grew up to become a police officer. The series begins 15 years after the destruction of the temple when Caine reunites with Peter after entering the Chinatown district of the city where Peter works, and now father and son work at rebuilding their relationship, with Caine becoming inadvertently involved with some of the cases on which Peter is assigned.

== Cast and characters ==
=== Main ===
- David Carradine as Kwai Chang Caine, Matthew Caine
- Chris Potter as Det. Peter Caine

=== Recurring ===
- Robert Lansing as Capt. Paul Blaisdell ("also Starring", seasons 1–2, 25 episodes).
- William Dunlop as Chief of Detectives Frank Strenlich (seasons 1–4, 54 episodes).
- Kim Chan as Lo Si "The Ancient" / Ping Hai (seasons 1–4, 54 episodes), an older Shaolin priest who is the proprietor of a Chinatown apothecary shop who becomes Caine's friend and mentor.
- Rob Moses as Master Khan (seasons 1-4, 15 episodes, 4 uncredited).
- Nathaniel Moreau as Young Peter Caine (seasons 1–3, 54 episodes, in flashbacks).
- Robert Bednarski as Younger Peter Caine (seasons 4, 12 episodes, in flashbacks).
- Belinda Metz as Det. Jody Powell (seasons 2–4, 33 episodes). Metz had previously played Det. Kira Blakemore in season one, "Shadow Assassin" prior to her new role.
- Scott Wentworth as Det. Kermit Griffin (seasons 2–4, 25 episodes)
- Kate Trotter as Capt. Karen Simms (seasons 3–4, 25 episodes)
- Sandey Grinn as Thomas Jefferson "T.J." Kincaid (seasons 3–4, 5 episodes)
- Marla Schaffel as Tyler Smith (3 episodes), Peter's former fiance and on-and-off girlfriend.

== Production ==
In 1992, the series was sold to television stations as a first-run syndicated series, alongside Time Trax. The series was originally sold as Kung Fu: The Next Generation.

The show was filmed in Canada, on location in the historic Toronto Chinatown.

== Episodes ==
Season	Episodes	Originally released	
Season	Episodes	First released	Last released
1	22	January 27, 1993	December 1, 1993
2	22	January 26, 1994	November 30, 1994
3	22	January 25, 1995	November 29, 1995
4	22	January 31, 1996	January 1, 1997

== Home media ==
On May 27, 2014, Warner Bros. released the complete first season on DVD in Region 1 in the USA only not Canada, via their Warner Archive Collection. Season 2 was released on August 18, 2015.

DVD name	Ep #	Release date
The Complete First Season	22	May 27, 2014
The Complete Second Season	22	August 18, 2015
The Complete Third Season	22	N/A
The Complete Fourth Season	22	N/A

The first season was released in Germany on DVD in 2009.

The complete series was made available by Apple VOD in High-Definition on June 22, 2026 in Canada.

== International broadcasters ==
- Sri Lanka – Sirasa TV
- Philippines – RPN Channel 9
- Canada – First-run syndication, ATV/CTV/ASN/NTV/CHCH
- USA – PTEN, first-run syndication
- Kenya – KTN
- Hungary – HBO, RTL Klub
- Indonesia – RCTI
- Poland – Polsat, TVN, TVN 7
- Czech Republic – ČT1
- Bulgaria – BNT
- France – France 2, W9
- Germany – PRO 7, Kabel 1
- Mexico – Televisa
- Brazil – SBT
