= Pan Asian Repertory Theatre =

New York City theatre group

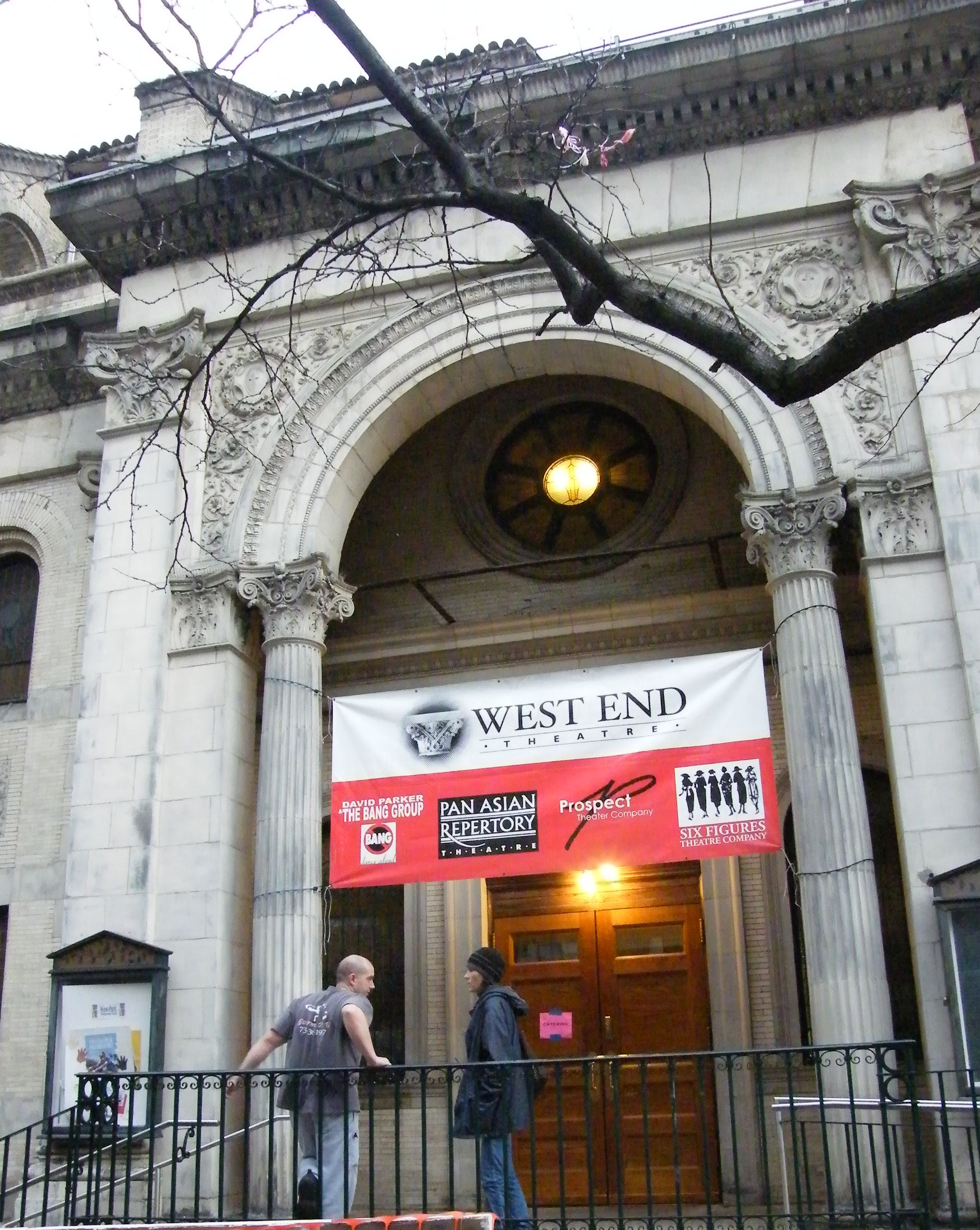
- Theatre entrance
- Formation: 1977
- Founders: Tisa Chang and Ernest Abuba
- Type: Theatre group
- Location(s): Theatre Row Building; New York City
- Artistic director: Tisa Chang
- Website: www.panasianrep.org

The Pan Asian Repertory Theatre is a New York City-based theatre group that explores the Asian-American experience and provides professional opportunities for Asian-American artists to collaborate. Pan-Asian was founded by Tisa Chang and Ernest Abuba in 1977, and Chang remains artistic director. Chang established the Pan Asian Repertory Theatre as a resident company at La MaMa Experimental Theatre Club in 1977, with the intention of popularizing Asian-American theater and leading to other similar theatre companies in cities with an Asian disaporic population. Pan-Asian's productions have received numerous accolades including Obie Awards, Drama Desk Awards, and a Theatre World Award.

Specializing in intercultural productions of new Asian-American plays, Asian classics in translation, and innovative adaptations of Western classics, some of the works Pan Asian has presented included:

- Empress of China - featuring Tina Chen in the title role of China's last dowager ruler
- Yellow Fever - continued to an Off-Broadway run
- Ghashiram Kotwal - Marathi play with music
- Teahouse - by Lao She, spanning fifty years of modern Chinese history
- Cambodia Agonistes - by Ernest Abuba, music by Louis Stewart
- The Teahouse of the August Moon - by John Patrick
- Forbidden City Blues - by Alexander Woo
- The Fan Tan King - by C. Y. Leethe, world premiere
- Yohen - by Philip Kan Gotanda
- Tea - by Velina Hasu Houston, 20th anniversary production
- Ching Chong Chinaman at the Westside Theatre
- The Brothers Paranormal by Prince Gomolvilas
- Memorial by Livian Yeh, Off-Broadway
- Warrior Sisters of Wu by Damon Chua, Off-Broadway
- My Man Kono by Philip W. Chung, Off-Broadway

Pan Asian has staged early works of writers including Momoko Iko, Wakako Yamauchi, Philip Kan Gotanda, R. A. Shiomi, and David Henry Hwang. When they established a residency program in 1987, Pan Asian became the United States' first resident Asian American theater company continuing with Chang's goal to showcase Asian American theater as having a role in the city's theater scene.

It was one of three companies to co-found and produce the first National Asian American Theater Festival, which was first held in 2007. The other two were the National Asian American Theater Company and Ma-Yi Theater Company.

== See also ==
- Asian American theatre
