= Philip Kan Gotanda =

American dramatist (born 1951)

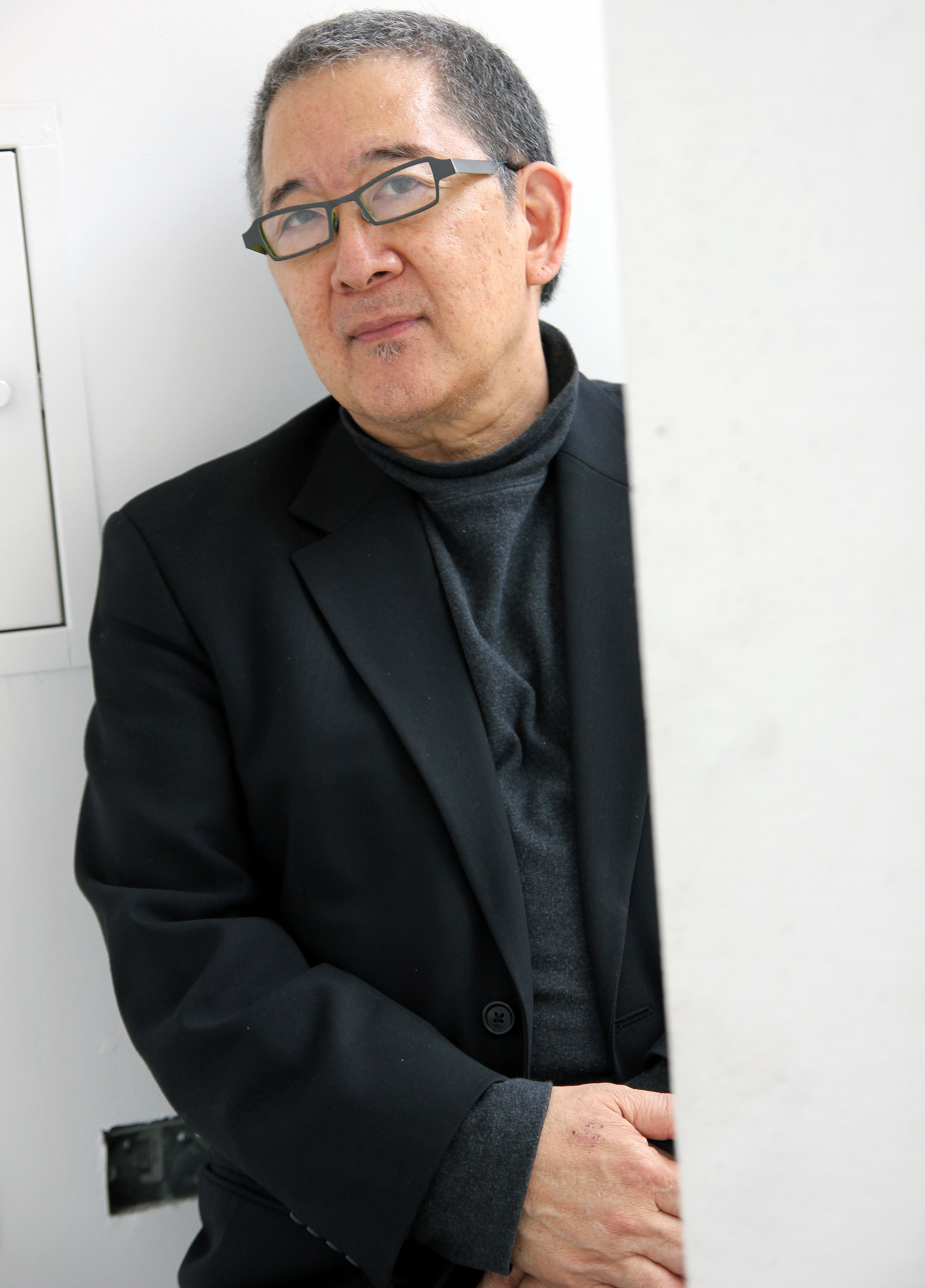
- Philip Kan Gotanda at the Great Hall at Cooper Union in Manhattan, New York for the benefit performances of Shinsai: Theaters for Japan in March 2012.
- Born: December 17, 1951 (age 74); Stockton, California
- Occupations: Playwright, filmmaker
- Spouse: Diane Takei
- Writing career
- Period: 1979–present
- Notable works: The Wash; Yankee Dawg You Die
- Notable awards: Guggenheim Fellowship; NEA Fellowship; Rockefeller Playwriting Award
- Website: www.philipkangotanda.org

Philip Kan Gotanda (born December 17, 1951) is an American playwright and filmmaker and a third generation Japanese American. Much of his work deals with Asian American issues and experiences.

== Life and career ==
Gotanda wrote the text and directed the production of Maestro Kent Nagano's Manzanar: An American Story, an original symphonic work with narration. His newest work, After the War, premiered at the American Conservatory Theater in March 2007. After the War chronicles San Francisco's Japantown in the late 1940s, when Japanese Americans returning from the internment camps encountered a flourishing African American jazz scene. A Japanese translation of his play, Sisters Matsumoto, opened in Tokyo with the Mingei Theatre Company.

Gotanda is also an independent filmmaker; his works are seen in film festivals around the world. His most recent film, Life Tastes Good, was originally presented at the Sundance Film Festival and can presently be seen on the Independent Film Channel. Along with executive producers Dale Minami and Diane Takei, he is currently developing his newest film, Inscrutable Grin, with their production company, Joe Ozu Films.

Gotanda holds a J.D. degree from Hastings College of the Law, studied pottery in Japan with the late Hiroshi Seto, and resides in Berkeley with his actress-producer wife Diane Takei. His play collections include No More Cherry Blossoms and Fish Soup and Other Plays, published by the University of Washington Press. Other published plays include The Wash, The Dream of Kitamura, Day Standing on its Head, Yohen, and The Wind Calls Mary.

Theaters where Gotanda's works have been produced include A Contemporary Theatre, American Conservatory Theater, American Place Theater Asian American Theater Workshop Berkeley Repertory Theatre, Campo Santo+Intersection, East West Players, Eureka Theater, The Group Theater, La Mama, Manhattan Theatre Club, Mark Taper Forum, Magic Theater, Mingei Geikidan – Tokyo, Missouri Rep, New Federal Theater New York Shakespeare Festival, Pan Asian Rep, Playwrights Horizons, Promenade Theater/National Theater – London, Asian American Theater Company, Robey Theatre Company, San Jose Repertory Theatre, Seattle Repertory Theatre, and South Coast Repertory.

He has been Artist-in-Residence at Stanford University, University of California, Berkeley, and Berkeley Repertory Theatre.

== Plays ==
- The Avocado Kid (musical)
- Song For a Nisei Fisherman (play with songs)
- "Bullet Headed Birds" (play with songs)
- "Jan Ken Po" (collaboration w. David Henry Hwang, Rick Shiomi)
- American Tattoo
- The Wash
- Yankee Dawg You Die
- The Dream Of Kitamura
- Fish Head Soup
- Day Standing on Its Head
- Yohen
- In the Dominion of Night (full-length spoken word play. Performed with the New Orientals, a retro jazz ensemble,)
- The Wind Cries Mary
- The Ballad of Yachiyo
- Sisters Matsumoto
- A Fist of Roses (in collaboration with Campo Santo)
- Floating Weeds
- Manzanar: An American Story (original symphonic piece with spoken narrative text – librettist)
- After the War (revised to After The War Blues in 2014)
- Under the Rainbow (evening of two one acts: Natalie Wood Is Dead; White Manifesto or Got Rice?)
- #5 The Angry Red Drum
- Child is Father to Man (short play presented by Silk Road Rising as part of "The DNA Trail")
- Apricots of Andujar (chamber opera – librettist)
- The Life and Times of Chang and Eng – The Inescapable Truth of Love That Binds
- Love in American Times
- Body of Eyes (song cycle – lyricist. Shinji Eshima, composer)
- "Night Fishing". Podcast. Collaboration with composer David Coulter.
- The Jamaican Wash (Adaptation of The Wash with a Jamaican American family)
- #CAMPTULELAKE (short play commissioned by the Goethe-Institut as part of the Plurality of Privacy in Five-Minute Plays project and produced at A.C.T. in 2017)
- Rashomon (Adaptation commissioned by Ubuntu Theater Project)
- Pool of Unknown Wonders: Undertow of the Soul
- Both Eyes Open Opera. Librettist. Composer: Max Giteck Duykers
- West of Grove Street. A Play About Old Love. Dying. And The Crossing of Red Lines.

== Films ==
- The Wash (1988) — screenplay
- The Kiss (1992 short) — director, screenplay, actor
- Drinking Tea (short) — director, screenplay
- Life Tastes Good (1999) — director, screenplay, actor
- The Other Barrio (2015) — actor

== Awards and honors ==
- Dramatist Guild Foundation Legacy Playwrights Award
- American Academy of Arts and Sciences Inductee 2023
- Guggenheim Fellowship
- Pew Charitable Trust
- John D. Rockefeller 3rd Award
- Lila Wallace
- National Endowment for the Arts
- National Endowment for the Arts – Theater Communications Playwriting Award
- A PEN Center West Award
- LA Music Center Award
- 2007 Japan Society of Northern California Award
- A Chinese For Affirmative Action Award
- National Japanese American Historical Society
- City of Stockton Arts Award
- East West Players' Visionary Award
- Asian American Theater Company Life Time Achievement
- 2 California Civil Liberties Public Education Program
- 2009 MAP Fund Creative Exploration Grant
- 2008 Granada Arts Theater Fellowship
- UC Berkeley Arts Center Fellow in Theater
- Sundance Theater Fellow
- Sundance Film Fellow Program
- Inaugural recipient of the Legacy Playwrights Initiative Award alongside Ed Bullins and Constance Congdon (December 2020)

== See also ==
- List of Asian American writers
- Japanese American internment
