= List of Kung Fu: The Legend Continues episodes =

The following is a list of episodes for first-run syndicated action/crime drama Kung Fu: The Legend Continues. The series premiered on January 27, 1993, and ended on January 1, 1997. A total of 88 episodes were produced spanning 4 seasons.

== Series overview ==
| Season | Episodes | Originally released | |
| Season | Episodes | First released | Last released |
|---|---|---|---|
| 1 | 22 | January 27, 1993 | December 1, 1993 |
| 2 | 22 | January 26, 1994 | November 30, 1994 |
| 3 | 22 | January 25, 1995 | November 29, 1995 |
| 4 | 22 | January 31, 1996 | January 1, 1997 |

== Episodes ==
=== Season 1 (1993) ===
| No. overall | No. in season | Title | Directed by | Written by | Original release date |
|---|---|---|---|---|---|
| 1 | 1 | "Initiation: Parts 1 & 2" | Jud Taylor | Story by : Michael Sloan & Ed Waters; Teleplay by : Michael Sloan | January 27, 1993 |
| 2 | 2 | "Initiation: Parts 1 & 2" | Jud Taylor | Story by : Michael Sloan & Ed Waters; Teleplay by : Michael Sloan | January 27, 1993 |
Fifteen years after the destruction of his Shaolin Temple, Kwai Chang Caine comes to a major city's Chinatown, where he is unexpectedly reunited with the son he had believed dead and who is now an undercover cop infiltrating a major Chinese criminal organization.
| 3 | 3 | "Shadow Assassin" | Allan Kroeker | Story by : Stephen Lord & Michael Sloan; Teleplay by : Michael Sloan | February 3, 1993 |
A writer has unintentionally exposed the secrets of an assassin's guild in his book. Caine and Peter must save the writer's life by stopping the assassins from taking revenge.
| 4 | 4 | "Sunday at the Hotel with George" | Allan Kroeker | Michael Sloan | February 10, 1993 |
Captain Blaisedell's daughter and Peter's foster sister is getting married, and Caine is one of the guests at the reception. Unfortunately, a major robbery is taking place simultaneously in the same hotel, and Caine and Peter must work together to resolve the situation without causing a panic among the other guests.
| 5 | 5 | "Sacred Trust" | Joseph L. Scanlan | Maurice Hurley | February 17, 1993 |
When a relative of the Ancient One, whom he was sworn to protect, is murdered, the Ancient One blames himself and decides to forfeit his own life in expiation. Now Caine must save his friend by uncovering the truth.
| 6 | 6 | "Force of Habit" | Peter Crane | Phil Bedard & Larry Lalonde | February 24, 1993 |
While teaching self-defense to a teenage bullying victim and his mother, Caine learns the woman is being abused by her husband (Kim Coates) - who happens to be Peter's new partner.
| 7 | 7 | "Pai Gow" | Zale Dalen | John Considine | March 3, 1993 |
A gambling game with the highest stakes - life and death - is the source of horrific murders. Caine and his son must beat the murderer at his own rigged game and bring him to justice.
| 8 | 8 | "Challenge" | Graeme Campbell | Robert McCullough | March 10, 1993 |
The renegade Shaolin priest Tan returns and kidnaps the Ancient One to force Caine into a final confrontation.
| 9 | 9 | "Disciple" | Allan Kroeker | Maurice Hurley | March 17, 1993 |
| 10 | 10 | "Rain's Only Friend" | Mario Azzopardi | Maurice Hurley | March 31, 1993 |
After Peter accidentally shoots an innocent bystander, he questions his profession and identity as a police officer. With the help of his father and police partner, he realizes his destiny.
| 11 | 11 | "Secret Place" | William Shatner | Michael Sloan | April 7, 1993 |
Peter enters a school bus full of children that has been taken hostage by a man suffering from multiple personality disorder and attempts to gain the trust of the hostage-taker.
| 12 | 12 | "Dragon's Eye" | George Mendeluk | Phil Bedard & Larry Lalonde | April 14, 1993 |
Caine must secure The Dragon's Eye, a secret herb, to save a young girl's life, but a madman is controlling the woods where the herb can be found and confronts Caine.
| 13 | 13 | "Blind Eye" | René Bonnière | Michael Sloan | May 5, 1993 |
| 14 | 14 | "The Lacquered Box" | Paul Lynch | Maurice Hurley | May 12, 1993 |
| 15 | 15 | "Illusion" | Peter Crane | Phil Bedard & Larry Lalonde | May 19, 1993 |
| 16 | 16 | "Straitjacket" | Jorge Montesi | John Considine | May 26, 1993 |
| 17 | 17 | "Reunion" | Bill Corcoran | Robert McCullough | October 27, 1993 |
A woman Caine once taught at the Temple when a young girl is now trying to escape the life of organized crime, but becomes a target when she witnesses a murder. The police want to put her into protective custody, but she won't testify unless Caine is her protector.
| 18 | 18 | "Dragonswing" | Paul Shapiro | Michael Sloan | November 3, 1993 |
| 19 | 19 | "Shaman" | Jeff Woolnough | Robert Bielak | November 10, 1993 |
| 20 | 20 | "I Never Promised You a Rose Garden" | John Wood | Michael Sloan | November 17, 1993 |
| 21 | 21 | "Redemption: Part 1" | Zale Dalen | Maurice Hurley | November 24, 1993 |
| 22 | 22 | "Redemption: Part 2" | Allan Kroeker | Robert McCullough | December 1, 1993 |

=== Season 2 (1994) ===
| No. overall | No. in season | Title | Original release date |
|---|---|---|---|
| 23 | 1 | "Return of the Shadow Assassin" | January 26, 1994 |
The Shadow Assassin defeated by Caine in Season One returns...only now he is accompanied by his own Master. Guest star: George Lazenby
| 24 | 2 | "May I Ride with You" | February 2, 1994 |
In order to better understand his son, Caine requests an official "ride-along" with Peter, resulting in unusual situations.
| 25 | 3 | "Dragon's Daughter" | February 9, 1994 |
| 26 | 4 | "An Ancient Lottery" | February 16, 1994 |
The Ancient wins the lottery, and the large amount of money involved attracts lots of people...not all of them honest.
| 27 | 5 | "Laurie's Friend" | February 23, 1994 |
| 28 | 6 | "Temple" | March 2, 1994 |
Caine and Peter travel back to their ruined temple. While Peter comes to terms with his past, he and Caine also find that some things and people in the town haven't changed in the intervening years.
| 29 | 7 | "Only the Strong Survive" | March 9, 1994 |
| 30 | 8 | "Out of the Woods" | March 16, 1994 |
Caine and Peter's vacation in the woods is interrupted by both a party of lost hikers and a escaped convict and his equally dangerous sons.
| 31 | 9 | "Tournament" | April 20, 1994 |
| 32 | 10 | "The Bardo" | April 27, 1994 |
| 33 | 11 | "The Possessed" | May 4, 1994 |
An exorcism goes horribly wrong and the demon begins possessing other people.
| 34 | 12 | "Warlord" | May 11, 1994 |
| 35 | 13 | "The Innocent" | May 18, 1994 |
The last thing Peter and the rest of the precinct expect to find out is that Caine has been summoned for jury duty. Naturally, when he is selected as a juror in a murder trial, what was supposedly a straight-forward case develops plenty of twists.
| 36 | 14 | "Magic Trick" | May 25, 1994 |
| 37 | 15 | "Aspects of the Soul" | October 12, 1994 |
| 38 | 16 | "Kundela" | October 19, 1994 |
Peter is dating an Australian tennis player whose father plans to build a uranium mine on Aboriginal sacred burial land. When a death spell is cast on the girl in retaliation, Peter must call on his father for help.
| 39 | 17 | "The Gang of Three" | October 26, 1994 |
| 40 | 18 | "Sunday at the Museum with George" | November 2, 1994 |
The same man who sought to rob the hotel at Blaisdell's daughter's wedding is back, intending to rob the Museum. The problem is, the exhibit he seeks is cursed.
| 41 | 19 | "Dragonswing II" | November 9, 1994 |
| 42 | 20 | "Sing Wah" | November 16, 1994 |
| 43 | 21 | "Enter the Tiger" | November 23, 1994 |
| 44 | 22 | "Retribution" | November 30, 1994 |

=== Season 3 (1995) ===
| No. overall | No. in season | Title | Original release date |
|---|---|---|---|
| 45 | 1 | "Rite of Passage" | January 25, 1995 |
| 46 | 2 | "Plague" | February 1, 1995 |
| 47 | 3 | "May I Walk with You" | February 8, 1995 |
In a reversal from Season 2, now it's Peter's turn to accompany Caine for the day, only to find that the daily routine of a Shaolin priest is far from ordinary or boring.
| 48 | 4 | "The Return of Sing Ling" | February 15, 1995 |
| 49 | 5 | "Manhunt" | February 22, 1995 |
| 50 | 6 | "Gunfighters" | March 1, 1995 |
When his grandfather is shot back in the early 20th century, the modern-day Caine mystically switches places with his ancestor and travels back through time to rescue his kidnapped grandmother and Caine's father as a child. Featuring the original Caine and Cheyenne Bodie.
| 51 | 7 | "A Chinatown Murder Mystery: The Case of the Poison Hand" | April 26, 1995 |
| 52 | 8 | "Target" | May 3, 1995 |
| 53 | 9 | "Citizen Caine" | May 10, 1995 |
| 54 | 10 | "Quake!" | May 17, 1995 |
| 55 | 11 | "Goodbye, Mr. Caine" | May 24, 1995 |
| 56 | 12 | "The Sacred Chalice of I Ching" | July 5, 1995 |
| 57 | 13 | "Eye Witness" | July 26, 1995 |
| 58 | 14 | "Demons" | October 4, 1995 |
| 59 | 15 | "Deadly Fashion" | October 11, 1995 |
Peter is assigned to bodyguard a supermodel, but is totally unprepared when he meets and recognizes a certain famed and flashy French fashion designer.
| 60 | 16 | "Cruise Missiles" | October 18, 1995 |
| 61 | 17 | "The Promise" | October 25, 1995 |
| 62 | 18 | "Flying Fists of Fury II: Masters of Illusion" | November 1, 1995 |
Peter is the dead ringer for an obnoxious and arrogant movie star, so naturally he is assigned to impersonate the actor when someone is out to kill him.
| 63 | 19 | "Banker's Hours" | November 8, 1995 |
Caine's escorting his friend to the bank becomes far from ordinary when a gang of thieves take over the bank and hold everyone hostage.
| 64 | 20 | "Kung Fu Blues" | November 15, 1995 |
| 65 | 21 | "Brotherhood of the Bell" | November 22, 1995 |
| 66 | 22 | "Destiny" | November 29, 1995 |

=== Season 4 (1996–97) ===
| No. overall | No. in season | Title | Original release date |
|---|---|---|---|
| 67 | 1 | "Dark Vision" | January 31, 1996 |
| 68 | 2 | "The First Temple" | February 7, 1996 |
| 69 | 3 | "Circle of Light" | February 14, 1996 |
| 70 | 4 | "Prism" | February 21, 1996 |
| 71 | 5 | "Black Widow" | February 28, 1996 |
| 72 | 6 | "Shaolin Shot" | April 24, 1996 |
| 73 | 7 | "The Phoenix" | May 1, 1996 |
| 74 | 8 | "Special Forces" | May 8, 1996 |
| 75 | 9 | "Dragon's Lair" | May 15, 1996 |
| 76 | 10 | "Veil of Tears" | May 22, 1996 |
| 77 | 11 | "Chill Ride" | October 2, 1996 |
| 78 | 12 | "Escape" | October 9, 1996 |
| 79 | 13 | "Who Is Kwai Chang Caine?" | October 16, 1996 |
| 80 | 14 | "Storm Warning" | October 23, 1996 |
| 81 | 15 | "A Shaolin Treasure" | October 30, 1996 |
| 82 | 16 | "Dark Side of the Chi" | November 6, 1996 |
| 83 | 17 | "Ancient Love" | November 13, 1996 |
| 84 | 18 | "Blackout" | November 20, 1996 |
| 85 | 19 | "Time Prisoners" | November 27, 1996 |
| 86 | 20 | "Requiem" | December 4, 1996 |
| 87 | 21 | "A Shaolin Christmas" | December 25, 1996 |
| 88 | 22 | "May I Talk with You" | January 1, 1997 |
