= Randall Duk Kim =

American actor (born 1943)

- Born: September 24, 1943 (age 83); Honolulu, Hawaii
- Other name: Randy Kim
- Education: University of Hawaii
- Occupations: Actor, artistic director
- Years active: 1960–present
- Known for: Co-founding American Players Theatre; Playing the Keymaker in The Matrix; Voicing Master Oogway in Kung Fu Panda
- Spouse: Anne Occhiogrosso

Korean name
- Hangul: 김덕문
- Hanja: 金德文
- RR: Gim Deokmun
- MR: Kim Tŏngmun

Randall Duk Kim (born September 24, 1943) is an American actor. On stage, he is known both for his extensive classical repertoire and as an interpreter of the works of playwright Frank Chin. He is the co-founder of the American Players Theatre. To film audiences, he is best known for his portrayal of the Keymaker in The Matrix franchise, and as the voice of Master Oogway in the Kung Fu Panda franchise. He is an Obie Award winner and an Outer Critics Circle Award nominee.

== Early life ==
Kim was born to a fundamentalist Baptist family of Chinese and Korean descent. He grew up on a farm near the Koko Head Crater. He developed an interest in acting as a child after seeing the musical Oklahoma! at the Honolulu Community Theatre. In high school, he often watched plays at the University of Hawaii. After graduating high school, while visiting family in San Diego, he visited the Old Globe Theatre where he saw The Merchant of Venice, Twelfth Night, and Richard III. He credited Morris Carnovsky for inspiring him to become an actor.

In 1964, Kim and his friend Charles Bright moved to New York City to become professional actors. Bright became an apprentice with the Association of Producing on the Phoenix at 74th Street. Kim and Bright befriended the house manager and the house manager gave Kim unsold seats at shows. Kim spent time in London from 1966 to 1967. He worked part-time and watched shows from the Royal Shakespeare Company.

== Career ==
=== Theater ===
Kim began doing theater when he was 18 years old. He has portrayed a wide variety of roles on the stage, focusing upon Western classical works, including Shakespeare, Chekhov, Ibsen and Molière. He has spent most of his career in theater.

Kim starred in the first play written by an Asian American to be produced professionally in New York, The Chickencoop Chinaman by Frank Chin, which was mounted by The American Place Theatre in 1972.

Kim co-founded the American Players Theatre in Spring Green, Wisconsin with Anne Occhiogrosso and Charles Bright in 1977. He was the theater's artistic director.

In 1974, Kim starred in Chin's second play, The Year of the Dragon. Also that year, he became one of the first Asian-American actors to play a leading role in an American production of a Shakespeare play when he played the title role in The New York Public Theater's 1974 production of Pericles, Prince of Tyre. Kim played the title role in Hamlet at the Guthrie Theatre in 1978–79.

He played Kralahome in the 1996 revival of The King and I on Broadway, later succeeding to the leading role. Other Broadway credits include Golden Child and the revised version of Flower Drum Song, both written by David Henry Hwang.

=== Film and television ===
Kim played the part of General Alak in the 1999 movie Anna and the King. Kim portrayed the Keymaker in the film The Matrix Reloaded (2003). He was originally asked by casting director Mali Finn for the role. In 2008, he played mathematician Dashiell Kim in the episode "The Equation" of the television series Fringe. He played Grandpa Gohan in the live action Dragonball Evolution (2009). Kim voiced Po's and Shifu’s teacher, Grand Master Oogway, in Kung Fu Panda (2008) and Kung Fu Panda 3 (2016).

== Personal life ==
He is married to actress and fellow American Players Theatre co-founder, Anne Occhiogrosso.

== Filmography ==
=== Film ===
Year	Title	Role	Notes
1970	The Hawaiians	Asia at 19	Uncredited
1970	Tora! Tora! Tora!	Tadao - Japanese Messenger Boy	Unconfirmed; uncredited
1974	Nourish the Beast	Actor	Credited as Randy Kim; television film
1995	Prisoners in Time	Nagase Takashi	Television film
1998	The Replacement Killers	Alan Chan	
1998	The Thin Red Line	Nisei Interpreter	Uncredited
1999	Anna and the King	General Alak	
2001	The Lost Empire	Shu	
2003	MTV Movie Awards Reloaded	Keymaker	Short television film
2003	The Matrix Reloaded	Keymaker	
2005	Memoirs of a Geisha	Dr. Crab	
2006	Falling for Grace	Mr. Hung	
2007	Tailor Made	Wong	Short film
2007	Year of the Fish	Auntie Yaga/Old Man/Foreman	
2008	Kung Fu Panda	Master Oogway	Voice
2008	Secrets of the Furious Five	Master Oogway	Voice
2009	Dragonball Evolution	Grandpa Gohan	
2009	Ninja Assassin	Tattoo Master	
2010	The Last Airbender	Old Man in Temple	
2011	Kung Fu Panda: Secrets of the Masters	Master Oogway	Voice
2014	John Wick	Continental Doctor	
2016	Kung Fu Panda 3	Master Oogway	Voice
2019	John Wick: Chapter 3 – Parabellum	Continental Doctor	

=== TV series ===
Year	Title	Role	Notes
1968–1969	Hawaii Five-O	Eddie/John Lo/Oscar	3 episodes
2001	100 Centre Street	Pham Van Trong	Episode: "Hostage"
2006	Thief	Uncle Lau	3 episodes
2008	Cashmere Mafia	John Mason	Episode: "The Deciders"
2008	New Amsterdam	Donald Chen	Episode: "Legacy"
2008	Fringe	Dashiell Kim	Episode: "The Equation"
2011	Kung Fu Panda: Legends of Awesomeness	Master Oogway	Voice, 2 episodes
2012	Person of Interest	Mr. Han	Episode: "Many Happy Returns"
2012	Elementary	Old Man	Episode: "You Do It Yourself"
2022	The Boys Presents: Diabolical	John	Voice, episode: "John and Sun-Hee"
2024–2026	Avatar: The Last Airbender	Wan Shi Tong	Voice, 2 episodes

=== Video games ===
List of voice performances in video games
Year	Title	Role
2003	Enter the Matrix	Keymaker
2005	Red Ninja: End of Honor	Shingen
2007	Stranglehold	James Wong
2015	Kung Fu Panda: Showdown of Legendary Legends	Master Oogway
2023	DreamWorks All-Star Kart Racing	Master Oogway
