= The Iron Moonhunter =

1977 children's picture book by Kathleen Chang

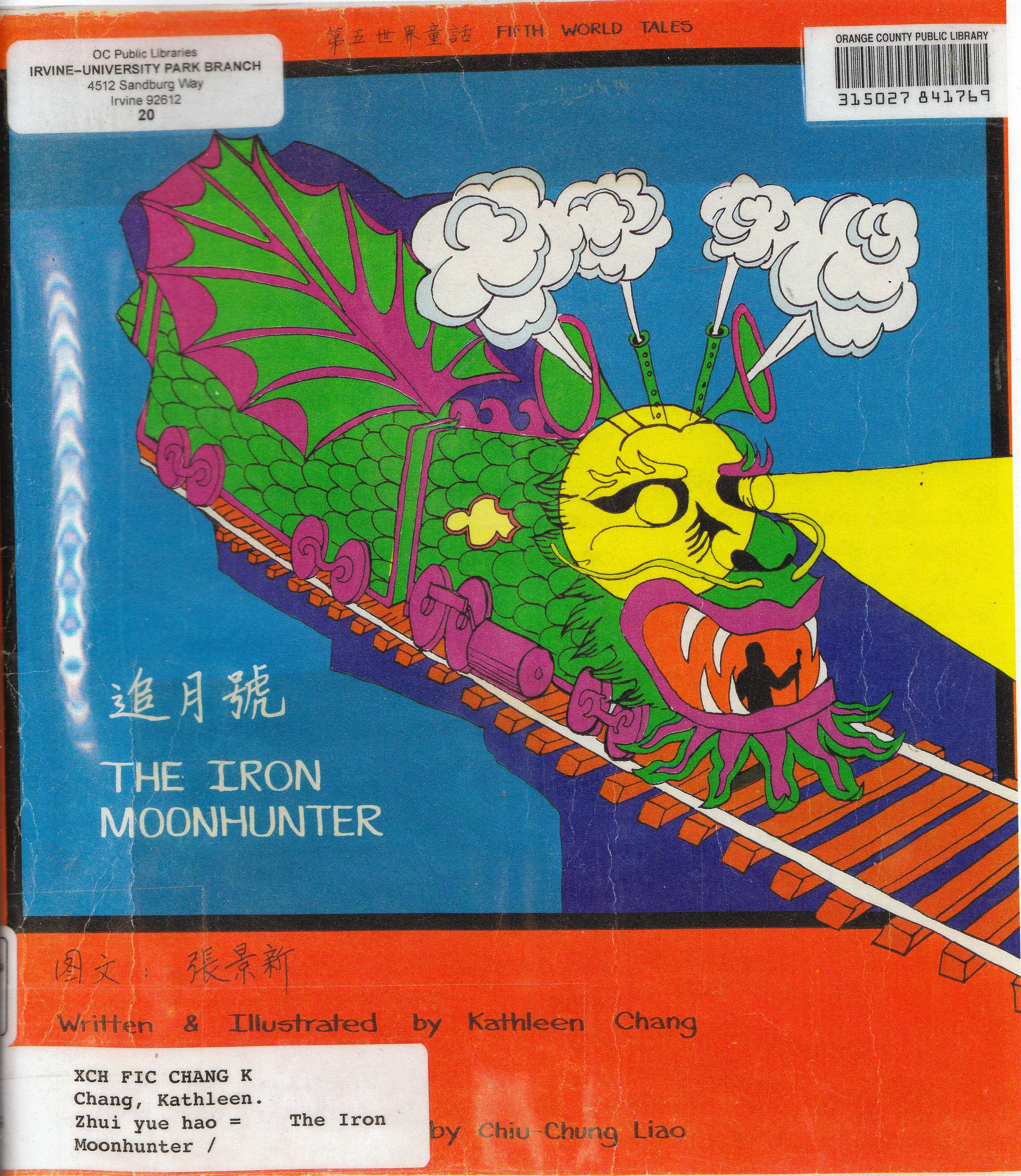
- Author: Kathleen Chang
- Cover artist: Kathleen Chang
- Language: English, Chinese
- Genre: Children's Literature
- Publisher: Children's Book Press
- Publication date: 1977
- Media type: Print (Paperback)
- ISBN: 0-89239-011-5
- Website: Complete book at Internet Archive

The Iron Moonhunter (Chinese: 追月號; pinyin: Zhuī yuè hào; Jyutping: Zeoi1 jyut6 hou6) is a short children's picture book published in 1977, written and illustrated by the activist Kathleen Chang. The book purportedly retells a Chinese-American myth set in the Sierra Nevada mountains during the construction of the First transcontinental railroad, starting in the fall of 1866.

== Synopsis ==
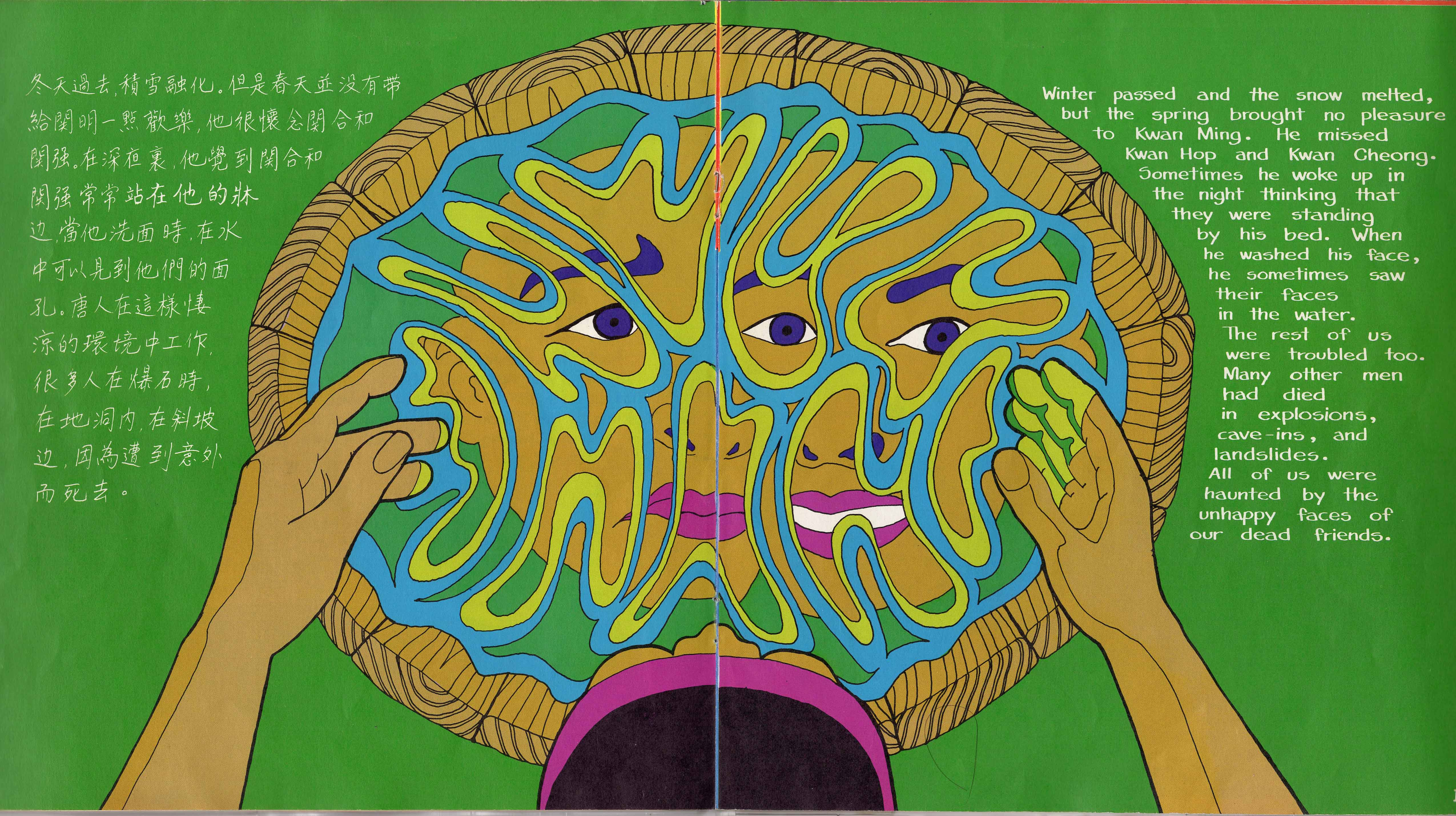
Kwan Ming sees the faces of his cousins

Chinese laborers that were hired to work in America received a hostile reception from white competition upon their arrival in San Francisco. While building the Central Pacific portion of the Transcontinental Railroad, an explosion set by white rivals killed several Chinese workers. The three Kwan cousins (Kwan Ming, Kwan Cheong, and Kwan Hop) fought back, finding and punishing the guilty, but modestly stated they were only living up to the legacy of their ancestor, Kwan Kung.

Accidents later claimed the lives of two cousins; first, while setting blasting charges, Kwan Hop fell to his death after the rope securing his basket broke; in the ensuing winter of 1866–67, Kwan Cheong was trapped in a collapsed tunnel that had been dug to connect the work site with the camp site through snow 40 feet (12 m) deep. The following spring, the Chinese workers began to see the restless spirits of their comrades who had died while working on the railroads.

One worker, Jeong Yum, erupted with hatred and agitated the men to blow up the railroad and rebel against their white supervisors. Kwan Ming instead counseled patience and pride: "Talk sense, men. The railroad is our work and we should be proud of it. We're going to finish it because when we Tong Yun say we'll do something, we don't stop halfway." He laid out a plan to build a railroad for the spirits, using leftover steel rails and scrap metal from crashed trains to build the Iron Moonhunter, a dragon-shaped train, which played a song to alert the restless spirits:

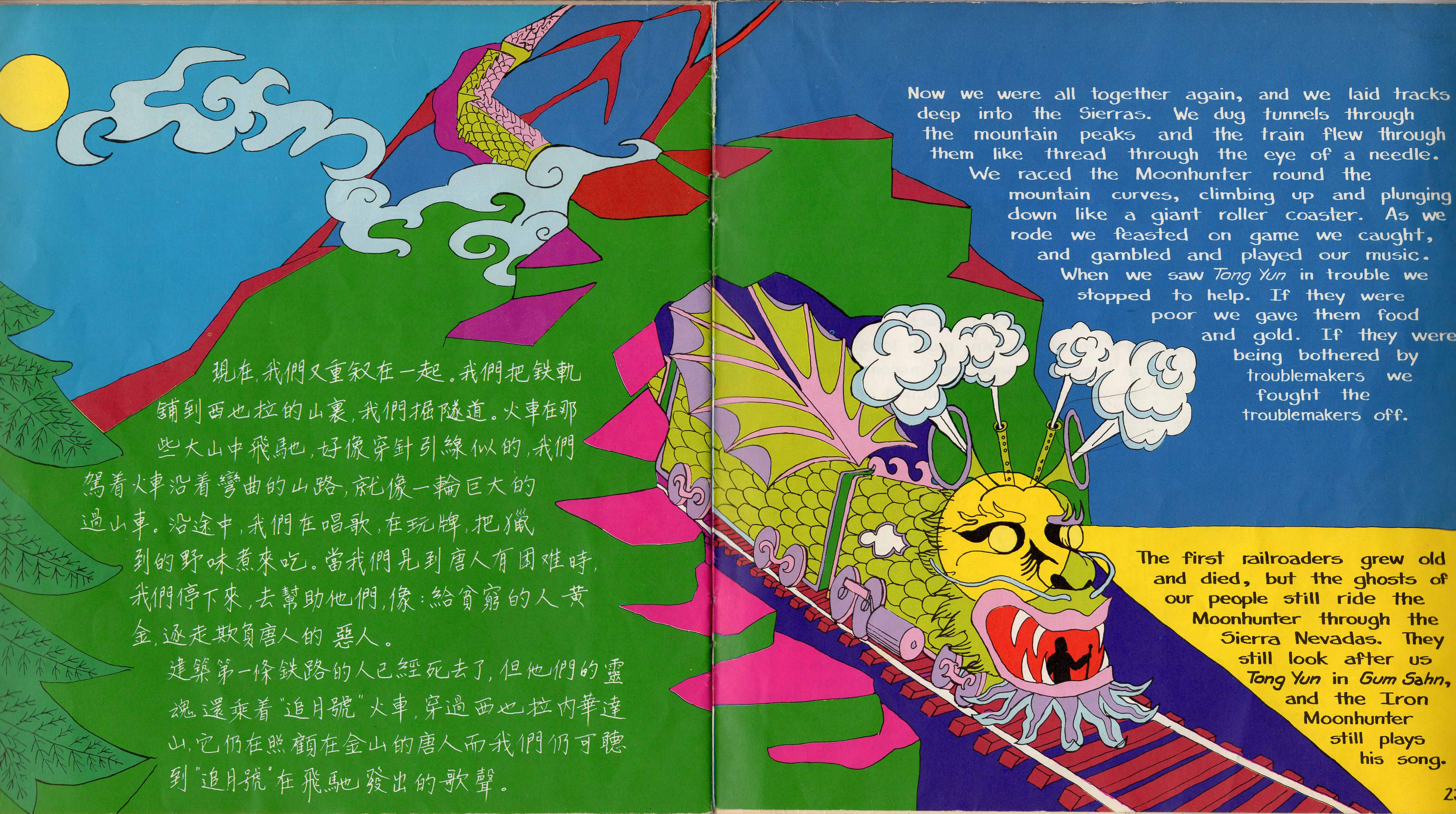
The Iron Moonhunter rides through the mountains

I am the thunder of the mountains.
I am the winds that croon to the moon.
I am the laughter that rides the winds.
I am the Moonhunter singing my tune.
Come along when you hear my song.
Come along, come along.

— Kathleen Chang, The Iron Moonhunter (1977), p.22

After reuniting the spirits with their loved ones, the workers continued to build track throughout the Sierra, stopping the train to help the needy. According to the legend, the Iron Moonhunter still plies the tracks, helping the Chinese in America.

== Development ==
The Iron Moonhunter is based on an old legend that still circulates in Chinese America: that the Chinese American railroaders built a railroad of their own while they were building the Central Pacific Railroad. Perhaps it's a fairy tale our grandparents concocted so we would think of the bitter past with wonder and pride; perhaps it's an explanation of abandoned railroad tracks in the Sierras that seem to lead nowhere; and perhaps it's true.

— Kathleen Chang, author's note (1977)

Chang states The Iron Moonhunter comes from a legend passed down from the time of the Transcontinental Railroad. However, the first known appearance of the Iron Moonhunter is in Frank Chin's play The Chickencoop Chinaman (1972), where Tam Lum explains it is a "train built by Chinamans who knew they'd never be given passes to ride the rails they laid", a "wild engine to take them home" built from stolen iron and steel. Sau-ling Cynthia Wong speculates that as it is supposedly based on an unpublished private oral history, the Iron Moonhunter may have been invented by Chin, who was married to Chang in the early 1970s.

=== Publication history ===
- — (1977). The Iron Moonhunter (1st, pb ed.). San Francisco: Children's Book Press. ISBN 0-89239-011-5.
- — Wiesner, David (illus.) (October 1993). "The Iron Moonhunter". In Cohn, Amy L. (ed.). From Sea to Shining Sea: A Treasury of American Folklore and Folk Songs. New York City: Scholastic. pp. 164–167. ISBN 0-590-42868-3. "iron moonhunter."

According to the book's copyright page, the original text and illustrations passed into the public domain in 1987.

== Legacy ==
The Iron Moonhunter was dramatized by Calleen Sinnette Jennings, Mary Hall Surface, Eric Wilson (book & lyrics); Deirdre Kelly Lavrakas (concept); and Deborah Wicks La Puma (music & lyrics) as part of Walking the Winds: American Tales, an original musical which was commissioned by the Kennedy Center, where it premiered in 1996.

Curtis Choy's production company, Chonk Moonhunter, takes part of its name from the legend of the Iron Moonhunter.
