= Kathy Change =

American political activist, writer, and performance artist

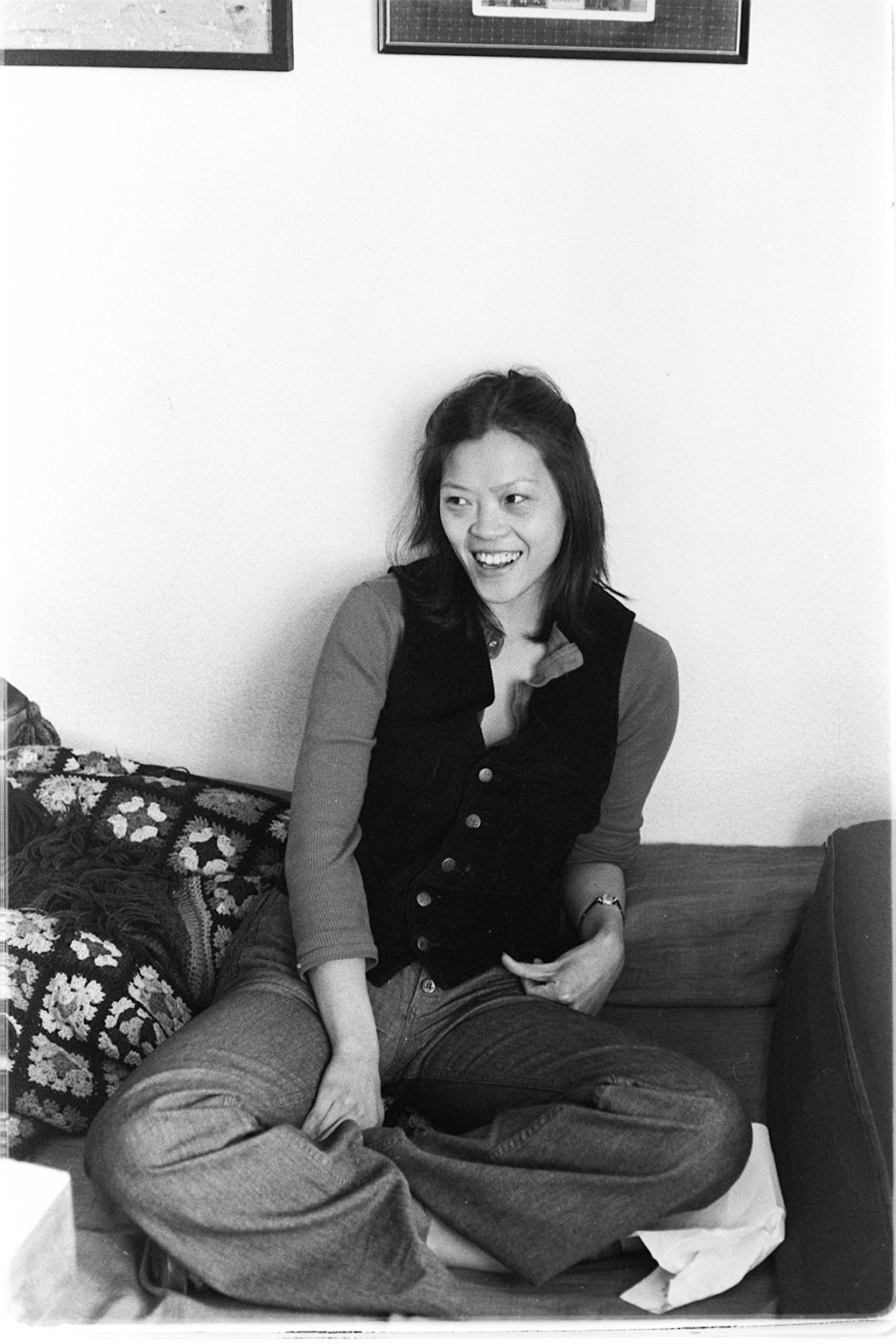
- Change in 1975
- Born: October 10, 1950; Ohio, U.S.
- Died: October 22, 1996 (aged 46); Philadelphia, Pennsylvania, U.S.
- Cause of death: Burns from self-immolation
- Other name: Kathleen Chang
- Spouse: Frank Chin (m. 1971; div. 1976)
- Website: Official website

Kathleen Chang (October 10, 1950 – October 22, 1996), known by her performance name Kathy Change, was an American political activist, writer, and performance artist. She was a familiar figure on the University of Pennsylvania campus, often dancing on the College Green brandishing homemade flags painted with various political messages and vocally advocating nonviolent social revolution. On October 22, 1996, she committed suicide by self-immolation on the spot where she had often performed in an effort to engage Penn students in the progressive causes she championed; the packages of writings she delivered to six Penn students, two local residents, as well as Penn's campus newspaper and other news organizations contextualized her carefully planned suicide as both protest and a vehicle for her message.

She changed her performance name to Kathy Change to indicate her commitment to political and social change. She was the daughter of Chinese academics who emigrated to America in the wake of the Chinese Communist Revolution. Change was married to writer Frank Chin for five years.

== Life ==
Change was born Kathleen Chang in Ohio in 1950. Her father, Sheldon Chang, was an engineer and a professor at the State University at Stony Brook, Long Island, New York. Her mother Gertrude (née Hung) was a writer. Her mother's father, William Hung, was an instructor and Dean of Yenching University and later taught at Harvard. He was instrumental in the establishment of the Harvard-Yenching Institute. She had one brother. Her parents divorced while she was a teenager, leading to Chang's first suicide attempt. Her mother committed suicide when Kathy was 14 years old.

Change graduated from the Bronx High School of Science in 1967 in New York City and briefly attended Mills College and the Bronx campus of New York University. After she married Frank Chin in 1971, she returned to California. Her marriage lasted five years, and she attempted suicide again after it ended.

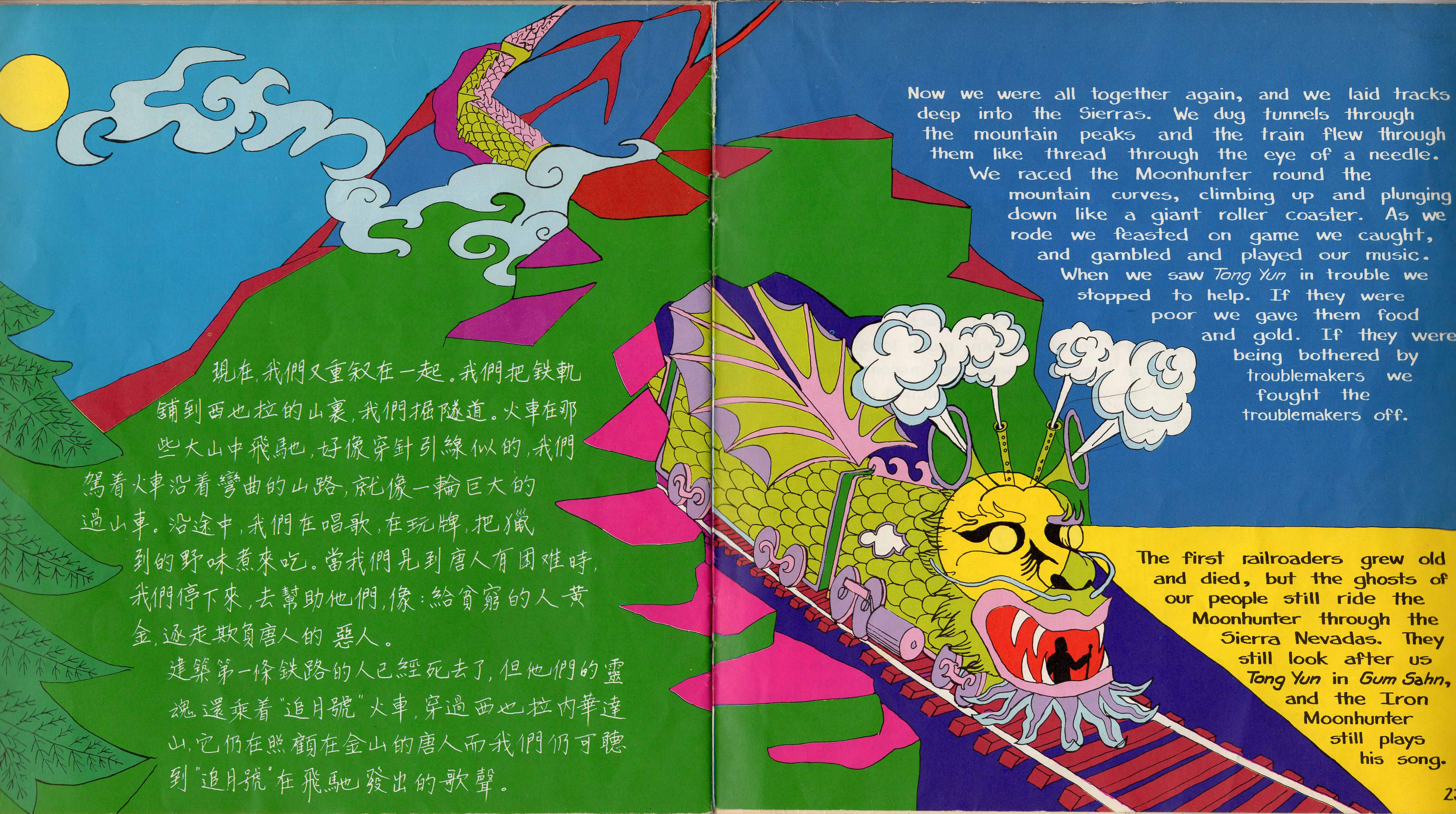
The Iron Moonhunter (1977)

In 1977, she wrote and illustrated a 24-page children's book, The Iron Moonhunter. The book purportedly retells a legend handed down by Chinese workers of the Central Pacific Railroad working on the First transcontinental railroad in the 19th century; the titular train was built using salvaged steel to rescue the restless spirits of workers who had died during construction in harsh mountain conditions.

In 1981, Change moved to Philadelphia. Around this time, her life became increasingly defined by her political activism and by what many observers would term mental illness. The New York Times noted that she had seen psychiatrists off and on for her adult life, although friends were unaware if a specific illness had been diagnosed. For a brief period in the early 1980s, she squatted in an abandoned Philadelphia building with others in the Powelton Village neighborhood on the edge of Drexel University campus. She also lived for a while nearby on Spring Garden Street.

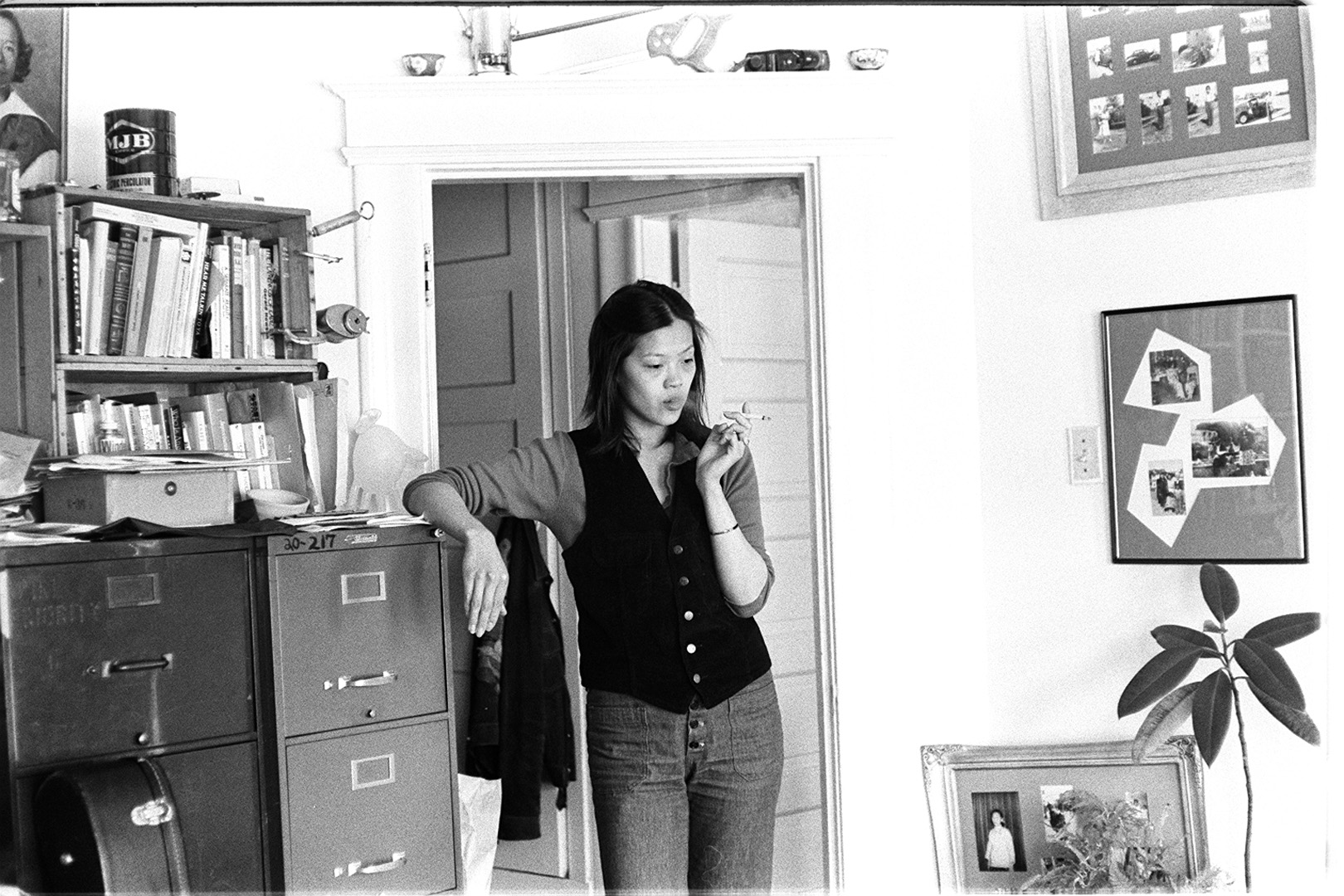
In her San Francisco apartment (1975).

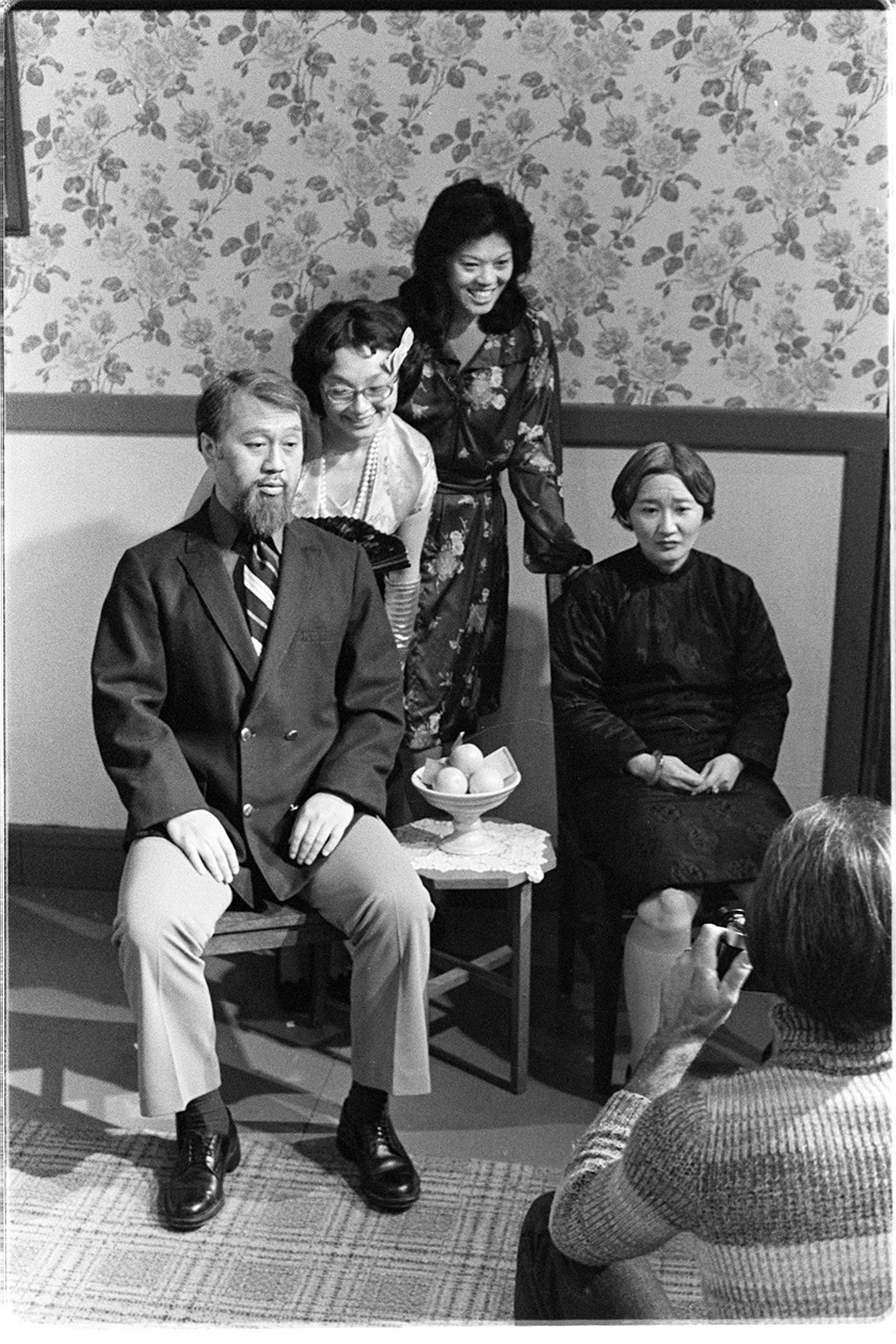
As "Sissy" (standing) in a 1978 San Francisco Asian American Theater Workshop production of The Year of the Dragon, a play by Frank Chin.

Photographs by Nancy Wong.

Around this time, she added an "e" to her last name, and informally changed her name to Kathy Change. By 1996, she had legally adopted the name Change.

== Activism ==
Change was drawn to political activism for diverse causes for most of her adult life. In 1990, she was named "Freedom Fighter of the Month" by High Times magazine, recognizing her activism for cannabis legalization. For 15 years she gave colorful one-woman street performances on Penn's campus and around Philadelphia to protest the government, during which she danced, sang, played the guitar and electronic keyboard, waved handmade flags, and made speeches. These performances included a weekly presentation on Sunday afternoons at the Philadelphia Museum of Art. In the final years of her Art Museum performances, she was joined by singer/songwriter David Downing, who wrote "Stop the Business (Transformation Day)," an anthem for her political movement.

Change founded and led the Transformation Party, a political party that advocated a complete change of the government and society. An "emergency economy" would be created by workers in essential industries, which would allow the majority of citizens to form a more representative democracy.

== Death ==
I've tried to do this several times before,
And failed.
If this is the right thing to do,
Heaven help me.

If not,
Well,
Never mind. I'll be seeing you around.

— Kathy Change, "A Note to Sympathetic Penn Students," October 1996.

On October 22, 1996, at 11:20 am, Change doused herself with gasoline in front of Peace Symbol, a stainless steel sculpture (Robert Engman, 1967; installed 1983) west of the Van Pelt Library and set herself on fire. Flames shot ten feet in the air as she danced in front of approximately fifty onlookers. Penn Police officer Bill Dailey tried to put out the flames with his jacket and was subsequently honored at a 1997 ceremony held by the school's Division of Public Safety, for attempting to prevent Change's suicide. A speech given at the event cited Dailey's "heroism under emotionally stressful and physically dangerous circumstances". After he noticed the flames from a distance and determined that a person was on fire, he attempted to extinguish the conflagration by wrapping her in his patrol jacket and rolling her on the ground. The flames restarted several times.

She was taken to the Hospital of the University of Pennsylvania with burns over 100% of her body. Change was pronounced dead at 11:48 am.

=== Rationale ===
In a packet of her writings that she delivered to The Philadelphia Inquirer, the Daily Pennsylvanian, and several friends and acquaintances (six students and two local citizens) on the morning of her death, she explained the rationale behind her suicide:

I want to protest the present government and economic system and the cynicism and passivity of the people ... as emphatically as I can. But primarily, I want to get publicity in order to draw attention to my proposal for immediate social transformation. To do this I plan to end my own life. The attention of the media is only caught by acts of violence. My moral principles prevent me from doing harm to anyone else or their property, so I must perform this act of violence against myself. ... It is a waste of energy to get angry and gripe at the government. The government must be replaced with a truly democratic self-government of, for and by the people. Those working in industries essential to maintaining life should democratically take over their workplaces and organize an emergency economy to supply the needs of the people. The rest of the people should meet in their communities to organize a new directly democratic community-based self-government.

Change felt that she "need[ed] to do something sensational that will make headline news and people will have to stop and talk about me and the message that I'm trying to put out."

== Legacy ==
A memorial is held in her honor every year on October 22 at the peace sign sculpture on the University of Pennsylvania campus where Kathy died. The memorial attracts artists, activists and performers, among others.

Percussionist/composer Kevin Norton wrote a suite for Kathy Change entitled Change Dance (Troubled Energy) in 2001 and was released late in 2001/early 2002 on the Barking Hoop label.

Industrial metal band Fear Factory wrote the song "Slave Labor" referring to her suicide; it was included in the 2004 album Archetype.

Drummer Tyshawn Sorey composed and performed "For Kathy Change," a quintet in her honor, in March 2011.

Soomi Kim wrote and performed in the biographical play "Chang(e)", directed by Suzi Takahashi, which premiered in 2013 and has had multiple performances since then, including New York City and Portland, Oregon.

Pulitzer Prize-winning playwright Quiara Alegría Hudes's 2016 play "Daphne's Dive," based in Philadelphia, features a character closely resembling Kathy Change. The play is dedicated "in memory: Kathy Chang(e)."

Shin-Fei Chen portrays Change in Andrew Repasky McElhinney’s 2019 film Casual Encounters: Philadelphia True Crime Confessions.
