= The American Place Theatre =

Off-Broadway theater

- Formation: 1963
- Founders: Wynn Handman, Sidney Lanier, Michael Tolan
- Type: Off-Broadway theatre group
- Location: New York City

The American Place Theatre was founded in 1963 by Wynn Handman, Sidney Lanier, and Michael Tolan at St. Clement's Church, 423 West 46th Street in Hell's Kitchen, New York City, and was incorporated as a not-for-profit theatre in that year. Tennessee Williams and Myrna Loy were two of the original board members.

== Achievements ==
The first full production at this off-Broadway theatre was The Old Glory, a trilogy of three one-acts by the poet Robert Lowell, produced in November 1964. The play would go on to win five Obie Awards the following year, including "Best American Play."

In addition to producing Robert Lowell's first play, The American Place Theatre has produced and developed the first plays of outstanding writers from other literary forms including Donald Barthelme, Robert Coover, Paul Goodman, H. L. Mencken, Joyce Carol Oates, S. J. Perelman, Sylvia Plath, Anne Sexton, May Swenson, and Robert Penn Warren.

Significant playwrights have been nurtured and, in many cases, initially produced at The American Place, such as:

- Sam Shepard (8 plays including one co-authored with Joseph Chaikin)
- Ronald Ribman (6)
- Steve Tesich (6)
- María Irene Fornés (4 including one produced as part of The Women’s Project)
- Ed Bullins (5)
- Phillip Hayes Dean (3)
- William Hauptman (3)
- Jonathan Reynolds (4)
- William Alfred
- Emily Mann
- Richard Nelson
- Frank Chin, the first Asian American to have plays produced by a mainstream New York company (The Chickencoop Chinaman and The Year of the Dragon)

Also, major attention has been brought to unconventional, contemporary actor/writers such as Eric Bogosian, Bill Irwin, John Leguizamo, Aasif Mandvi, and Dael Orlandersmith.

== History ==
The American Place Theatre played an important role in the emerging African-American theatre beginning in the early 1960s by producing the first productions of plays by Michael Bradford, Ed Bullins, Kia Corthron, James de Jongh, Joseph Edward, Lonne Elder III, Phillip Hayes Dean, Elaine Jackson, Alonzo D. Lamont Jr., Ron Milner, Matt Robinson, Charlie L. Russell, and Vincent Smith.

Its American Humorists' Series has transferred from the page to live performance the work of outstanding humorous writers, among them George Ade, Robert Benchley, Roy Blount Jr., A. Whitney Brown, Jules Feiffer, Bruce Jay Friedman, Cynthia Heimel, Dorothy Parker, Roger Rosenblatt, Damon Runyon, Jean Shepherd, James Thurber, and Calvin Trillin.

The theatre later moved to 111 West 46th Street. In 1978, The Women's Project, directed by Julia Miles, was designed to encourage, develop, and produce women playwrights and directors. After nine years of producing many groundbreaking works at The American Place Theatre, the project grew into a separate entity, Women's Project Theater.

Actors for whom The American Place Theatre has been a launching pad include Mary Alice, Ellen Barkin, Roscoe Lee Browne, Kathleen Chalfant, Michael Douglas, Faye Dunaway, Sandy Duncan, Morgan Freeman, Aasif Mandvi, Connie Britton, Kim Raver, Raul Julia, Mira Sorvino, Jou Jou Papailler, Anna Deaver Smith, Denzel Washington, Richard Gere, Joel Grey, Dustin Hoffman, Frank Langella, Mary McDonnell, Lauren Graham, Zakes Mokae, Howard Rollins, John Spencer, Ralph Waite, Sam Waterston, and Sigourney Weaver.

In 2002, The American Place Theatre left 111 West 46th St for other quarters. Roundabout Theatre Company began leasing the building, and it is currently known as the Harold and Miriam Steinberg Center for Theatre. The American Place Theatre moved to

== Awards ==
- Village Voice Obie Awards: Several dozen including a grant and citation for "uncompromising commitment to unconventional and daring plays" – 1982
- AUDELCO Awards for excellence in Black Theatre: Williams & Walker by Vincent Smith, Ground People by Leslie Lee, Zora Neale Hurston by Laurence Holder, and Fly by Joseph Edward
- The New England Theatre Conference Special Award for pioneering in the aiding and encouragement of the craft of playwriting for writers in other literary fields
- The Margo Jones Award – 1966

== Literature to Life ==
A new chapter for the American Place Theatre began with its first Literature to Life performance in 1994 of Toni Morrison's The Bluest Eye. Literature to Life, the American Place Theatre's performance-based literacy program, presents professionally staged verbatim adaptations of significant American literary works. This educational program gives students a new form of access to literature by bringing to life the world of books with performances that create an atmosphere of discovery and spark the imagination.

Literature to Life has received multiple grants from the Carnegie Corporation, an organization that has supported more than 550 New York City arts and social service institutions since its inception in 2002, and which was made possible through a donation by New York City mayor Michael Bloomberg.

Books that have been adapted for Literature to Life's theatrical performances include Ray Bradbury's Fahrenheit 451, Tim O'Brien's The Things They Carried, Richard Wright's Black Boy, Jonathan Safran Foer's Extremely Loud & Incredibly Close, Sue Monk Kidd's The Secret Life of Bees, Khaled Hosseini's The Kite Runner, and Lois Lowry's The Giver.

Project 451, the funding initiative of Literature to Life, was starting during the 2008/2009 season to ensure that reading, writing, and the arts remain a primary component of the education of young American citizens. Spokespeople for Project 451 include Meryl Streep, Alec Baldwin, Sam Waterston, and Jessica Lange.

The titles for the 2010/2011 season were Junot Díaz' The Brief Wondrous Life of Oscar Wao, adapted and directed by Elise Thoron, and Piri Thomas' Down These Mean Streets adapted and directed by Wynn Handman. Literature to Life's new adaptation for the 2009/2010 season was Greg Mortenson's best-selling book Three Cups of Tea. Also, adapted and directed by Wynn Handman, the show features sixty minutes of performance from this best seller.

Every year, the American Place Theatre hosts its annual Gala, the Literature to Life Awards. The 2011 Literature to Life Awards took place on May 23, 2011. They began with an adapted theatrical performance of Down These Mean Streets starring actor Jamil Mena and The Brief Wondrous Life of Oscar Wao starring Elvis Nolasco and honored Piri Thomas and Junot Díaz. The evening also included a performance written and performed by students from Newcomers High School, a high school for students who have recently immigrated to the US, in Long Island City.

== See also ==
- Stage works of Paul Goodman § Jonah
