= American Players Theatre =

American theater troupe and complex in Spring Green, Wisconsin

- The American Players Theatre outdoor theatre stage in 2026
- Formation: 1977; 49 years ago
- Type: Theatre group
- Location: Spring Green, Wisconsin, U.S.
- Coordinates: 43°8′32″N 90°2′18″W
- Artistic director: Brenda DeVita
- Notable members: James DeVita; Randall Duk Kim (former); Amy Acker (former); Emma Bates (former); Carrie Coon (former)
- Website: americanplayers.org

American Players Theatre is an American classical theatrical troupe and theater complex located near Spring Green, Wisconsin. The theatre was founded by Randall Duk Kim, Anne Occhiogrosso, and Charles J. Bright in 1977 and held its first performance in 1980.

== History ==
American Players Theatre was founded in 1977 by Randall Duk Kim, Anne Occhiogrosso, and Charles J. Bright. The group moved to Spring Green, Wisconsin in 1979 and held its first performance in 1980. Its first performances were A Midsummer Night's Dream and Titus Andronicus.

The theatre struggled financially in its early years and nearly closed after being nominated for a Regional Theatre Tony Award in 1985. By 1986, the theatre had approximately $600,000 in debt and announced plans to close, but community fundraising and a loan from the state government allowed the theatre to pay off its debts.

In 2009, the group built the 200-seat Touchstone Theatre to complement its outdoor amphitheater.

In 2017, the complex finished a $7.7 million renovation project, replacing a wooden stage built in 1995 in the outdoor amphitheater and adding additional space for props and sets.

== Productions ==
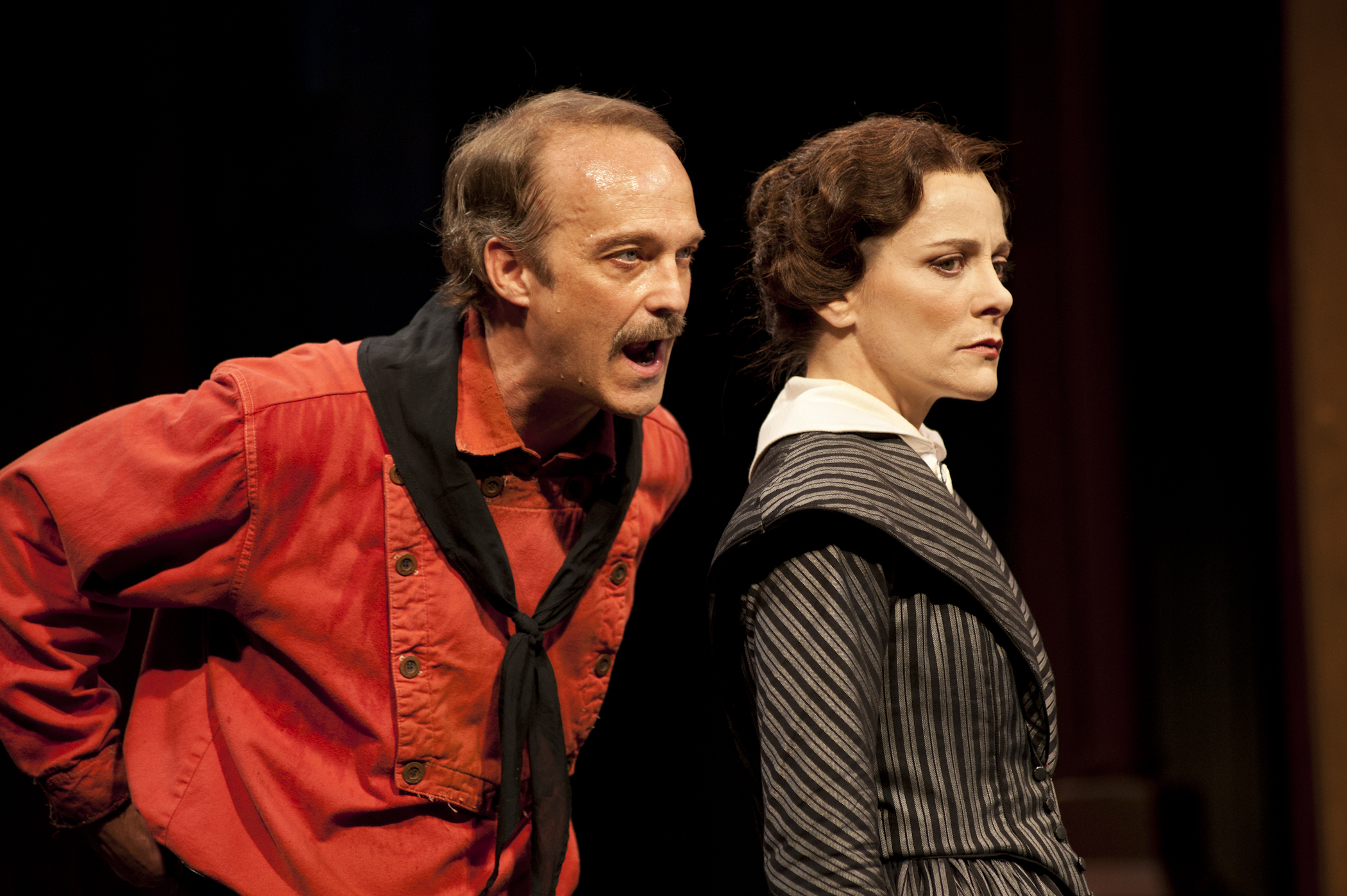
James Ridge and Tracy Michelle Arnold perform in The Taming of the Shrew in 2011.

Though initially founded as a purely Shakespearean company, the theatre began adding other playwrights to its repertoire in 1985, beginning with Anton Chekhov. Since then, the theatre has produced plays by George Bernard Shaw, Noël Coward, and Henrik Ibsen, among others. Performances are held at a 110-acre complex with two theaters, a 1,089-seat outdoor amphitheater and the 200-seat indoor Touchstone Theatre. The theatre produces nine plays each year, eight in the summer and one in winter. American Players Theatre provides voice coaches to each production because actors do not use microphones.

Artistic director Brenda DeVita said more than 110,000 people see the performances annually.

== Leadership ==
David Frank followed Randall Duk Kim as artistic leader. The theater has been led by artistic director Brenda DeVita since 2014.

== Awards and recognition ==
The theatre is known for the quality of its performances, with late Wall Street Journal drama critic, Terry Teachout, calling it "the finest classical theater festival" in the United States. In 2026, the APT won the Regional Theatre Tony Award.
