= Ben Fee =

American labor activist (1908–1978)

Ben Fee (张恨棠/木云) (September 3, 1908 – July 3, 1978) was an American writer and labor organizer who rose to prominence in the Chinatowns of San Francisco and New York in the mid-twentieth century. He was president of the Chinese Workers Mutual Aid Association and leader of the Chinese section of the United States Communist Party.

== Early years ==
Fee was born in Canton, China. Fee's mother was "known as a 'bomb thrower' . . . and [his] father . . . a 'draft-dodger'"; he grew up reading Marx and Lenin, and from his early years was aware of racism against California's Chinese population and felt that organized labor could be a solution.

In 1924, when the San Francisco restaurant Almond Blossom refused to serve Fee because he was Asian and other customers might object, he returned the next day with ten white friends who each ordered porterhouse steak, the most expensive item on the menu. Then Fee came in and was refused service on the same grounds given the day before. Fee then confronted the "customers" who, upon learning of the restaurant's policy, walked out of the restaurant, leaving the steaks cooking, unpaid for.

== Labor organizer ==
The son of a Chinese-American interpreter Fee moved to the United States at the age of 13. In 1934 he was employed by the International Ladies' Garment Workers' Union to organize Chinese garment workers in San Francisco. However his subsequent membership of and advocacy for the Communist Party alienated the Chinatown establishment and the union, which terminated his employment in 1938.

Following marital problems and a difficult divorce, Fee relocated to New York and resumed his advocacy for organized labor. In the 1940s he was active in the Chinese Students Association, the Alaska Cannery Workers Union and the Chinese Workers Mutual Aid Association.

== Departure from Communist Party ==
The time and circumstances of Fee's departure from the Communist Party are vague. All that is known is that he either left or was expelled some time between 1940 and 1950. In 1972, he wrote a retrospective evaluation on the pre-World War 2 Chinese Communist movement in the United States, which contained both praise and criticism.

== Literary work ==
Fee rapidly became a prominent part of the New York Chinatown of the 1940s, and a writer of short works depicting the Chinese American experience of the post-World War II era. His mix of old-style cultural mores was popularized by author and vaudeville producer Frank Chin who caricatured Fee as a mix of the American "Wild West" and traditional Chinese thinking. Chin described Fee as:

... a bareknuckled, unmasked man, a Chinaman loner out of the old West, a character out of Chinese sword-slingers, a fighter.

— Frank Chin, Confessions of a Chinatown Cowboy
