= The Chickencoop Chinaman =

1972 play by Frank Chin

- Original language: English
- Written by: Frank Chin
- Characters: Tam; Kenji; Lee; Charley Popcorn; Tom; Robbie; The Lone Ranger; Tonto; Hong Kong Dream Girl
- Subject: Asian American identity
- Genre: comedy
- Setting: Oakland area of Pittsburgh, late 1960s

Premiere
- Date: May 27, 1972
- Place: The American Place Theatre

The Chickencoop Chinaman is a 1972 play by Frank Chin. It was the first play written by an Asian American to have a major New York production.

== Story ==
Tam Lum, a Chinese American filmmaker working on a documentary about a black boxer named Ovaltine, has arrived in Pittsburgh to visit Ovaltine's father, Charley Popcorn. In Pittsburgh, he stays with his childhood friend, the Japanese American Kenji, who lives in Pittsburgh's black ghetto with his girlfriend Lee and her son. In Act I, Tam has just arrived and is catching up with Kenji. In Act II, the two men meet with Charley and bring him back to the apartment, where Lee's ex-husband has shown up to take her back. These scenes are intercut with fantasy sequences, such as one in which Tam meets his childhood hero, the Lone Ranger.

== Characters ==
- Tam Lum: a filmmaker who grew up in Chinatown but has adopted the inflections of black speech in honor of his hero, Ovaltine Jack Dancer, a black boxer about whom he is making a documentary
- Kenji: Tam's Japanese American childhood friend, who is hosting him during his stay in Pittsburgh
- Lee: Kenji's girlfriend, of uncertain ethnic extraction and with children by several different fathers; ex-wife of Tom
- Robbie: Lee's son
- Charley Popcorn: an elderly black man, presumably Ovaltine's father, but now running a porno theater
- Tom: a Chinese American author, now writing a book entitled Soul on Rice; Lee's ex-husband
- Hong Kong Dream Girl, The Lone Ranger and Tonto: characters who appear in fantasy/dream sequences

== First performance ==
The American Place Theatre, 27 May 1972. Directed by Jack Gelber; scenery by John Wulp; costumes by Willa Kim; lighting by Roger Morgan. With Randall Duk Kim, Sab Shimono, Sally Kirkland, Anthony Marciona, Leonard Jackson, Calvin Jung, and Joanna Pang in the lead roles.

== Reception ==
Although the play won the 1971 East West Players playwrighting contest, the reviews of the New York production were mixed. Positive reviews came from Edith Oliver at The New Yorker and Jack Kroll at Newsweek, but neither Clive Barnes nor Julius Novick of The New York Times enjoyed it. A middle-of-the-road review came from The Village Voice's Michael Feingold, who liked the characters, the situations, and much of the writing, but felt that the monologues were "hot air, disguised as Poetry". Audiences were critical too, as author Betty Lee Sung points out that many members left midway through.

== Themes ==
The play is a direct attack on the John Chinaman stereotype that continued to affect Chinese American men and an attempt to investigate what Chin perceives to be the cultural emasculation of Asian American by racist stereotypes. The main character of the play, Tam Lum, is a Chinese American filmmaker who, as a boy in search of heroic Chinese American models listened to the Lone Ranger radio shows and believed that the Ranger wears a mask because he is in fact a Chinese man intent on bringing "Chinaman vengeance on the West". Seeing the men of his parents' generation as unheroic—he used to care for an elderly dishwasher who wore his underwear in the bath out of fear of being watched by old white women—Tam uses Ovaltine as his model for masculinity; but he finds out later that Ovaltine had made up his stories about Charley being his father, and he also learns that the old man he cared for (whom everyone else assumes is his father) was in fact extremely dignified and loved to watch boxing matches. As scholar Jinqi Ling notes, Tam's inability to see [the dishwasher's] dignity represents not only the historical and cultural effects of racism on Asian American men, but also the role of language and story in capturing and passing on a new, heroic Asian American masculinity. As scholar Elaine H. Kim notes, Tam is only good for his ability to out-talk people, and even though he has given up his self-delusions and let go of the idea that he could be like the black men he admires, he will remain so until he is able to connect his masculinity to his heritage; in the meantime, he is, as Kim says, "still experimenting".

The character of Tam is in many ways the continuation of such earlier Chin characters as Johnny from "Food for All His Dead", Freddy (later renamed Dirigible) from "Yes, Young Daddy" and Dirigible from "Goong Hai Fot Choy". As in those stories (some of which are available in revised versions in The Chinaman Pacific & Frisco R.R. Co.), he looks outside of Chinatown—and outside Asian America—for models. But everywhere he looks, the models of fatherhood are absent or ambiguous: he rarely mentions his own children; his best friend Kenji seems to be refusing to acknowledge having a child of his own; Ovaltine has fabricated stories about his father (who was in fact only his manager). The only male character in the play who seems eager to embrace fatherhood is Tom, a Chinese American who has bought into the model minority myth of Asian American while, at the same time, arguing that Tam needs to accept that they are Chinese rather than Americans. Chin has described Tam as the "comic embodiment of Asian-American manhood", a character designed to capture the experience of Asian American men—not just their circumstances, but their language, their symbols, their humor and their mythology. Yet critics such as Kim feel that Chin has not quite achieved his own goal, and that perhaps Chin has too readily accepted an oppressive definition of masculinity.

Chin's use of the Lone Ranger signifies his interest in the history and legends of the Old West, especially the contributions and sufferings of the Chinese immigrants who helped build the railroads and who became the first Chinese Americans; Chin considers their stories to be as important to Chinese American history as those of the Chinese classic about oppressed rebels who challenge the Emperor's authority, Outlaws of the Marsh. At the same time, his use of language represents his admiration for the Black Power movement and their fight against institutionalized racism and white dominance; his characters speak an English that is inflected with both Cantonese and black vernacular elements. David Leiwei Li points out that this language reflects Tam's rebellion against the Orientalist American construction of Asian American and wants "to claim a Chinese American language that is self-referential and that will relate to others", and that he begins to realize by the end of the play that he needs to turn to the history and stories about Chinese America, such as those stories of the Old West he had heard from his grandmother; in this way, Chinese American men will no longer be passively created by American Orientalism, but will gain the ability to create themselves. In her introduction to the printed edition of the play, Dorothy Ritsuko McDonald connects Tam's use of language with Chin's desire to capture "the rhythms and accents of Chinese America," in accordance with Tam's wish to be taken seriously as neither Chinese or assimilated American, but as a synthesis of the two: an American whose ancestors were not allowed into the mainstream of American history.

== See also ==
- Asian American literature
- Chinese American literature
