= The Year of the Dragon (play) =

Play written by Frank Chin

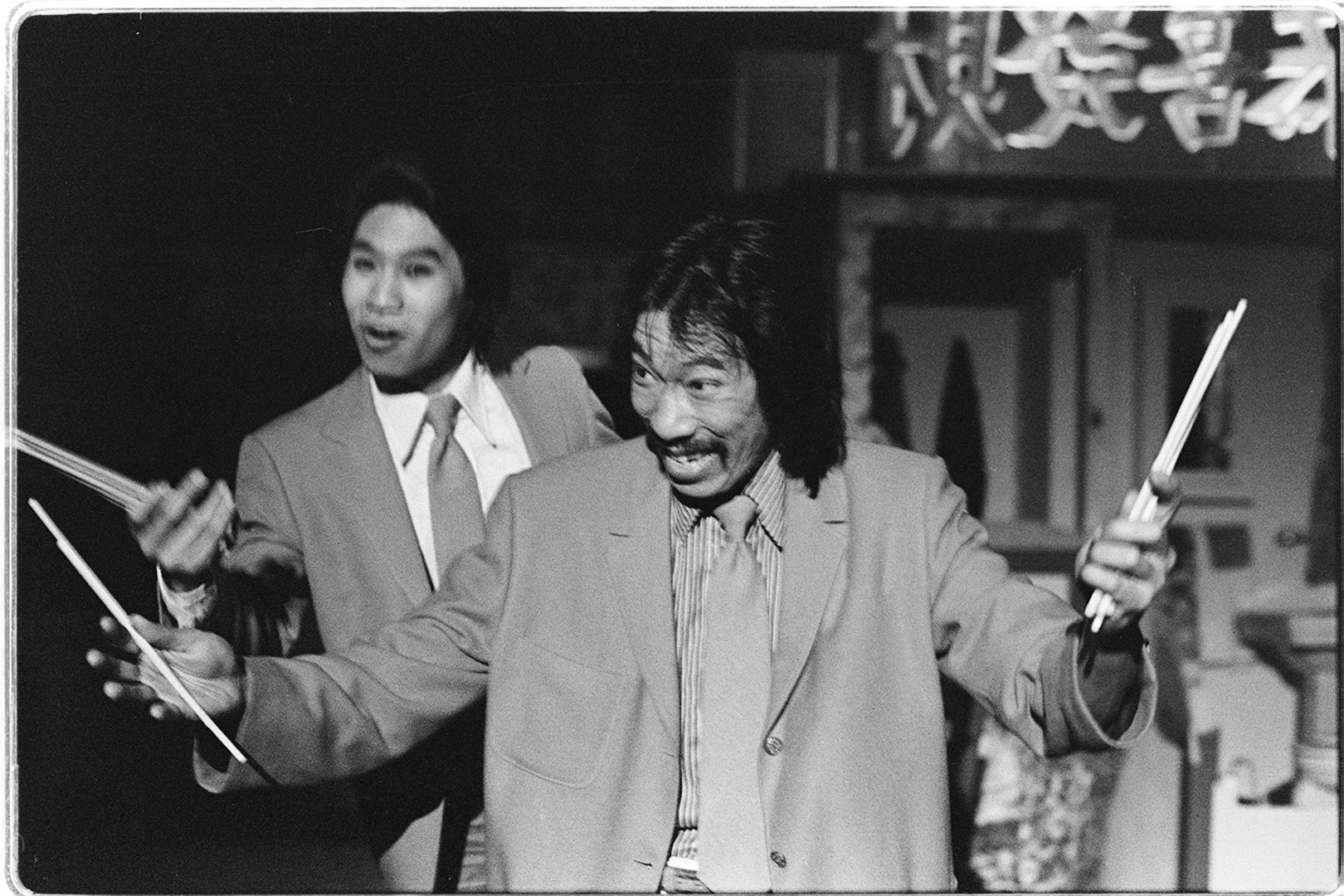
- Frank Chin playing the character of Fred Eng in a 1978 production of The Year of the Dragon.
- Original language: English
- Written by: Frank Chin
- Characters: The Eng family
- Subject: Asian American identity
- Genre: Realism
- Setting: Chinatown

Premiere
- Date: May 22, 1974
- Place: USA

The Year of the Dragon is a play written by Chinese American playwright Frank Chin. It is one of the first plays by an Asian American playwright to be produced on a mainstream New York stage. It premiered in 1974 at the American Place Theatre, and starred Randall Duk Kim, who had played the lead in Chin's earlier play, The Chickencoop Chinaman. The rest of the cast included Pat Suzuki, Tina Chen, Conrad Yama, Lilah Kan, Doug Higgins, and Keenan Shimizu.

The play portrays a Chinese American family in Chinatown, San Francisco during Chinese New Year. Chin wrote the play as a critique of the racism in American society, and the play satirizes "American tourists who eroticize, objectify, and commodify Chinatown and its residents."

A television production of the play was filmed by PBS for Great Performances in 1975 with George Takei replacing Kim as Fred, after Kim declined the television adaptation for artistic reasons, feeling that there would not be an adequate amount of rehearsal time for the adaptation to work. The rest of the original cast appeared in the PBS production.

In addition to subsequent productions, the play was revived in 2001 by East West Players in 2001, under the direction of Japanese American actor Mako Iwamatsu, who had directed the first EWP production in 1974.

== Story ==
The play tells the story of Fred Eng, a 40-something tour guide who lives at home in San Francisco's Chinatown with his parents and younger brother, Johnny. Fred is frustrated because ten years earlier he had given up his dreams of being a writer to help his cancer-stricken father run the tour guide business. Yet, not only is his father still alive, he also has no respect for Fred's desire to be a writer and mocks Fred for dropping out of college, even though Fred did so to help him. Fred also hates working as a tour guide, as he must act out the white tourists' fantasy of what Chinese people are like, unable to make them understand that Chinatown is not China and that its residents are Americans too. Fred is also frustrated that his brother Johnny, in addition to running with a bad crowd, is not interested in leaving Chinatown for a better life, but wants to become part of the family business.

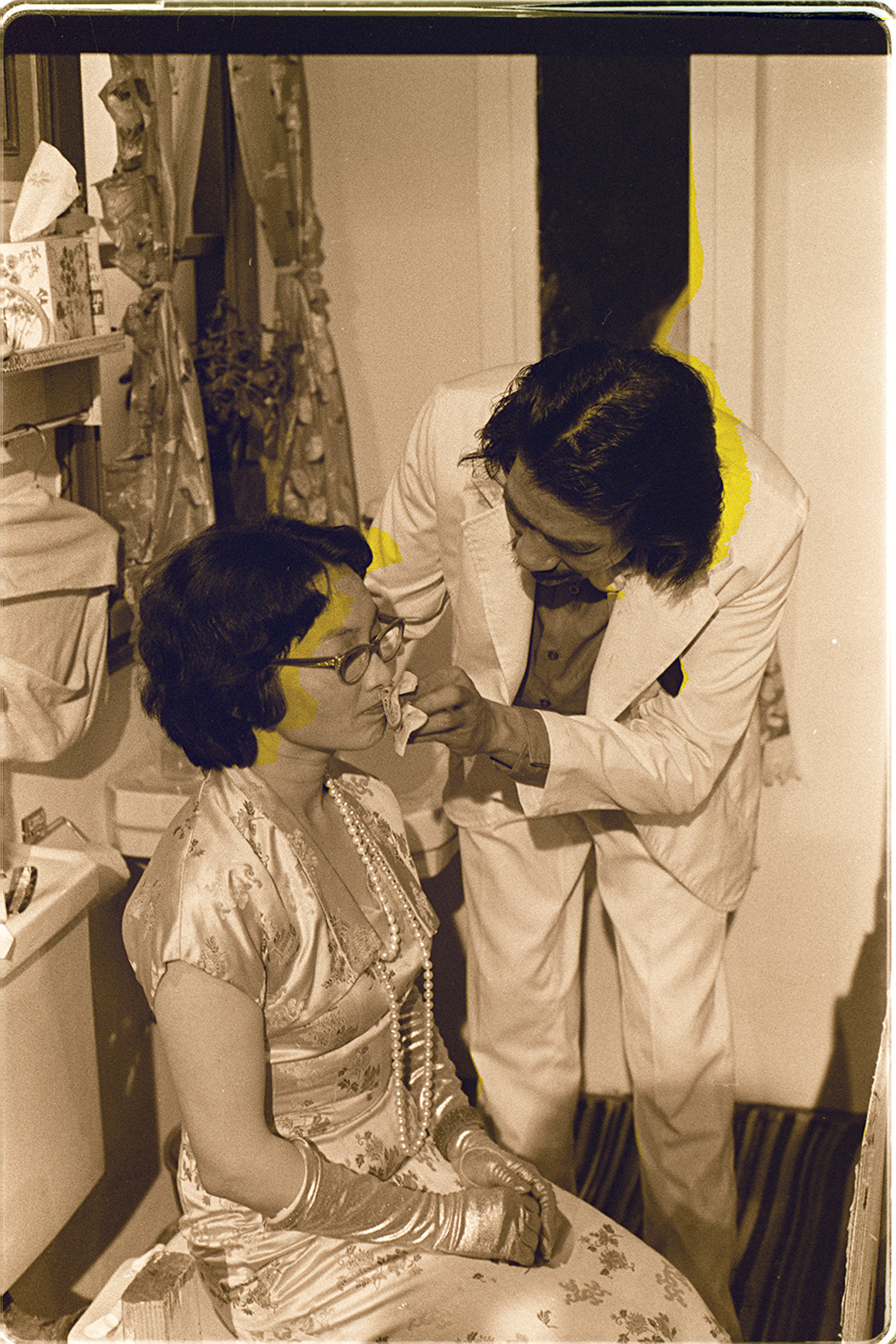
Playwright Frank Chin as "Fred Eng" comforts his mother Hyacinth in a scene from the AATW production in San Francisco 1978

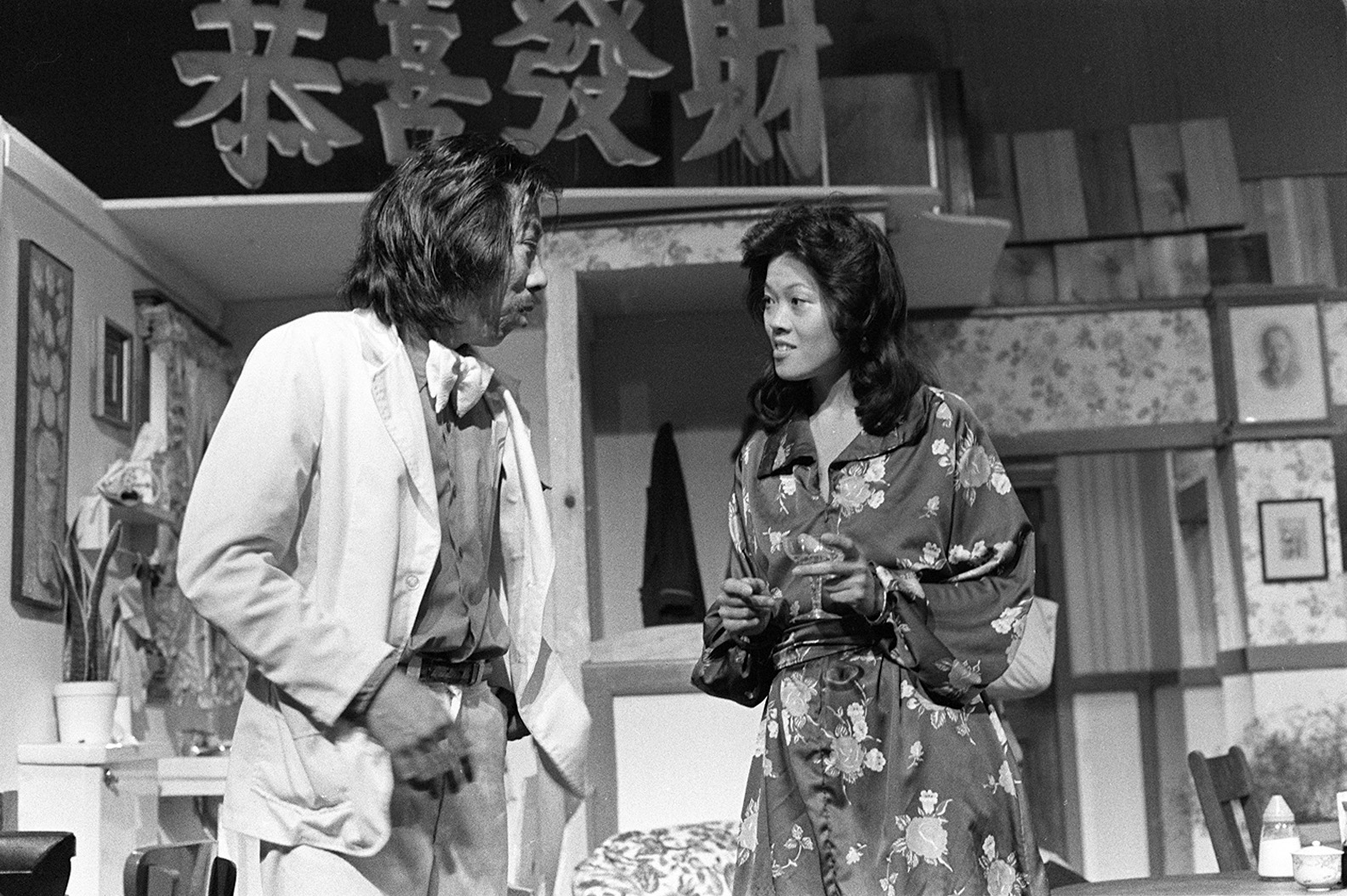
Kathleen Chang plays Sissy to Frank Chin's Fred Eng.

The conflict of the play centers around a Chinese New Year celebration when Fred's sister, Sissy, comes to visit with her sinophile white husband, Ross. Sissy has been on tour promoting a Chinese cookbook that she and Fred have written; the indignity of being reduced to writing food porn as his only marketable outlet for writing further upsets Fred. On the same day that Sissy and Ross arrive, Pa's first wife (and Fred's biological mother) arrives from China, thanks to the new immigration laws that allowed Chinese women to immigrate to the US to join their husbands. The arrival of "China Mama" creates conflict between Pa and his current wife, Hyacinth, who feels betrayed by his decision to bring his first wife over after he had promised not to and by the fact that she herself had risked losing her citizenship by marrying Pa. It also becomes clear that Pa wants to split the family in two as he nears the end of his life, favoring his "Chinese" family over his "American" one.

== Setting and themes ==
Chin's play is set partly in a realistic apartment setting and partly in a theatrical setting in which Fred speaks to the audience as though they are his tour group. By dividing the play in this way, Chin forces the audience (who at the time were mostly white) to consider their own versions of Chinese Americans and of Chinatown life against a more realistic depiction in which sons and wives are not passively obedient to their fathers, American-born Chinese do not desire to move to China, and white interest in Chinese culture is not always a positive thing. Chin also touches on the artistic problems for Chinese Americans, noting that Fred's only options as a writer are autobiography and cookbooks, and that Pa has internalized the Chinese stereotypes he has seen in the movies, so far as to imitate Charlie Chan and refer to Fred as "number one son." Through these thematic and dramaturgic devices, Chin confronts the audience with the myth of the "model minority" and presents a more disturbing picture of Chinese American life, one that is probably no different from the average American life, but that does not accord with American stereotypes.

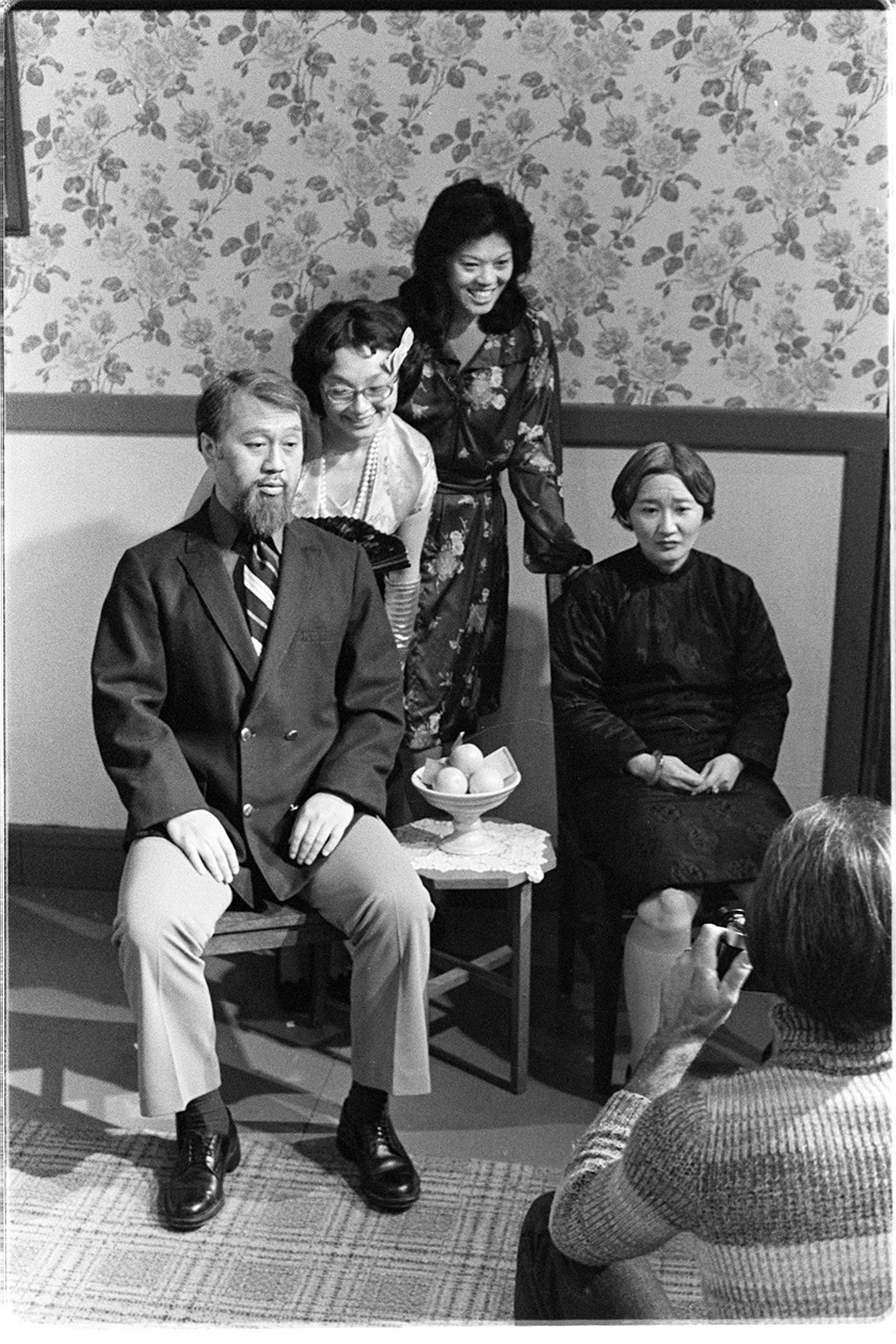
An AATW production in San Francisco 1978

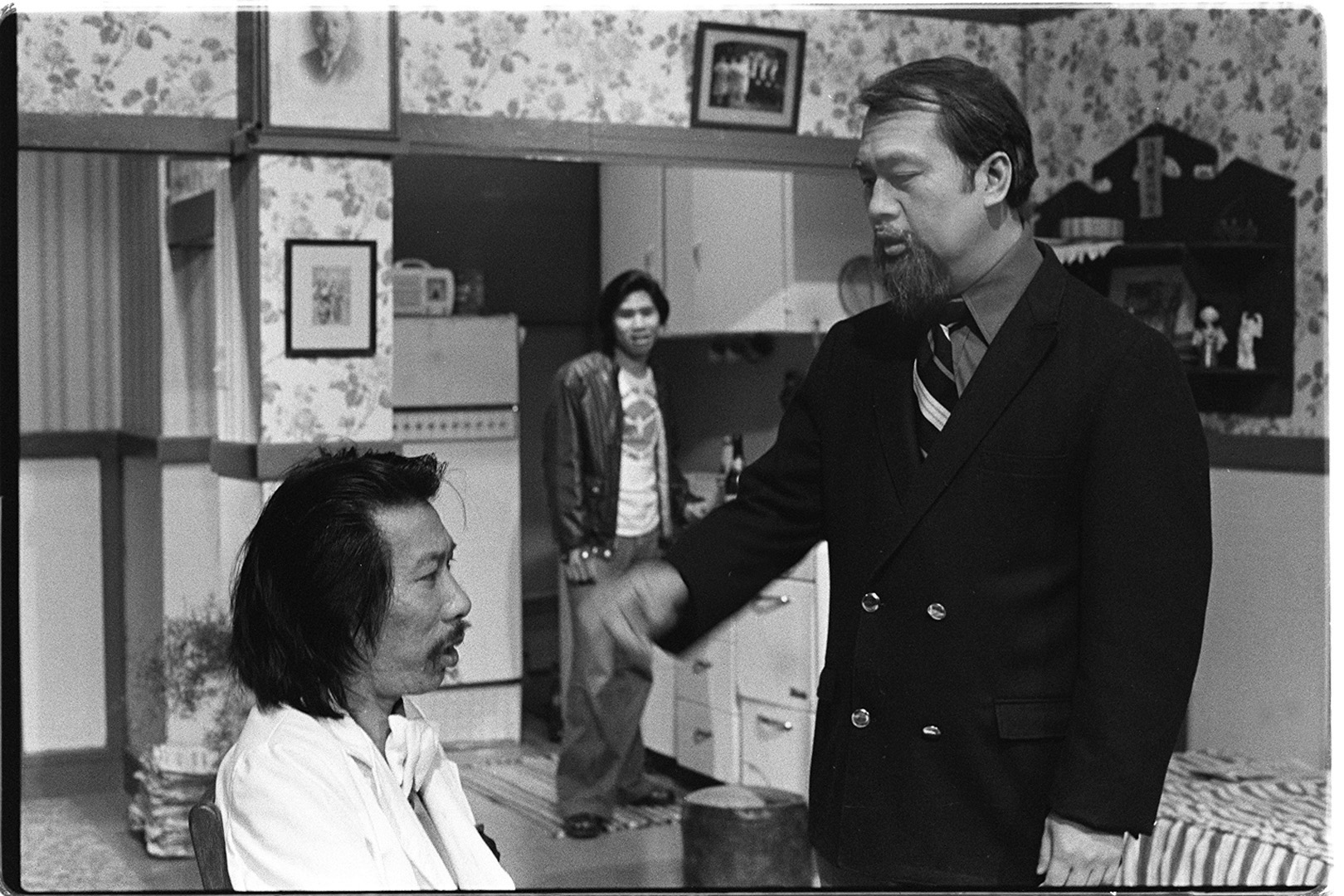
Frank Chin and George Woo play father and son in The Year of the Dragon, 1978

== Publication history ==
The play has been published together with his earlier play, The Chickencoop Chinaman.

== Critical studies ==
(as of March 2008):

1. The Year of the Dragon by Frank Chin By: Chua, Cheng Lok. IN: Wong and Sumida, A Resource Guide to Asian American Literature. New York, NY: Modern Language Association of America; 2001. pp. 175–84
2. 'Beware of Tourists If You Look Chinese' and Other Survival Tactics in the American Theatre: The Asian(cy) of Display in Frank Chin's The Year of the Dragon By: Ku, Robert Ji-Song; Journal of American Drama and Theatre, 1999 Spring; 11 (2): 78-92.
3. An Introduction to Frank Chin's The Chickencoup Chinaman and The Year of the Dragon By: McDonald, Dorothy Ritsuko. IN: Baker, Three American Literatures: Essays in Chicano, Native American, and Asian-American Literature for Teachers of American Literature. New York: Modern Language Assn. of America; 1982. pp. 229–253
