= The Chinaman Pacific and Frisco R.R. Co. =

The Chinaman Pacific & Frisco R.R. Co.
- Author: Frank Chin
- Language: English
- Genre: short-story collection, Asian American
- Publisher: Coffee House Press
- Publication date: 1988
- Publication place: United States
- Pages: 165
- ISBN: 978-0-918273-44-4

The Chinaman Pacific and Frisco R.R. Co. is a 1988 short-story collection by Frank Chin that collects many of the short stories he had published in the 1970s. It won the American Book Award. The collection deals with Chinese-American history by recalling the work of early Chinese immigrants in such jobs as "coolie, railworker and launderer".

== Stories ==
- "Railroad Standard Time"
- "The Eat and Run Midnight People"
- "The Chinatown Kid"
- "The Only Real Day"
- "Yes, Young Daddy"
- "Give the Enemy Sweet Sissies and Women to Infatuate Him, and Jades and Silks to Blind Him with Greed"
- "A Chinese Lady Dies" (originally published as "Goong Hai Fot Choy")
- "The Sons of Chan"
- "Afterword" (a parodical attack on Maxine Hong Kingston's best-selling book The Woman Warrior)

== Themes ==
Many of the characters in these stories are, in Sau-ling Cynthia Wong's words, "elderly paralytics [who] appear to exist in a static twilight zone of living death"; she mentions the parents in "A Chinese Lady Dies", "Railroad Standard Time", and (from an early story not included in the collection) "Food for All His Dead". Wong notes that in Chin's fiction, immobility represents an unchanging and crippling Chinatown culture that must be escaped by the younger generation. As scholar Elaine H. Kim points out, Chin's metaphors for the community include "bugs, spiders, frogs, [...] a funeral parlor, and obsolete carnival, or a pathetic minstrel show." A related issue is the generational conflict between the Chinese immigrant parents and the American-born children—recall that the "elderly paralytics" were all parents. In "A Chinese Lady Dies", for instance, both the mother and the community are dying; the mother not only described as a cadaver but also actively attending all the local funerals. In "Yes, Young Daddy", Dirigible (whose nickname was, symbolically, "Dirge") has left Chinatown for college, but is drawn back into his Chinatown habits through a letter-correspondence with his younger cousin, Lena, whose father has died and who refers to Dirigible as her "young daddy" after he corrects her grammar and gives her dating advice. After a trip back to Chinatown to visit Lena, Dirigible realizes he can no longer worry about the people still in Chinatown; he must focus on himself. The narrators in these stories see through the façades of Chinatown life but are unable to do anything to help.

As in much of Chin's work, this problem is focused on the problem of masculinity, of young men feeling that the Anglo vision of Asians is always feminine and that there are no good male role models in the Chinatown communities. The male narrators of "A Chinese Lady Dies" and "Yes, Young Daddy" are surrounded mostly by women, with the fathers gone and the only other men around being the local storekeepers.

One of the ways Chin's characters escape the dead-end of Chinatown is by valorizing their ancestor's heroism in the face of oppression and poverty. The title of "The Eat and Run Midnight People" refers to the narrator's peasant ancestors in Canton Province, China: "...the get out of town eat and run folks, hungry all the time eating after looking for food". And the narrator of "Railroad Standard Time" knowingly romanticizes the life of a grandfather he never really knew.

Another way his characters escape the static nature of Chinatown culture is through motion. Many of Chin's characters are, in Wong's words, "addicted to mobility: [...] the exhilarating rush it provides, a solipsistic sensation of power and domination"; his characters are not interested in finding a better place to live, but rather in being altogether free from social constraints. Chin relishes the freedom celebrated in legends of the Old West, represented by the railroads that he references in the title of the collection, which were built with the help of Chinese immigrants who would never themselves be able to ride them. For Chin, the history of these immigrants in the Old West is as important for Chinese American history as the story of the oppressed rebels who challenge the Emperor's authority in the Chinese classic novel Outlaws of the Marsh, which he references in "A Chinese Lady Dies"; Chin's love of the Old West includes a strong-sense of retribution for Anglo racism, of "Chinaman vengeance on the West". The narrator of "The Eat and Run Midnight People", a former railroad brakeman, loved not only the freedom of movement provided by the railroad, but also the way his job allowed him to become part of the American project of conquering the West (e.g., Manifest Destiny), the kind of job that is sung about in folk songs like "I've Been Working on the Railroad".

But as Wong notes, the railroad is an ambivalent symbol for Chinese Americans, since it represents both the American dream of mobility, luxury and power but also the historical difficulties of the Chinese workers, who often had no choice but to take railroad jobs and who were never allowed the sort of mobility the railroad offered to Anglos. The narrator of "The Eat and Run Midnight People" also recognizes that the heroic songs about railroad workers are fundamentally silly and feels trapped by the restricted range of motion found on railroads: although they allow a great range of mobility, they do not allow much freedom of direction—their path is predetermined. The narrator longs for the free motion of birds' flight but also finds himself pondering death by falling as a way to escape the life of constant riding.

Scholar Rachel Lee has examined one story in which Chin examines the young/old conflict from the perspective of the older generation: "The Only Real Day," which focuses on Yuen, an immigrant who has fallen out of contact with this family back in Hong Kong and now works as a dishwasher in Oakland for a woman he finds too assimilated to American culture; his only contact with his friends comes once a week when he meets them in San Francisco for gambling night. His life is overly routine until he receives a letter from immigration that he cannot read; he must depend on Rose and her American-born son, Dirigible, to guide through an immigration system that he does not trust—he knows from experience that the authorities don't always play fair with Chinese residents and feels that he has no rights in this country. Yuen despairs about the state of the world, lamenting that there is little chance of new heroes arising in the same manner of those recounted in the classic Chinese novel Outlaws of the Marsh. Yuen attempts suicide, but ends up dying in the bath; Lee considers that Chin has deliberately created "a prolonged, Hamlet-like contemplation of one's lack of action" that also reveals the legacy of U.S. legal discrimination against Asians.

== See also ==
- Asian American literature
- Chinese American literature
