= Chinese American literature =

Chinese American literature is the body of literature produced in the United States by writers of Chinese descent. The genre began in the 19th century and flowered in the 20th with such authors as Sui Sin Far, Frank Chin, Maxine Hong Kingston, and Amy Tan.

== Characteristics and themes ==
Chinese American literature deals with many topics and themes. A common topic is the challenges, both inner and outer, of assimilation in mainstream, white American society by Chinese Americans. Another common theme is that of interaction between generations, particularly older, Chinese-born and younger, American-born generations. Questions of identity and gender are often dealt with as well.

== History ==
=== 19th-century Chinese American literature ===
19th-century Chinese American literature has only recently come to be studied, as much of it was written in Chinese. These Chinese-language writings of Chinese Americans immigrants have only recently been made available.

19th-century Chinese American writers were primarily workers and students. These early Chinese American authors produced autobiographies as well as novels and poems, mostly in Cantonese. Many wrote in both English and Chinese, sometimes exploring similar themes in each language, sometimes translating their own works from language into the other. Tone as well as content differed, as Chinese American writers in English dealt with rampant stereotypes of the Yellow Peril.

Among these early writers was Yung Wing, the first Chinese student to graduate from an American University (Yale, in 1854), whose autobiography, My Life in China and America, was published in 1909.

=== 20th-century Chinese American literature ===
Chinese American literature written of the 20th century is written almost exclusively in English. Edith Maude Eaton, writing as Sui Sin Far, was one of the first Chinese American authors to publish fiction in English, although her works, first published in the teens, were not re-discovered and re-printed until 1995. In the 1930s, Lin Yutang's My Country and My People (1935), and The Importance of Living (1937), became best-sellers.

Chinese American authors became more prolific and accepted after the lifting of the Chinese Exclusion Act. Authors who achieved success in the 1950s included C.Y. Lee (author), whose The Flower Drum Song was made into a Rodgers and Hammerstein musical, and Jade Snow Wong, author of Fifth Chinese Daughter.

The 1970s saw further progress. Playwright Frank Chin's play, The Chickencoop Chinaman (1971) became the first play by an Asian American to be produced as a major New York production. Maxine Hong Kingston won the National Book Critics Circle Award in 1976 for The Woman Warrior: Memoirs of a Girlhood among Ghosts.

In the 1980s, David Henry Hwang won the Obie award for his play, FOB, as well as a Tony Award for Best Play for his M. Butterfly. Bette Bao Lord's Spring Moon (1981) became an international bestseller and an American Book Award nominee. Amy Tan's The Joy Luck Club was published to immediate popularity and wide, though not universal, acclaim. The book stayed on the New York Times bestseller list for over forty weeks, and won the National Book Award, the Los Angeles Times Book Prize, and the Commonwealth Gold Award. The Joy Luck Club was produced as a major motion picture in 1993 and was nominated for Best Picture.

The 1990s saw further growth, as David Wong Louie received acclaim for his short story collection, Pangs of Love, and Eric Liu collected memoirs and essays in The Accidental Asian: Notes of a Native Speaker (1997).

=== Recent history ===
Currently active and acclaimed Chinese American authors are Gish Jen, Jean Kwok, Shirley Geok-lin Lim, and Sandra Tsing Loh. Shawn Wong's novel American Knees, published in 1996, was adapted into an independent feature film entitled Americanese in 2009.

In 2025 Chinese American poet Arthur Sze became the first Asian American United States Poet Laureate.

=== Chinese American criticism ===
Frank Chin and others have been vocal critics of popular Chinese American authors, particularly Chinese American women authors, such as Maxine Hong Kingston and Amy Tan. Chin argues that Tan and others paint a world in which Chinese Americans must repudiate "the icky-gooey evil of Chinese culture". Others have criticized Chinese American women authors for criticizing sexism in Chinese culture; in so doing, critics argue, these women are participating in the "racial castration" of Chinese and Asian American men, who are already "materially and psychically feminized" by mainstream, white American culture.

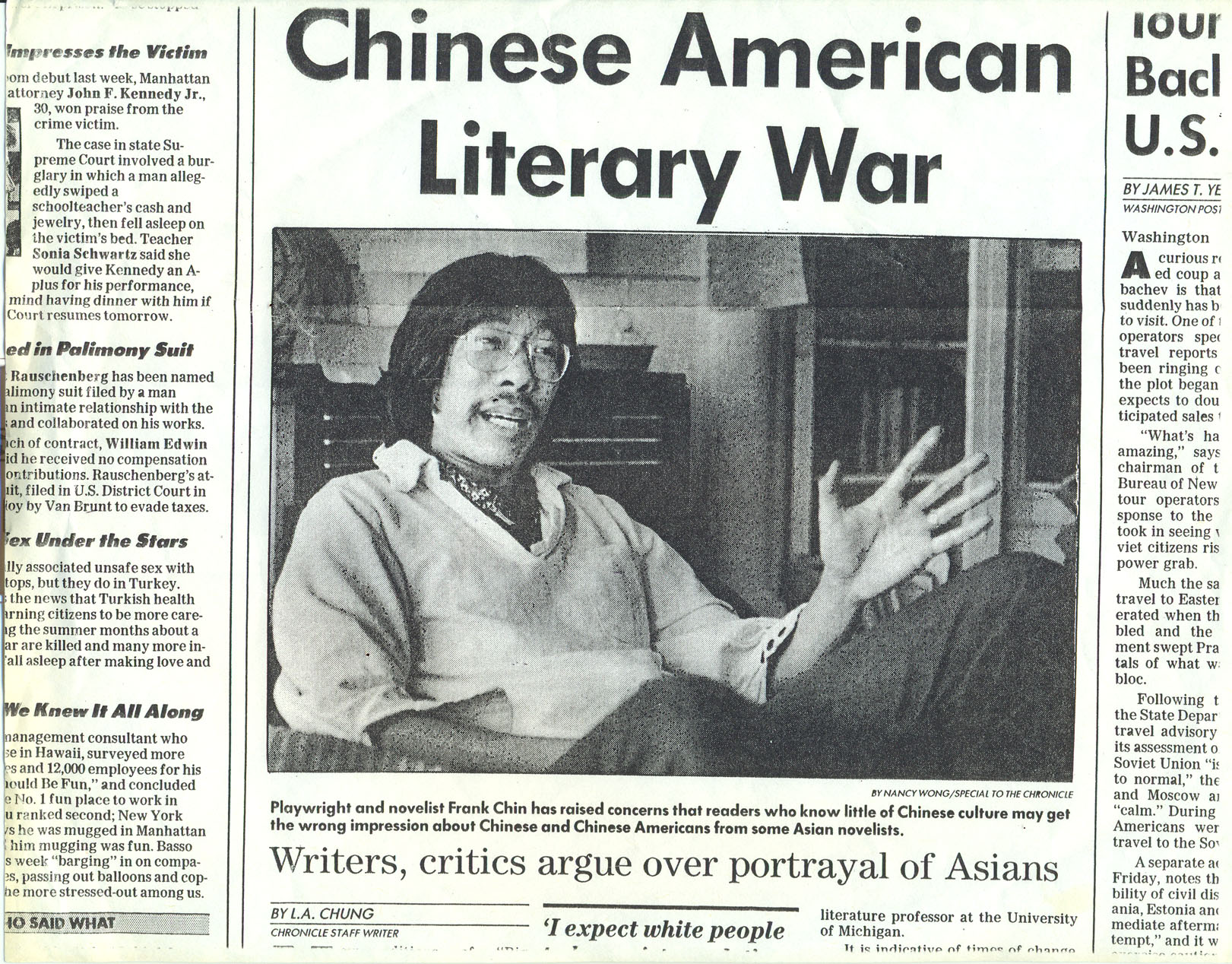
Playwright Frank Chin in a San Francisco Chronicle Datebook section article dated mid 1990s

Some of these criticisms are fueled by anger over the way in which female Chinese American authors have portrayed the sexism and patriarchy of Imperial China, ways which male critics feel are sometimes unfair. For example, Maxine Hong Kingston has been criticized for her claim in The Woman Warrior that, in Chinese, the character for "woman" is also the character for "slave." Critics of Kingston claim that while 奴 (slave) contains 女 (woman), it is only as a radical to indicate the pronunciation of the character.

== See also ==
- Chinese American
- List of Asian American writers
- Asian American literature
- American literature
- Asian American Literary Awards
- Asian/Pacific American Awards for Literature
