= Betty Lee Sung =

American author and academic (1924–2023)

- Born: Betty Lee; October 3, 1924; Baltimore, Maryland, U.S.
- Died: January 19, 2023 (aged 98); Silver Spring, Maryland, U.S.
- Education: University of Illinois Urbana-Champaign (1948); Queens College (1968); CUNY Graduate Center (1982)
- Occupations: Activist, Author, Professor of Asian-American Studies
- Spouses: Hsi Yuan Sung (m. 1948; div. 1966) Charles Chung (m. 1972; died 2015)
- Children: 4

Betty Lee Sung
- Chinese: 宋李瑞芳
Transcriptions
Standard Mandarin
- Hanyu Pinyin: Sòng Lǐ Ruìfāng

Betty Lee Sung (October 3, 1924 – January 19, 2023) was an American activist, author, and professor at City College of New York. As a scholar of Asian American studies, her several publications on Asian American race issues have been recognized as an influential force in advancing the rights of Asian Americans and immigrants in the United States. Sung was awarded an honorary doctorate from the State University of New York at Old Westbury in 1996.

== Biography ==
Born in Baltimore, Maryland, on October 3, 1924, Sung's interest in the history of Chinese Americans was shaped by her own experience as a child of Chinese immigrant parents. When Sung was nine, her father briefly took the family back to his hometown, Taishan, but the family returned to Washington D.C. before Guangdong was captured by the Japanese during World War II. While growing up in Washington D.C., Sung and her family faced discrimination as Chinese immigrants. The treatment towards Chinese people in the United States was so severe that Sung recalled how her family largely avoided public areas like the movies or swimming pools.

Defying her father's wish that she marry instead of furthering her education, she attended the University of Illinois Urbana-Champaign on a full scholarship and graduated Phi Beta Kappa with a double major in economics and sociology in 1948. Much later, she received a Master of Library Science degree from Queens College, City University of New York (1968) and a Ph.D. from the Graduate School and University Center of the City University of New York (1982).

On February 22, 1948, she married Hsi-Yuan Sung; they divorced in 1966. She had four children from her first marriage. Her second marriage to Charles Chia Mou Chung took place on July 23, 1972. In 1983, she and Charles moved to Charles' cooperative apartment in Manhattan's Chinatown, and she became even more active in the Chinatown community, leading rallies, meeting political leaders and supporting Chinese American candidates for political office. In 2014, Charles' eldest daughter, having acquired power of attorney for her father and at his request, filed a Petition for Dissolution of his 42-year marriage to Betty.

Sung moved to New York after graduating from University of Illinois Urbana-Champaign and worked as a script writer for the Voice of America, where one of her programs "Chinese Activities" was focused on Chinese living in the United States. While doing research for her stories, Sung was struck by how most material, even in the Library of Congress, held inaccurate and often stereotypical assumptions about Chinese people and culture. This inspired Sung to write her first book, Mountain of Gold: The Story of the Chinese in America.

After publishing Mountain of Gold, Sung was invited to join the Asian American Studies program at The City College of New York in 1970, where she advanced to the Chair of the Department of Asian Studies. She held this position until her retirement in 1992. She published 7 other scholarly works on the socio-economic profile of the Chinese in America, Chinese immigrant children, and intermarriage. In 2015, she wrote her memoirs Defiant Second Daughter: My First 90 Years.

In 1994, Sung completed a database of the Chinese immigrant records in the New York Region National Archives with grants from the Chiang Ching Kuo Foundation and the National Endowment for the Humanities. The database was featured by the New York Times, and enables scholars to conduct genealogical research and recreate the early history of Chinese immigrants in New York. The records document the arrival of Chinese immigrants to New York City as early as 1860, filling in a missing piece of Chinese American history following the Chinese Exclusion Act of 1882.

In 2001, Sung and Thomas Tam co-founded the Asian American / Asian Research Institute (AAARI) at the City University of New York, a university-wide scholarly research and resource center on policies and issues that affect Asians and Asian Americans. In 2017, she received the Lifetime Achievement Award from the Association for Asian American Studies (AAAS).

Sung possessed a large collection of material related to Asian Americans. She donated a large portion to the Library of Congress Asia Division in 2007 and the remainder to the Museum of Chinese in America in 2019 and upon her death. Dr. Hwa-Wei Lee, former Chief of the Asian Division, wrote "Betty was very kind to donate her lifetime collection for the benefit of future generations."

Sung was also a member of the Committee of 100, an organization committed to addressing Chinese American issues. In her lifetime, Sung also has been honored by the Organization of Chinese Americans, the American Library Association, the Asian American Higher Education Council, and New York Historical Society. Additional information about Sung's life may be found at the Museum of Chinese in America, AARI, and the Committee of 100.

Sung died in Silver Spring, Maryland, on January 19, 2023, at the age of 98. She was predeceased by her husband (October 7, 2015) and survived by the four children from her first marriage.

== Education ==
Sung graduated Phi Beta Kappa with a B.A. in Economics and Sociology from the University of Illinois Urbana-Champaign in 1948. In 1968, she earned a Masters of Library Science from Queens College, City University of New York. In 1982, she earned a PhD from the Graduate School and University Center of the City University of New York.

== Publications ==
- Mountain of Gold: The Story of the Chinese in America (1967)
- Chinese American Manpower and Employment (1976)
- The Chinese in America (1973)
- Album of Chinese Americans (1977)
- Statistical Profiles of the Chinese in the United States (1979)
- Adjustment Experience of Chinese Immigrant Children in New York City (1987)
- Chinese American Intermarriage (1990)
- Defiant Second Daughter: My First 90 Years (2015)

== See also ==
- Chinese Americans in New York City
