= Frank Chin =

American author and playwright

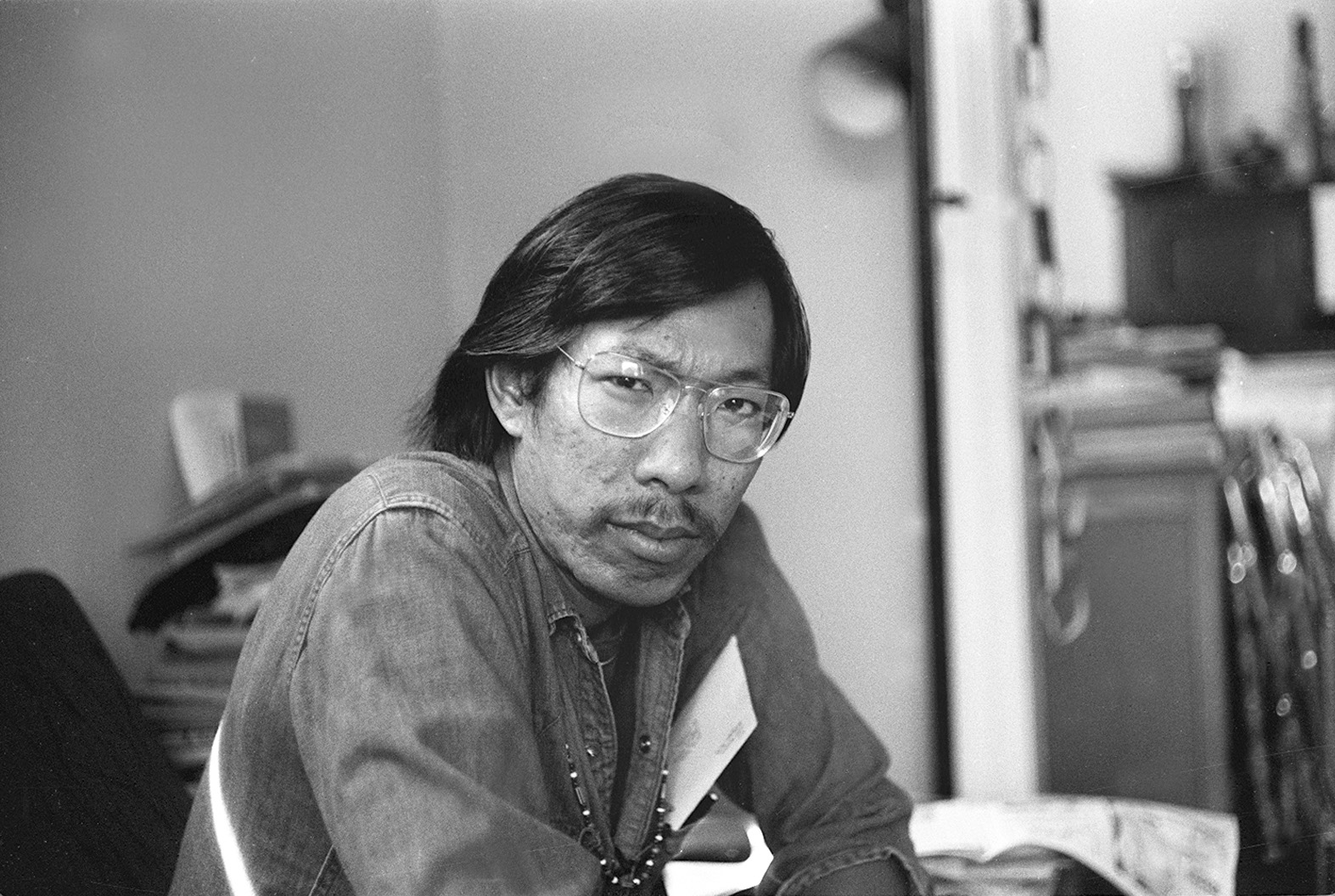
- Chin in 1975
- Born: February 25, 1940 (age 86); Berkeley, California, U.S.
- Education: University of California, Berkeley; University of California, Santa Barbara (BA)
- Occupations: Playwright; novelist; writer
- Spouse: Kathy Change (divorced)
- Writing career
- Notable works: The Year of the Dragon (1974); Aiiieeeee! (1974); Donald Duk (1991)
- Notable awards: American Book Award (1982, 1989, 2000) 1992 Lannan Literary Award for Fiction

Frank Chin (born February 25, 1940) is an American author and playwright. He is considered to be one of the pioneers of Asian-American theatre.

== Life and career ==
Frank Chin was born in Berkeley, California on February 25, 1940. His grandfather worked on the Western Pacific Railroad. He remained under the care of a retired vaudeville couple in Placerville, California until he was 6. At that time, his mother brought him back to the San Francisco Bay Area and thereafter Chin grew up in Oakland Chinatown. He attended the University of California, Berkeley, where he contributed to the California Pelican. He graduated from the University of California, Santa Barbara in 1965. According to Chin, who had returned from a sabbatical working as the first Chinese brakeman for the Southern Pacific railroad, he intimidated a dean into graduating him with a bachelor's degree in English: "[I said] 'I want a decision by Friday' and he said, 'Well, I'm a very busy man,' and I said, 'You're a working stiff like me - you have a decision Friday and I don't care what it is. Either I've graduated or I haven't graduated because I have to get back to work.' Friday, I walked by the office and the secretary jumps up and says: 'You've graduated!' I said, 'That's all I want to know'."

Early in his career, Chin worked as a story editor and scriptwriter on Sesame Street and as a reporter for KING-TV in Seattle.

Chin is considered to be one of the pioneers of Asian-American theatre. He co-founded the Asian American Theater Company with Filipino-American playwright Melvyn Escueta in 1973. His play The Chickencoop Chinaman was the first by an Asian-American to be produced on a major New York stage. As an author, Chin has won three American Book Awards: the first in 1982 for his plays The Chickencoop Chinaman and The Year of the Dragon, the second in 1989 for a collection of short stories entitled The Chinaman Pacific and Frisco R.R. Co., and the third in 2000 for lifetime achievement. His full-length novel, Confessions of a Number One Son: The Great Chinese American Novel, was written in the early 1970s, but was not published until nearly four decades later (2015) by Calvin McMcmillin, a literary scholar specializing in Asian American literature. The work is a sequel to The Chickencoop Chinaman and follows the further adventures of Tam Lum, the original work's protagonist.

Stereotypes of Asian Americans and traditional Chinese folklore are common themes in much of his work. Many of his works revolve around criticism of the racism in the United States. Frank Chin has accused other Asian American writers, particularly Maxine Hong Kingston, of furthering such stereotypes and misrepresenting the traditional stories. Chin also has been highly critical of American writer Amy Tan for her telling of Chinese-American stories, indicating that her body of work has furthered and reinforced stereotypical views of this group. On a radio program, Chin has also debated the scholar Yunte Huang regarding the latter's evaluation of Charlie Chan in his writing. This discussion was later evaluated on the activist blog "Big WOWO."

In addition to his work as an author and playwright, Frank Chin has also worked extensively with Japanese American resisters of the draft in WWII. His novel, Born in the U.S.A., is dedicated to this subject. Chin was one of several writers (Jeffery Paul Chan, Lawson Fusao Inada, and Shawn Wong of CARP, Combined Asian American Resources Project) who worked to republish John Okada's novel No-No Boy in the 1970s; Chin contributed an afterword which can be found in every reprinting of the novel. Chin has appeared in Jeff Adachi's The Slanted Screen, a 2006 documentary film about stereotypical depictions of Asian males in American cinema. Chin was also an instrumental organizer for the first Day of Remembrance.

Chin is also a musician. In the mid-1960s, he taught Robbie Krieger, guitarist for The Doors, how to play the flamenco guitar. After a stroke in 1990, he lost his ability to play the guitar and, temporarily, to laugh.

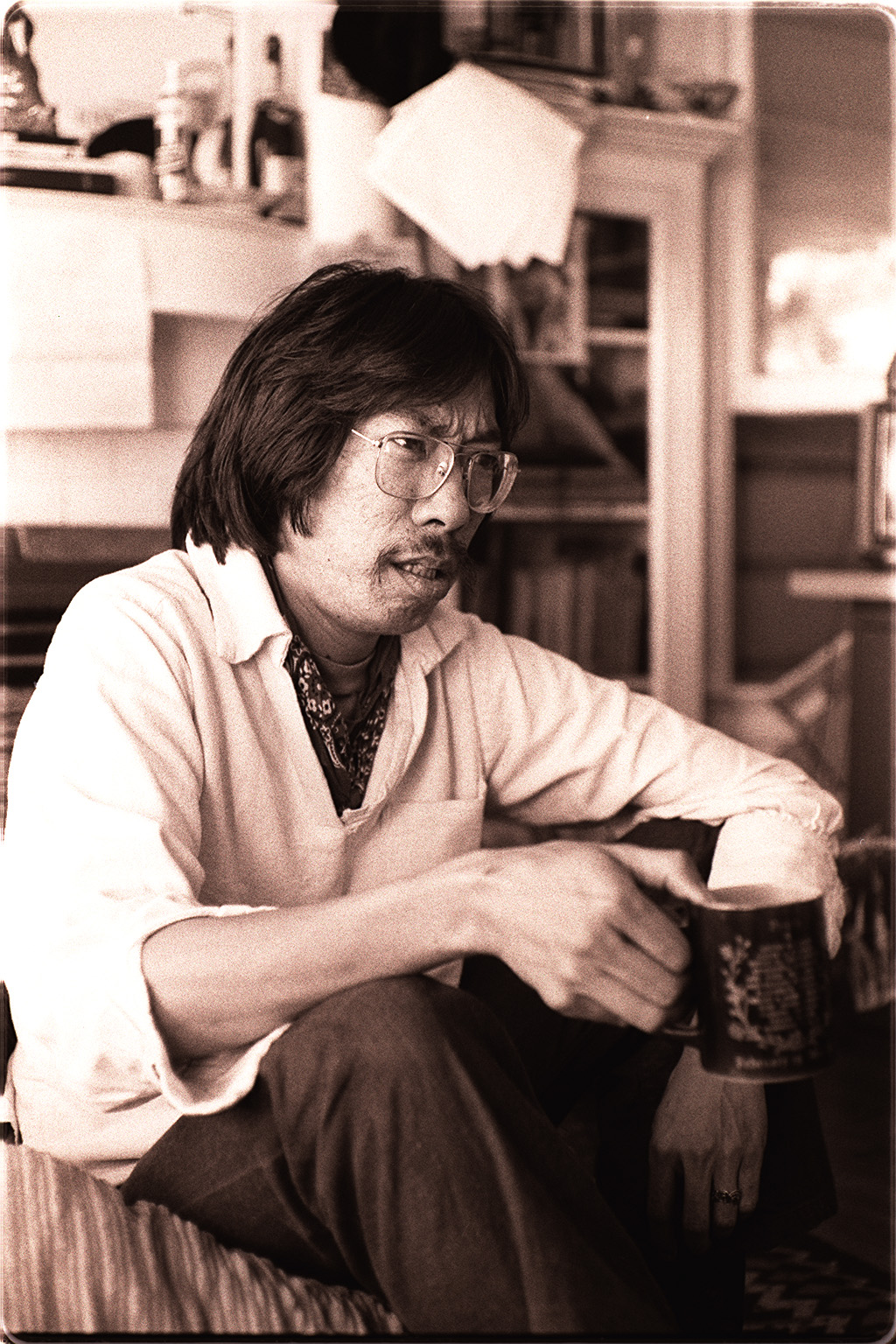
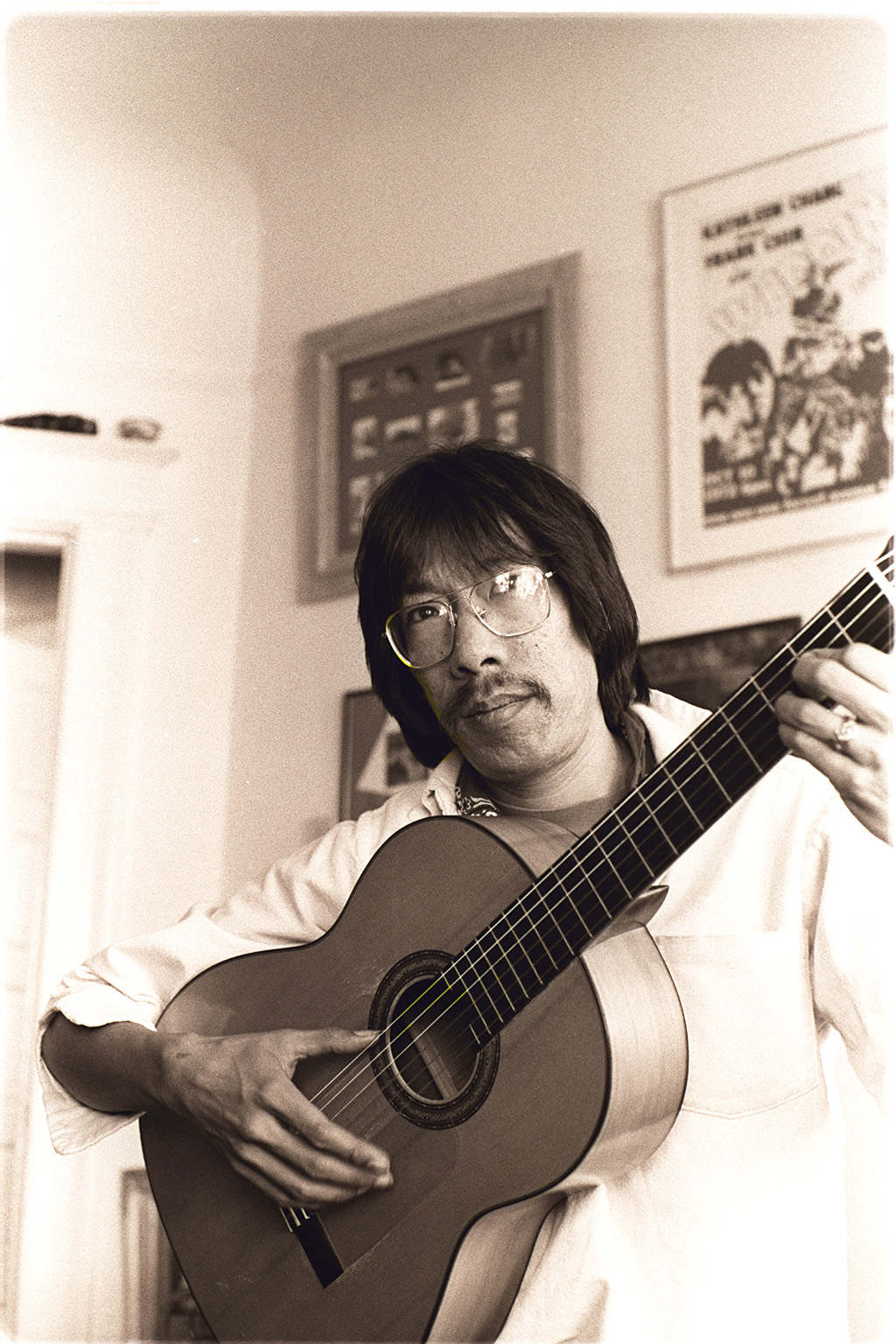
Frank Chin in San Francisco, 1975.

Chin was married to the activist, writer, and performance artist Kathy Chang for five years in the 1970s.

== Bibliography ==
=== Plays ===
- The Chickencoop Chinaman (1971) the first play by an Asian American to be produced as a mainstream New York theater production.
- The Year of the Dragon (1974) ISBN 0-295-95833-2
- Gee Pop! (1976) An unpublished play about Charlie Chan which was produced by East West Players. Elements of this play would appear in some of Chin's later work.
- Oofty Goofty (1983) A parable play which went through a workshop development and rehearsals directed by Chin, although it ultimately went unproduced.

=== Books ===
- Yardbird Reader Volume 3 (1974) (co-editor, contributor)
- Aiiieeeee! An Anthology of Asian-American Writers (1974) (Co-editor, contributor) ISBN 0-385-01243-8
- The Chinaman Pacific and Frisco R.R. Co. (1988) ISBN 0-918273-44-7
- Donald Duk (1991) ISBN 0-918273-83-8
- The Big Aiiieeeee!: An Anthology of Chinese American and Japanese American Literature (1991) (Co-editor, contributor) ISBN 0-452-01076-4
- Gunga Din Highway (1994) ISBN 1-56689-037-3
- Bulletproof Buddhists and Other Essays (1998) ISBN 0-8248-1959-4
- Born in the USA: A Story of Japanese America, 1889-1947 (2002) ISBN 0-7425-1852-3
- The Confessions of a Number One Son: The Great Chinese American Novel (2015) ISBN 978-0-8248-4755-5

=== Works in anthologies ===
- Food for All His Dead, in The Young American Writers (1967) (Richard Kostelanetz, ed.) ISBN 0-932360-04-1
- Goong Hai Fot Choi, in 19 Necromancers from Now (1970) (Ishmael Reed ed.) OCLC 603510235
- Racist Love in Seeing Through Shuck (1972) co-authored with Jeffery Paul Chan (Richard Kostelanetz, ed.) ISBN 0345026764
- Food for All His Dead, in Asian-American Authors (1972) (Kai-yu Hsu and Helen Palubinskas, ed.) ISBN 0395240395
- The Year of the Dragon (excerpt), in Modern American Scenes for Student Actors (1978) (Wynn Handman, ed.) ISBN 0-553-14559-2
- How to Watch a Chinese Movie with the Right "i" in Bamboo Ridge Press Number Five: New Moon (December 1979-February 1980) (Eric Chock and Darrell H.Y. Lum, ed.)
- The Most Popular Book in China, in Quilt 4 (1984) (Ishmael Reed and Al Young, ed.) ISBN 0931676088
- Confessions of a Chinatown Cowboy (excerpts), in American Childhoods: An Anthology (1987) (David W. McCullough, ed.) ISBN 0-3165-5544-4
- The Only Real Day, in The Before Columbus Foundation Fiction Anthology, Selections from the American Book Awards 1980–1990 (1992) ISBN 0-393-30832-4
- Railroad Standard Time, in Growing Up Asian American: An Anthology (1993) (Maria Hong, ed.) ISBN 0688112668
- Yes, Young Daddy, in Coming of age in America : a multicultural anthology (1994) (Mary Frosch, ed.) ISBN 9781565841468
- The Mother "I" (excerpt from Gunga Din Highway), in On a Bed of Rice: An Asian American Erotic Feast (1995) (Geraldine Kudaka, ed.) ISBN 9780385476409
- Rendezvous, in Asian American Literature: A Brief Introduction and Anthology (1996) (Shawn Wong, ed.) ISBN 978-0673469779
- Railroad Standard Time, in Growing Up Ethnic in America (1999) (Maria Mazziotti Gillan and Jennifer Gillan, ed.) ISBN 0-14-028063-4
- Pidgin Contest Along I-5, in Writing Home: Award-Winning Literature from the New West (1999) (Brian Bouldrey, ed.) ISBN 9781890771225
- Donald Duk (excerpt), in Asian-American Literature: An Anthology (1999) (Shirley Geok-lin Lim, ed.) ISBN 0844217298
- The Chickencoop Chinaman (excerpt), in Monologues for Actors of Color: Men (2000) (Roberta Uno, ed.) ISBN 9780878300709
- Railroad Standard Time, in Bold Words: A Century of Asian American Writing (2001) (Rajini Srikanth, ed.) ISBN 0813529662
- The Only Real Day, in American Short Stories since 1945 (2001) (John G. Parks ed.) ISBN 0195131320
- Pearl Harbor Revisited, in Asian Americans on War & Peace (2002) (Russell Leong and Don Nakanishi ed.) ISBN 9780934052368
- Pidgin Contest Along I-5, in Crossing Into America: The New Literature of Immigration (2003) (Louis Mendoza and Subramanian Shankar, ed.) ISBN 9781565847200
- An Introduction to Chinese- and Japanese-American Literature, in From Totems to Hip-Hop: A Multicultural Anthology of Poetry Across the Americas, 1900-2002 (2003) co-authored with Jeffery Paul Chan, Lawson Fusao Inada, and Shawn Wong (Ishmael Reed ed.) ISBN 1560254580
- Come All Ye Asian American Writers of the Real and the Fake (excerpt), in A Companion to Asian American Studies (2005) (Kent A. Ono, ed.) ISBN 9780470996928

== Movies ==
The Year of the Dragon was an adaptation of Chin's play of the same name. Starring George Takei, the film was televised in 1975 as part of the PBS Great Performances series.

As an actor, Chin, appeared as an extra in the riot scene of the made-for-TV movie adaptation of Farewell to Manzanar. Chin was one of several Asian American writers who appeared in the movie; Shawn Wong and Lawson Fusao Inada, who, like Chin were co-editors of the anthology Aiiieeeee!, also acted in the riot scene.

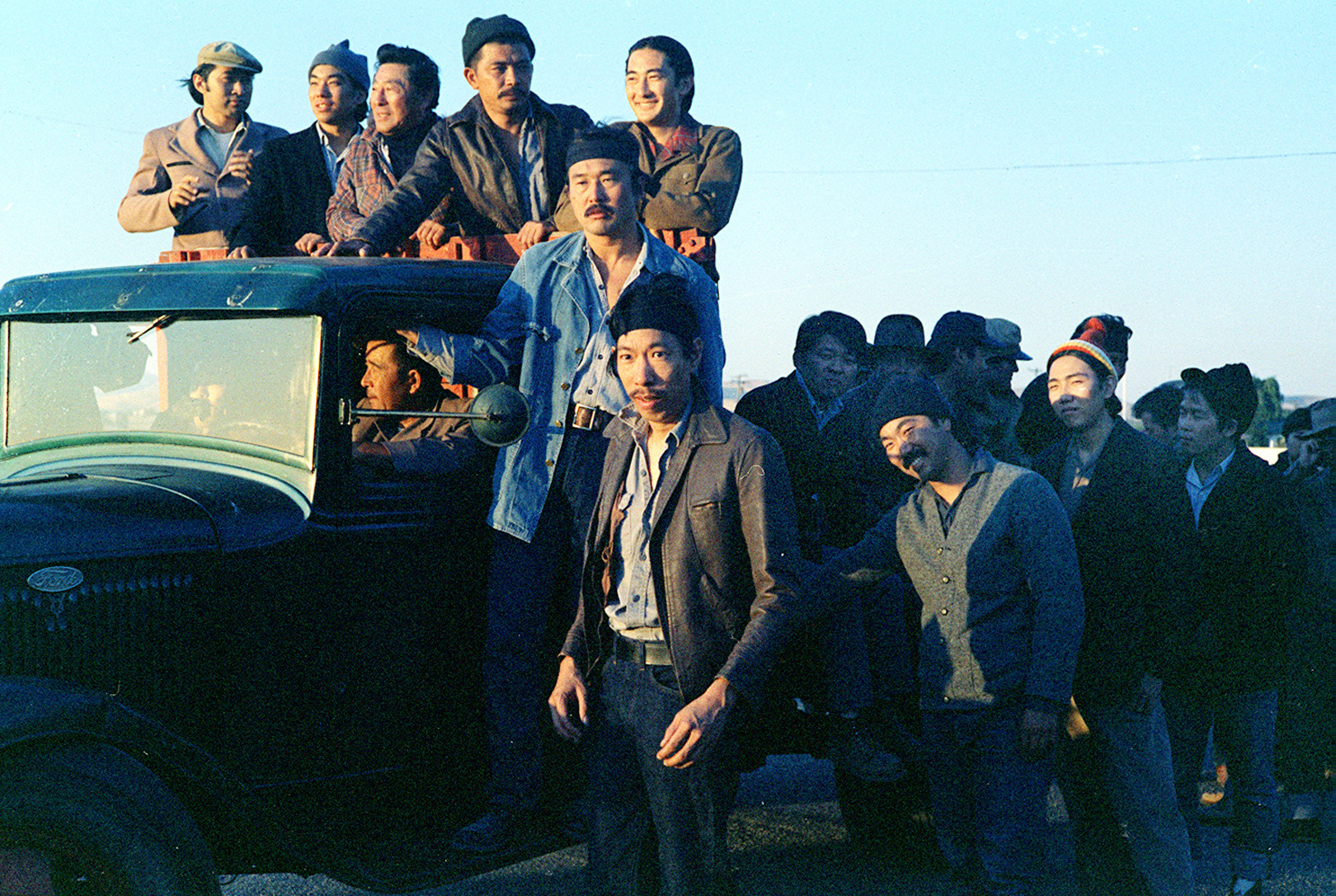
A snapshot from director John Korty's "Farewell to Manzanar." Chin is in the foreground, with Lawson Inada directly behind.

Chin would go on to criticize the movie in the May 1976 issue of Mother Jones.

=== Documentaries ===
What's Wrong with Frank Chin is a 2005 biographical documentary, directed by Curtis Choy, about Chin's life.

Frank Chin was interviewed in the documentary The Slanted Screen (2006), directed by Jeff Adachi, about the representation of Asian and Asian American men in Hollywood.

Chin wrote the script for the 1967 documentary And Still Champion! The Story of Archie Moore. Chin's script was narrated by actor Jack Palance. Some of Chin's experiences would be worked into his first play, in which the protagonist is making a documentary about a boxer.

Chin researched and hosted Chinaman's Chance (1972) an Ene Riisna directed documentary focusing on the conditions of Chinatown communities in America. Interview subjects included Roland Winters, Betty Lee Sung, and Ben Fee.

Chin also directed a documentary short in 1972, The Last Temple about the Taoist temple in Hanford, California, which dates back to 1893, and the effort to preserve and restore it.

Theatre Communications Group produced the Legacy Leaders of Color Video Project, a series highlighting influential figures in the American minority theaters. Set to be released in 2017, one of the episodes focuses on Frank Chin, his time with the Asian American Theater Company, and Chin's influence.

In 2019, It Takes a Lunatic a Netflix distributed documentary about Wynn Handman was released. Handman had produced Chin's two plays at the American Place Theatre, and Chin was one of the interview subjects.

Be Water, a 2020 episode of the ESPN documentary series 30 for 30 about Bruce Lee, featured archival footage of Chin.

Archival footage of Chin being interviewed at the first Day of Remembrance appeared in the PBS documentary Betrayed: Surviving an American Concentration Camp from 2022.

== See also ==
- Chinese American literature
- List of Asian American writers
