= Guthrie Theater production history =

List of plays and performances

The Guthrie Theater is a center for theater performance, production, education, and professional training in Minneapolis, Minnesota. The following is a chronological list of the plays and performances that it has produced or presented. Production information from 1963 through the 2005–06 season is sourced primarily from The Guthrie Theater: Images, History, and Inside Stories and The Guthrie Theater.

== 1960s ==
Artistic Directors: Tyrone Guthrie (1963–66), Douglas Campbell (1966–67), no named artistic director (1968–69)

Stages: Thrust stage on Vineland Place, Crawford Livingston Theater (second thrust stage) in St. Paul, The Other Place

Directors (Vineland Place): Joseph Anthony, Edward Payson Call, Douglas Campbell, Tyrone Guthrie, Robert Lanchester, Philip Manor, John Olin, Stephen Porter, Mel Shapiro, Alan Schneider, Maurice Valency

Actors (partial listing): Paul Ballantyne, Fran Bennett, Raye Birk, Zoe Caldwell, Douglas Campbell, Helen Carey, Len Cariou, Patricia Conolly, Hume Cronyn, David Feldshuh, Rita Gam, Ellen Geer, Peter Michael Goetz, George Grizzard, Charles Keating, Linda Kelsey, James Lawless, Michael Moriarty, Robert Pastene, Richard Russell Ramos, Ken Ruta, Gale Sondergaard, Jessica Tandy

=== 1963 ===
==== Vineland Place ====
- Hamlet – by William Shakespeare
- The Miser – by Molière
- The Three Sisters – by Anton Chekhov
- Death of a Salesman – by Arthur Miller

=== 1964 ===
==== Vineland Place ====
- Henry V – by William Shakespeare
- Saint Joan – by George Bernard Shaw
- The Glass Menagerie – by Tennessee Williams
- Volpone – by Ben Jonson

=== 1965 ===
==== Vineland Place ====
- Richard III – by William Shakespeare
- The Way of the World – by William Congreve
- The Cherry Orchard – by Anton Chekhov
- The Caucasian Chalk Circle – by Bertolt Brecht
- The Miser – by Molière

=== 1966 ===
==== Vineland Place ====
- The Skin of Our Teeth – by Thornton Wilder
- The Dance of Death – by August Strindberg
- As You Like It – by William Shakespeare
- The Doctor's Dilemma – by George Bernard Shaw
- S.S. Glencairn – by Eugene O'Neill

=== 1967 ===
==== Vineland Place ====
- The Shoemaker's Holiday – by Thomas Dekker
- Thieves' Carnival – by Jean Anouilh
- Harpers Ferry – by Barrie Stavis
- The House of Atreus – based on Oresteia by Aeschylus, adapted by John Lewin
- The Visit – by Friedrich Dürrenmatt adapted by Maurice Valency

=== 1968 ===
==== Vineland Place ====
- Twelfth Night – by William Shakespeare
- Serjeant Musgrave's Dance – by John Arden
- The Master Builder – by Henrik Ibsen
- The Resistible Rise of Arturo Ui – by Bertolt Brecht
- Merton of the Movies – by Marc Connelly and George S. Kaufman
- The House of Atreus – based on Oresteia by Aeschylus, adapted by John Lewin

==== Crawford Livingston Theater ====
- She Stoops to Conquer – by Oliver Goldsmith
- Tango – by Sławomir Mrożek
- Enrico IV – by Luigi Pirandello

==== The Other Place ====
- Blood of an Englishman – by John Lewin
- The Jealous Husband and The Flying Doctor – by Molière
- Little Murders – by Jules Feiffer
- Red Cross – by Sam Shepard
- The Indian Wants the Bronx – by Israel Horovitz
- The Man with the Flower in his Mouth – by Luigi Pirandello
- Quirk – by Omar Shapli
- Halloween – by Leonard Melfi
- Charlie – by Sławomir Mrożek
- Brecht on Brecht – by Bertolt Brecht

==== On tour ====
- The House of Atreus – based on Oresteia by Aeschylus, adapted by John Lewin
- The Resistible Rise of Arturo Ui – by Bertolt Brecht

=== 1969 ===
==== Vineland Place ====
- Julius Caesar – by William Shakespeare
- The Beauty Part – by S. J. Perelman
- The Homecoming – by Harold Pinter
- Mourning Becomes Electra – by Eugene O'Neill
- Uncle Vanya – by Anton Chekhov

==== Crawford Livingston Theater ====
- The Alchemist – by Ben Jonson
- Ardele – by Jean Anouilh

==== The Other Place ====
- The Measures Taken – by Bertolt Brecht
- The Dutchman – Leroi Jones
- A Slight Ache – by Harold Pinter
- Krapp's Last Tape – by Samuel Beckett
- The Hostage – by Brendan Behan
- The Ghost Dancer – by Fred Gaines

== 1970s ==
Artistic Directors: no named artistic director (1970), Michael Langham (1971–77), Alvin Epstein (1978–80)

Stages: Thrust stage on Vineland Place, The Other Place, Guthrie 2 on the West Bank

Directors (Vineland Place): Rae Allen, Michael Bawtree, Robert Benedetti, Michael Blakemore, Len Cariou, Eric Christmas, Jon Cranney, Ron Daniels, Anatoly Efros, Alvin Epstein, David Feldshuh, Edward Gilbert, Thomas Gruenewald, Adrian Hall, Nick Havinga, Israel Hicks, John Hirsch, Stephen Kanee, Michael Langham, Eugene Lion, Thomas MacAnna, Robert David MacDonald, Emily Mann, Philip Manor, Tom Moore, Steven Robman, Ken Ruta, Mark Schifter, Kenneth Welsh, David Wheeler

Actors (partial listing): Paul Ballantyne, Fran Bennett, James Blendick, Blair Brown, Barbara Bryne, Helen Carey, Len Cariou, Jeff Chandler, Patricia Conolly, David Feldshuh, Tovah Feldshuh, Peter Michael Goetz, Von Johnson, Charles Keating, Linda Kelsey, Nicholas Kepros, Mark Lamos, Karen Landry, Frank Langella, James Lawless, Robert Pastene, Richard Russell Ramos, Ken Ruta, Kenneth Welsh, Dianne Wiest

=== 1970 ===
==== Vineland Place ====
- The Venetian Twins – by Carlo Goldoni, adapted by Robert David MacDonald
- Ceremonies in Dark Old Men – by Lonne Elder III
- The Tempest – by William Shakespeare
- A Man's a Man – by Bertolt Brecht
- A Play – by Aleksandr Solzhenitsyn, adapted by Paul Avila Mayer

==== The Other Place ====
- Silence and Landscape – by Harold Pinter
- Don Pimperlin's Love of Belisa in His Garden – by Federico García Lorca
- Kumaliza – by C.L. Burton
- The Madness of Lady Bright – by Lanford Wilson
- Stars and Stripes Forever – by Fred Gaines
- The Labyrinth – by Fernando Arrabal
- Winners – by Brian Friel
- Baal – by Bertolt Brecht
- Encore, Food for Thought, and A Mild Case of Death – by David Korr
- Madam Popov and Wet Dream by God – by Gladden Schrock

=== 1971–72 ===
==== Vineland Place ====
- Cyrano de Bergerac – by Edmond Rostand
- The Taming of the Shrew – by William Shakespeare
- A Touch of the Poet – by Eugene O'Neill
- Misalliance – by George Bernard Shaw
- The Diary of a Scoundrel – by Aleksandr Ostrovsky

==== On tour ====
- Fables Here and Then – by David Feldshuh and Guthrie actors

=== 1972–73 ===
==== Vineland Place ====
- A Midsummer Night's Dream – by William Shakespeare
- Of Mice and Men – by John Steinbeck
- The Relapse – by Sir John Vanbrugh
- An Italian Straw Hat – by Eugène Labiche
- Oedipus the King – by Sophocles
- A Christmas Carol – by Charles Dickens
- Cyrano, a new musical version – book and lyrics by Anthony Burgess, music by Michael J. Lewis

==== On tour ====
- Of Mice and Men – by John Steinbeck

=== 1973–74 ===
==== Vineland Place ====
- Becket – by Jean Anouilh
- Oedipus the King – by Sophocles
- The Government Inspector – by Nikolai Gogol
- Juno and the Paycock – by Seán O'Casey
- I, Said the Fly – by June Havoc
- Waiting for Godot – by Samuel Beckett
- The Merchant of Venice – by William Shakespeare
- The Miracle Man – by Erik Brogger, adapted from Molière

==== On tour ====
- The Portable Pioneer and Prairie Show – by David Chambers and Mel Marvin

=== 1974–75 ===
==== Vineland Place ====
- King Lear – by William Shakespeare
- Love's Labour's Lost – by William Shakespeare
- The Crucible – by Arthur Miller
- Tartuffe – by Molière
- The School for Scandal – by Richard Brinsley Sheridan

==== On tour ====
- Everyman – by Anonymous

=== 1975–76 ===
==== Vineland Place ====
- Arsenic and Old Lace – by Joseph Kesselring
- The Caretaker – by Harold Pinter
- A Streetcar Named Desire – by Tennessee Williams
- Loot – by Joe Orton
- Mother Courage – by Bertolt Brecht
- Under Milk Wood – by Dylan Thomas
- Private Lives – by Noël Coward
- A Christmas Carol – by Charles Dickens
- Measure for Measure – by William Shakespeare

=== 1976–77 ===
==== Vineland Place ====
- The Matchmaker – by Thornton Wilder
- Doctor Faustus – by Christopher Marlowe
- Cat on a Hot Tin Roof – by Tennessee Williams
- Rosencrantz and Guildenstern Are Dead – by Tom Stoppard
- An Enemy of the People – by Henrik Ibsen
- The Winter's Tale – by William Shakespeare
- A Christmas Carol – by Charles Dickens
- The National Health – by Peter Nichols

==== Guthrie 2 ====
- The Collected Works of Billy the Kid – by Michael Ondaatje
- The Future Pit – by Menzies McKillop
- Anulla Allen – Autobiography of a Survivor – by Emily Mann and Anulla Allen
- Triple bill:
  - Cold – by Michael Casale
  - Glutt – by Gladden Schrock
  - Waterman – by Frank B. Ford
- Pilk's Madhouse – adapted by Ken Campbell
- Up the Seminole – by Keane Bonath
- Hello and Goodbye – by Athol Fugard
- Open Shut – by Robert Hellman

==== On tour ====
- A Party for Two – by Dominique Serrand and Barbara Berlovitz

=== 1977–78 ===
==== Vineland Place ====
- She Stoops to Conquer – by Oliver Goldsmith
- A Moon for the Misbegotten – by Eugene O'Neill
- La Ronde – by Arthur Schnitzler
- Catsplay – by István Örkény
- The White Devil – by John Webster
- Design for Living – by Noël Coward
- A Christmas Carol – by Charles Dickens
- Pantagleize – by Michel de Ghelderode

==== Guthrie 2 ====
- Ashes – by David Rudkin
- Mouth on Fire, Not I, Play, and Krapp's Last Tape – by Samuel Beckett
- The Conversion of Aaron Weiss – by Mark Medoff
- Dear Liar – by Jerome Kilty
- Dark Pony and Reunion – by David Mamet

==== On tour ====
- A Moon for the Misbegotten – by Eugene O'Neill
- Clowns, Lovers & Kings – by Tom Hegg and Susan Dafoe

=== 1978–79 ===
==== Vineland Place ====
- The Pretenders – by Henrik Ibsen
- Teibele and Her Demon – by Isaac Bashevis Singer and Eve Friedman
- Boy Meets Girl – by Samuel and Bella Spewack
- Bonjour, là, bonjour – by Michel Tremblay
- Hamlet – by William Shakespeare
- Marriage – by Nikolai Gogol, adapted by Barbara Field
- A Christmas Carol – by Charles Dickens
- The Beggar's Opera – by John Gay

==== Guthrie 2 ====
- Flashbacks: Christmas Past, Christmas Present – adapted by Scott Rubsam and Gail Smogard
- My Cup Runneth Over – by Robert Patrick
- Surprise, Surprise – by Michel Tremblay
- Vienna Notes – by Richard Nelson
- Litko – by David Mamet
- On Mount Chimbarazo – by Tankred Dorst
- Angel, Honey, Baby, Darling Dear – by Robert Patrick
- A Kurt Weill Cabaret
- Martha Schlamme in Concert
- Little Eyolf – by Henrik Ibsen
- Émigrés – by Sławomir Mrożek

==== On tour ====
- Marriage – by Nikolai Gogol, adapted by Barbara Field

=== 1979–80 ===
==== Vineland Place ====
- The Rivals – by Richard Brinsley Sheridan
- Right of Way – by Richard Lees
- The Glass Menagerie – by Tennessee Williams
- Monsieur de Molière – by Mikhail Bulgakov
- Endgame – by Samuel Beckett
- Romeo and Juliet – by William Shakespeare
- A Christmas Carol – by Charles Dickens
- You Can't Take It With You – by George Kaufman and Moss Hart

==== On tour ====
- The Glass Menagerie – by Tennessee Williams
- Americana – adapted by Scott Rubsam
- I Remember – by Stephen Willems
- Even as the Sun – by Warren Green

== 1980s ==
Artistic Directors: Liviu Ciulei (1980–85), Garland Wright (1985–95)

Stages: Thrust stage on Vineland Place, Guthrie Lab (black box) in the Warehouse District

Directors (Vineland Place): JoAnne Akalaitis, Kazimierz Braun, Lee Breuer, Edward Payson Call, Liviu Ciulei, Jon Cranney, Howard Dallin, Robert Falls, Richard Foreman, Kenneth Frankel, Athol Fugard, William Gaskill, Edward Gilbert, Gary Gisselman, Derek Goldby, Edward Hastings, Douglas Hughes, Michael Kahn, Stephen Kanee, George Keathley, Michael Langham, Michael Maggio, Emily Mann, Christopher Markle, Marshall W. Mason, Patrick Mason, Vivian Matalon, Tony Mockus, Timothy Near, Richard Ooms, Lucian Pintilie, Peter Sellars, Andrei Şerban, Harold Stone, Douglas Turner Ward, Les Waters, Stan Wojewodski Jr., Garland Wright

=== 1980–81 ===
==== Vineland Place ====
- Wild Oats – by John O'Keefe
- Camille – by Alexandre Dumas, fils
- The Tavern – by George M. Cohan
- Desire Under the Elms – by Eugene O'Neill
- Mary Stuart – by Friedrich Schiller
- A Christmas Carol – by Charles Dickens
- Arms and the Man – by George Bernard Shaw
- Macbeth – by William Shakespeare

==== On tour ====
- The Tavern – by George M. Cohan
- A Midsummer Night's Dream – by William Shakespeare, adapted by Stephen Willems
- Soldiering – by Stephen Willems

=== 1981–82 ===
==== Vineland Place ====
- The Tempest – by William Shakespeare
- Don Juan – by Molière
- Our Town – by Thornton Wilder
- Foxfire – by Hume Cronyn and Susan Cooper
- Eve of Retirement – by Thomas Bernhard
- Eli: A Mystery Play – by Nelly Sachs
- A Christmas Carol – by Charles Dickens
- Candide – by Len Jenkin, adapted from the novel by Voltaire
- As You Like It – by William Shakespeare

==== On tour ====
- The Rainmaker – by N. Richard Nash
- Trouble Begins at Eight: A Mark Twain Offering – by Christopher Markle

=== 1982–83 ===
==== Vineland Place ====
- Summer Vacation Madness – by Carlo Goldoni
- Requiem for a Nun – by William Faulkner
- The Marriage of Figaro – by Beaumarchais
- Room Service – by Jon Murray and Allen Boretz
- Heartbreak House – by George Bernard Shaw
- A Christmas Carol – by Charles Dickens
- Entertaining Mr. Sloane – by Joe Orton
- Peer Gynt – by Henrik Ibsen

==== On tour ====
- Talley's Folly – by Lanford Wilson

=== 1983–84 ===
==== Vineland Place ====
- "Master Harold"...and the Boys – by Athol Fugard
- The Threepenny Opera – by Bertolt Brecht and Kurt Weill
- Guys and Dolls – by Damon Runyon
- The Entertainer – by John Osborne
- The Seagull – by Anton Chekhov
- A Christmas Carol – by Charles Dickens
- The Importance of Being Earnest – by Oscar Wilde
- Hedda Gabler – by Henrik Ibsen

==== On tour ====
- The Importance of Being Earnest – by Oscar Wilde

=== 1984–85 ===
==== Vineland Place ====
- A Soldier's Play – by Charles Fuller
- Hang on to Me – songs by George Gershwin and Ira Gershwin, book by Maxim Gorky
- Three Sisters – by Anton Chekhov
- Tartuffe – by Molière
- 'Night Mother – by Marsha Norman
- Twelfth Night – by William Shakespeare
- A Christmas Carol – by Charles Dickens
- Anything Goes – by Cole Porter

==== On tour ====
- Foxfire – by Hume Cronyn and Susan Cooper

=== 1985–86 ===
==== Vineland Place ====
- Great Expectations – by Charles Dickens
- Cyrano de Bergerac – by Edmond Rostand
- A Midsummer Night's Dream – by William Shakespeare
- Candida – by George Bernard Shaw
- Execution of Justice – by Emily Mann
- A Christmas Carol – by Charles Dickens
- On the Razzle – by Tom Stoppard
- The Rainmaker – by N. Richard Nash

==== On tour ====
- Great Expectations – by Charles Dickens, adapted by Barbara Field

=== 1986–87 ===
==== Vineland Place ====
- Saint Joan – by George Bernard Shaw
- The Merry Wives of Windsor – by William Shakespeare
- The Birthday Party – by Harold Pinter
- On the Verge – by Eric Overmeyer
- Rhinoceros – by Eugène Ionesco
- A Christmas Carol – by Charles Dickens
- Double Infidelities – by Pierre Marivaux
- The Gospel at Colonus – by Lee Breuer

=== 1987–88 ===
==== Vineland Place ====
- The Misanthrope – by Molière
- The Piggy Bank – by Eugène Labiche & Alfred Delacour
- The Bacchae – by Euripides
- The House of Bernarda Alba – by Federico García Lorca
- Leon & Lena (and Lenz) – by Georg Buchner
- A Christmas Carol – by Charles Dickens
- Richard III – by William Shakespeare

=== 1988–89 ===
==== Vineland Place ====
- The Glass Menagerie – by Tennessee Williams
- The Imaginary Invalid – by Molière
- Frankenstein – Playing with Fire – by Barbara Field
- Hamlet – by William Shakespeare
- The Wild Duck – by Henrik Ibsen
- A Christmas Carol – by Charles Dickens
- Pravda – by David Hare and Howard Brenton

==== Guthrie Lab ====
- Cymbeline – by William Shakespeare

=== 1989–90 ===
==== Vineland Place ====
- Harvey – by Mary Chase
- Uncle Vanya – by Anton Chekhov
- The Duchess of Malfi – by John Webster
- Volpone – by Ben Jonson
- The Screens – by Jean Genet
- A Christmas Carol – by Charles Dickens
- Candide – by Hugh Wheeler and Leonard Bernstein

==== Guthrie Lab ====
- Measure for Measure – by William Shakespeare

== 1990s ==
Artistic Directors: Garland Wright (1985–95), Joe Dowling (1995–2015)

Stages: Thrust stage on Vineland Place, Guthrie Lab (black box)

Directors (Vineland Place): JoAnne Akalaitis, Libby Appel, Lou Bellamy, Michael Bogdanov, Risa Brainin, Mark Brokaw, Joe Dowling, Michael Engler, Sheldon Epps, David Esbjornson, David Gordon, Douglas Hughes, Bill T. Jones, Sari Ketter, Michael Langham, Marion McClinton, Conall Morrison, Neil Munro, Charles Newell, Richard Ooms, Dominique Serrand, Bartlett Sher, Kristoffer Tabori, David Thacker, Jennifer Tipton, Douglas C. Wager, Laird Williamson, Robert Woodruff, Garland Wright

=== 1990–91 ===
==== Vineland Place ====
- Richard II – by William Shakespeare
- Henry IV, Part 1 – by William Shakespeare
- Henry V – by William Shakespeare
- The Skin of Our Teeth – by Thornton Wilder
- The Front Page – by Ben Hecht and Charles MacArthur
- A Christmas Carol – by Charles Dickens
- Medea – by Euripides

==== Guthrie Lab ====
- Troilus and Cressida – by William Shakespeare

=== 1991–92 ===
==== Vineland Place ====
- Death of a Salesman – by Arthur Miller
- The Man Who Came to Dinner – by George Kaufman and Moss Hart
- The Illusion – by Pierre Corneille
- Fantasio – by Alfred de Musset
- The Tempest – by William Shakespeare
- A Christmas Carol – by Charles Dickens
- Marat/Sade – by Peter Weiss

==== Guthrie Lab ====
- Pericles – by William Shakespeare

=== 1992–93 ===
==== Vineland Place ====
- Iphigeneia at Aulis – by Euripides
- Agamemnon – by Aeschylus
- Electra – by Sophocles
- Private Lives – by Noël Coward
- The Winter's Tale – by William Shakespeare
- The Seagull – by Anton Chekhov
- A Christmas Carol – by Charles Dickens
- The Good Hope – by Herman Heijermans

==== Guthrie Lab ====
- The Merchant of Venice – by William Shakespeare

=== 1993–94 ===
==== Vineland Place ====
- Too Clever by Half – by Alexander Ostrovski
- Naga Mandala – by Girish Karnad
- The Triumph of Love – by Pierre Marivaux
- Othello – by William Shakespeare
- A Christmas Carol – by Charles Dickens
- A Woman of No Importance – by Oscar Wilde
- Dream on Monkey Mountain – by Derek Walcott

==== Guthrie Lab ====
- Peer Gynt – by Henrik Ibsen

=== 1994–95 ===
==== Vineland Place ====
- The Rover – by Aphra Behn
- The Play's the Thing – by Ferenc Molnár
- Home – by David Storey
- The Broken Jug – by Heinrich von Kleist
- As You Like It – by William Shakespeare
- A Christmas Carol – by Charles Dickens
- Macbeth – by William Shakespeare
- K: Impressions of The Trial – by Franz Kafka

==== Guthrie Lab ====
- Mother Courage and Her Children – by Bertolt Brecht

=== 1995–96 ===
==== Vineland Place ====
- King Lear – by William Shakespeare
- The Royal Family – by George Kaufman and Edna Ferber
- The Firebugs – by Max Frisch
- Big White Fog – by Theodore Ward
- A Christmas Carol – by Charles Dickens
- Babes in Arms – by Richard Rodgers and Lorenz Hart

==== Guthrie Lab ====
- Short Plays:
  - Tone Clusters – by Joyce Carol Oates
  - Naomi in the Living Room – by Christopher Durang
  - The Zoo Story – by Edward Albee
- Old Times – by Harold Pinter
- K: Impressions of The Trial (revival) – by Franz Kafka

=== 1996–97 ===
==== Vineland Place ====
- The Cherry Orchard – by Anton Chekhov
- She Stoops to Conquer – by Oliver Goldsmith
- Philadelphia, Here I Come! – by Brian Friel
- A Doll's House – by Henrik Ibsen
- A Christmas Carol – by Charles Dickens
- The Price – by Arthur Miller
- A Midsummer Night's Dream – by William Shakespeare

==== Guthrie Lab ====
- Simpatico – by Sam Shepard
- Mystery of the Rose Bouquet – by Manuel Puig
- Many Colors Make the Thunder-King – by Femi Osofisan

=== 1997–98 ===
==== Vineland Place ====
- You Can't Take It with You – by George Kaufman and Moss Hart
- Blithe Spirit – by Noël Coward
- Racing Demon – by David Hare
- A Christmas Carol – by Charles Dickens
- The Playboy of the Western World – by John Millington Synge
- Thunder Knocking on the Door – by Keith Glover
- Much Ado About Nothing – by William Shakespeare

==== Guthrie Lab ====
- Black No More – by Syl Jones

=== 1998–99 ===
==== Vineland Place ====
- The Importance of Being Earnest – by Oscar Wilde
- A Month in the Country – by Brian Friel
- The Venetian Twins – by Carlo Goldoni
- A Christmas Carol – by Charles Dickens
- The Magic Fire – by Lillian Garrett-Groag
- Julius Caesar – by William Shakespeare
- Summer and Smoke – by Tennessee Williams

==== Guthrie Lab ====
- Molly Sweeney – by Brian Friel
- Gross Indecency – by Moisés Kaufman
- Lysistrata – by Aristophanes

=== 1999–2000 ===
==== Vineland Place ====
- The School for Scandal – by Richard Brinsley Sheridan
- Ah, Wilderness! – by Eugene O'Neill
- Martin Guerre – by Alain Boublil and Claude-Michel Schönberg
- A Christmas Carol – by Charles Dickens
- Misalliance – by George Bernard Shaw
- The Darker Face of the Earth – by Rita Dove
- The Plough and the Stars – by Seán O'Casey

==== Guthrie Lab ====
- Sweeney Todd – music and lyrics by Stephen Sondheim, book by Hugh Wheeler
- Mr. Peters' Connections – by Arthur Miller
- Lake Hollywood – by John Guare
- Side Man – by Warren Leight

==== On tour ====
- A Midsummer Night's Dream – by William Shakespeare

== 2000s ==
Artistic Director: Joe Dowling (1995–2015)

Stages: Thrust stage on Vineland Place, Guthrie Lab, Wurtele Thrust Stage, McGuire Proscenium Stage, Dowling Studio (black box)

Directors

Thrust stage: Michael Bogdanov, Timothy Bond, Tim Carroll, Joe Dowling, David Esbjornson, Leigh Fondakowski, Gary Gisselman, Doug Hughes, Sari Ketter, Mark Lamos, Marcela Lorca, Ethan McSweeny, John Miller-Stephany, Lisa Peterson, Peter Rothstein, Dominique Serrand, Casey Stangl, Douglas C. Wager

McGuire Proscenium Stage: Joe Dowling, Gary Gisselman, Wendy C. Goldberg, Michael Greif, Mark Lamos, Marcela Lorca, Lisa Peterson, Peter Rothstein, Rob Ruggiero, Casey Stangl, Susan Stroman, Francesca Zambello

=== 2000–01 ===
==== Vineland Place ====
- Twelfth Night – by William Shakespeare
- Hedda Gabler – by Henrik Ibsen
- To Fool the Eye – adaptation by Jeffrey Hatcher of Léocadia by Jean Anouilh
- A Christmas Carol – by Charles Dickens
- Who's Afraid of Virginia Woolf? – by Edward Albee
- Hamlet – by William Shakespeare (a Royal National Theatre production presented by the Guthrie Theater)
- Once in a Lifetime – by Moss Hart and George S. Kaufman

==== Guthrie Lab ====
- The Invention of Love – by Tom Stoppard
- Blood Wedding – by Federico García Lorca
- In the Blood – by Suzan-Lori Parks

==== On tour ====
- Molly Sweeney – by Brian Friel

season play guides

=== 2001–02 ===
==== Vineland Place ====
- Amadeus – by Peter Shaffer
- Da – by Hugh Leonard
- A Christmas Carol – by Charles Dickens
- Antony and Cleopatra – by William Shakespeare
- The Canterbury Tales – by Geoffrey Chaucer
- All My Sons – by Arthur Miller

==== Guthrie Lab ====
- The Carpetbagger's Children – by Horton Foote
- Merrily We Roll Along – music and lyrics by Stephen Sondheim, book by George Furth
- Thief River – by Lee Blessing

==== On tour ====
- Ah, Wilderness! – by Eugene O'Neill

season play guides

=== 2002–03 ===
==== Vineland Place ====
- Resurrection Blues – by Arthur Miller
- The Comedy of Errors – by William Shakespeare
- A Christmas Carol – by Charles Dickens
- Mrs. Warren's Profession – by George Bernard Shaw
- Six Degrees of Separation – by John Guare
- Three Sisters – by Anton Chekhov

==== Guthrie Lab ====
- Good Boys – by Jane Martin
- The Chairs – by Eugène Ionesco
- Wintertime – by Charles L. Mee
- Top Girls – by Caryl Churchill

==== On tour ====
- The Stuff of Dreams – by Bill Corbett

season play guides

=== 2003–04 ===
==== Vineland Place ====
- Pride and Prejudice – by Jane Austen
- The Night of the Iguana – by Tennessee Williams
- Twelfth Night – by William Shakespeare (a Shakespeare's Globe production presented by the Guthrie WorldStage Series)
- A Christmas Carol – by Charles Dickens
- Crowns – by Regina Taylor
- Romeo and Juliet – by William Shakespeare
- The Pirates of Penzance – by W.S. Gilbert and Arthur Sullivan

==== Guthrie Lab ====
- Nickel and Dimed – by Joan Holden
- Othello – by William Shakespeare
- Boston Marriage – by David Mamet
- Blue/Orange – by Joe Penhall

==== Riverfront site of future (2006) theater building ====
- Carmen Funebre – by production ensemble (a Teatr Biuro Podróży production presented by the Guthrie WorldStage Series and the Walker Arts Center)

==== On tour ====
- Othello – by William Shakespeare

season play guides

=== 2004–05 ===
==== Vineland Place ====
- Death of a Salesman – by Arthur Miller
- Pygmalion – by George Bernard Shaw
- A Christmas Carol – by Charles Dickens
- Oedipus – by Ellen McLaughlin
- As You Like It – by William Shakespeare
- She Loves Me – music by Jerry Bock, lyrics by Sheldon Harnick, book by Joe Masteroff

==== Guthrie Lab ====
- Lady with a Lapdog – by Anton Chekhov
- 4.48 Psychosis – by Sarah Kane (a Royal Court Theatre production presented by the Guthrie WorldStage Series)
- The Sex Habits of American Women – by Julie Marie Myatt
- Pericles – by William Shakespeare
- The Notebook and The Proof – by Agota Kristof (a De Onderneming Theatre production presented by the Guthrie WorldStage Series)
- A Body of Water – by Lee Blessing

==== On tour ====
- Death of a Salesman – by Arthur Miller
- Freezing Paradise: An Evening with Kevin Kling – by Kevin Kling

season play guides

=== 2005–06 ===
==== Vineland Place ====
- His Girl Friday – by John Guare
- The Constant Wife – by W. Somerset Maugham
- Intimate Apparel – by Lynn Nottage
- Measure for Measure – by William Shakespeare (a Shakespeare's Globe production presented by the Guthrie WorldStage Series)
- A Christmas Carol – by Charles Dickens
- The People's Temple – by Leigh Fondakowski
- Hamlet – by William Shakespeare

==== Guthrie Lab ====
- Macbeth – by William Shakespeare (an Out of Joint Theatre Company production presented by the Guthrie WorldStage Series)

==== Pantages Theatre ====
- Arlecchino: Servant of Two Masters – by Carlo Goldoni (a Piccolo Teatro di Milano production presented by the Guthrie WorldStage Series)

season play guides

=== 2006–07 ===
==== Wurtele Thrust Stage ====
- The Great Gatsby – by F. Scott Fitzgerald
- Lost in Yonkers – by Neil Simon
- A Christmas Carol – by Charles Dickens
- The Merchant of Venice – by William Shakespeare
- 1776 – music and lyrics by Sherman Edwards, book by Peter Stone

==== McGuire Proscenium Stage ====
- DruidSynge – by John Millington Synge (a Druid Theatre Company production presented by the Guthrie WorldStage Series)
- The Real Thing – by Tom Stoppard
- Edgardo Mine – by Alfred Uhry
- The Glass Menagerie – by Tennessee Williams
- Major Barbara – by George Bernard Shaw

==== Dowling Studio ====
- The Falls – by Jeffrey Hatcher
- Circle Around the Island – by Marcus Quiniones
- B.F.A Actor Training Program Class of 2007:
  - Lizards ... by Megan Mostyn-Brown
  - Shadowgrass by Dan Dietz
- Boats on a River – by Julie Marie Myatt

season play guides

=== 2007–08 ===
==== Wurtele Thrust Stage ====
- Jane Eyre – by Charlotte Brontë, adapted by Alan Stanford
- King Lear – by William Shakespeare (a Royal Shakespeare Company production presented by the Guthrie WorldStage Series)
- The Seagull – by Anton Chekov (a Royal Shakespeare Company production presented by the Guthrie WorldStage Series)
- A Christmas Carol – by Charles Dickens, adapted by Barbara Field
- Peer Gynt – by Henrik Ibsen, translated and adapted by Robert Bly
- A Midsummer Night's Dream – by William Shakespeare
- The Government Inspector – by Nikolai Gogol, adapted by Jeffrey Hatcher

==== McGuire Proscenium Stage ====
- Private Lives – by Noël Coward
- The Home Place – by Brian Friel
- Third – by Wendy Wasserstein
- Secret Fall of Constance Wilde – by Thomas Kilroy

==== Dowling Studio ====
- Pen – by David Marshall Grant
- 9 Parts of Desire – by Heather Raffo
- B.F.A Actor Training Program Class of 2008:
  - Be Here Now – by Carson Kreitzer
  - When I Was a Ghost – by Deborah Stein
  - The End – by Sheri Wilner
- French Twist – choreographed by Joe Chvala (a Flying Foot Forum production presented by the Guthrie Theater)
- The Ugly One – by Marius von Mayenburg, translated by Maja Zade
- After a Hundred Years – by Naomi Iizuka

season play guides

=== 2008–09 ===
==== Wurtele Thrust Stage ====
- A View from the Bridge – by Arthur Miller
- A Christmas Carol – by Charles Dickens, adapted by Barbara Field
- The Two Gentlemen of Verona – by William Shakespeare
- Caroline, or Change – book and lyrics by Tony Kushner, music by Jeanine Tesori
- When We Are Married – by J. B. Priestley

==== McGuire Proscenium Stage ====
- Little House on the Prairie – based on the books by Laura Ingalls Wilder, book by Rachel Sheinkin, music by Rachel Portman, lyrics by Donna di Novelli
- Shadowlands – by William Nicholson
- A Delicate Balance – by Edward Albee
- The Intelligent Homosexual's Guide to Capitalism and Socialism with a Key to the Scriptures – by Tony Kushner

==== Dowling Studio ====
- Old Wicked Songs – by Jon Marans (a Theater Latté Da production presented by the Guthrie Theater)
- The Caretaker – by Harold Pinter
- Blackbird – by David Harrower (a Pillsbury House Theatre production presented by the Guthrie Theater)
- Henry V – by William Shakespeare, co-production with The Acting Company
- Happy Days – by Samuel Beckett
- By the Bog of Cats – by Marina Carr (a Frank Theatre production presented by the Guthrie Theater)
- B.F.A Actor Training Program Class of 2009:
  - Writer 1272 – by Vincent Delaney
  - What May Fall – by Peter Gil-Sheridan
- Tiny Kushner: An evening of short plays by Tony Kushner
- My Father's Bookshelf – a collaborative creation by Live Action Set (a Live Action Set production presented by the Guthrie Theater)

season play guides

=== 2009–10 ===
==== Wurtele Thrust Stage ====
- The Importance of Being Earnest – by Oscar Wilde
- A Christmas Carol – by Charles Dickens, adapted by Barbara Field
- Macbeth – by William Shakespeare
- M. Butterfly – by David Henry Hwang
- A Streetcar Named Desire – by Tennessee Williams

==== McGuire Proscenium Stage ====
- Ella – book by Jeffrey Hatcher, conceived by Rob Ruggiero and Dyke Garrison
- Faith Healer – by Brian Friel
- Romeo and Juliet – by William Shakespeare, co-production with The Acting Company
- Brief Encounter – by Noël Coward, adapted by Emma Rice (a Kneehigh Theatre production presented by the Guthrie WorldStage Series)
- Dollhouse – by Rebecca Gilman, based on A Doll's House by Henrik Ibsen
- The Scottsboro Boys – music by John Kander, lyrics by Fred Ebb, book by David Thompson

==== Dowling Studio ====
- Super Monkey – by production ensemble (a Jon Ferguson Theater production presented by the Guthrie Theater)
- Tales from the Book of Longing – concept by Stuart Pimsler and Suzanne Costello (a Stuart Pimsler Dance & Theater production presented by the Guthrie Theater)
- Northern Lights/Southern Cross: Tales from the Other Side of the World – by Kevin Kling, music by Pat Rix (an Interact Theater production in collaboration with Tutti Ensemble presented by the Guthrie Theater)
- Violet – music by Jeanine Tesori, lyrics and book by Brian Crawley, based on "The Ugliest Pilgrim" by Doris Betts (a Theater Latte Da production presented by the Guthrie Theater)
- Coward's Women – music by Noël Coward, concept by Michael Todaro (a Producing House production presented by the Guthrie Theater)
- Yellow Face – by David Henry Hwang (a Mu Performing Arts production presented by the Guthrie Theater)
- B.F.A Actor Training Program Class of 2010:
  - Tiny Disasters – by Cory Hinkle and the cast and director
- Circle Mirror Transformation – by Annie Baker

==== Walker Art Center's McGuire Theater ====
- The Walworth Farce – by Enda Walsh (a Druid Theatre production presented by the Guthrie WorldStage Series and the Walker Art Center)

season play guides

== 2010s ==
Artistic Directors: Joe Dowling (1995–2015), Joseph Haj (2015–present)

Stages: Wurtele Thrust Stage, McGuire Proscenium Stage, Dowling Studio

Directors

Wurtele Thrust Stage: Libby Appel, Lou Bellamy, Lileana Blain-Cruz, David Bolger, Timothy Bond, Gary Gisselman, Joe Chvala, Joe Dowling, Wendy Goldberg, Joseph Haj, Lavina Jadhwani, Lauren Keating, Marcela Lorca, Christopher Luscombe, Marion McClinton, Ethan McSweeny, Rob Melrose, John Miller-Stephany, Jonathan Munby, Lisa Peterson, Roger Rees, Sarah Rasmussen, Blake Robison, Leigh Silverman, Francesca Zambello, Mary Zimmerman

McGuire Proscenium Stage: Maria Aitken, Christopher Bayes, Ian Belknap, Lou Bellamy, Desdemona Chiang, Rachel Chavkin, Valerie Curtis-Newton, Joe Dowling, David Esbjornson, Wendy Goldberg, Ramin Gray, Joseph Haj, David Ivers, Terry Johnson, Michael Kahn, Marcela Lorca, Taibi Magar, Meredith McDonough, Patricia McGregor, Ethan McSweeny, Jeffrey Meanza, John Miller-Stephany, Lisa Peterson, John Rando, Emma Rice, Lisa Rothe, Peter Rothstein, Mark Rucker, Mark Rylance, Joel Sass, Dominique Serrand, Casey Stangl, Max Stafford-Clark, Lyndsey Turner, Claire van Kampen, Kate Whoriskey, Mary Zimmerman

=== 2010–11 ===
==== Wurtele Thrust Stage ====
- The Master Butchers Singing Club – adapted by Marsha Norman from the book by Louise Erdrich
- A Christmas Carol – by Charles Dickens, adapted by Crispin Whittell
- The Winter's Tale – by William Shakespeare
- Arsenic and Old Lace – by Joseph Kesselring
- H.M.S. Pinafore – by Gilbert and Sullivan

==== McGuire Proscenium Stage ====
- The Great Game: Afghanistan – by Richard Bean, Lee Blessing, David Edgar, David Greig, Amit Gupta, Ron Hutchinson, Stephen Jeffreys, Abi Morgan, Ben Ockrent, Simon Stephens, Colin Teevan and Joy Wilkinson (a Tricycle Theatre production presented by the Guthrie WorldStage Series)
- The 39 Steps – adapted by Patrick Barlow
- Ma Rainey's Black Bottom – by August Wilson (a Penumbra Theatre Company production presented by the Guthrie Theater)
- Arms and the Man – by George Bernard Shaw
- God of Carnage – by Yasmina Reza

==== Dowling Studio ====
- Cowboy Versus Samurai – by Michael Golamco (a Mu Performing Arts production presented by the Guthrie Theater)
- Little Eyes – by Cory Hinkle (a Workhaus Collective production presented by the Guthrie Theater)
- Song of Extinction – by EM Lewis (a Theater Latté Da production presented by the Guthrie Theater)
- Heaven – music by Chan Poling (a Flying Foot Forum production presented by the Guthrie Theater)
- B.F.A Actor Training Program Class of 2011:
  - THE ORESTEIA VARIATIONS, based on the Oresteia trilogy:
    - Until We See Three of Everything – by Cory Hinkle
    - Reverb – by Mat Smart

season play guides

=== 2011–12 ===
==== Wurtele Thrust Stage ====
- Much Ado About Nothing – by William Shakespeare
- A Christmas Carol – by Charles Dickens, adapted by Crispin Whittell
- Cat on a Hot Tin Roof – by Tennessee Williams
- Hay Fever – by Noël Coward
- The Amen Corner – by James Baldwin (A Penumbra Theatre Company production presented by the Guthrie Theater)
- The Sunshine Boys – by Neil Simon

==== McGuire Proscenium Stage ====
- The Burial at Thebes – by Seamus Heaney
- Charley's Aunt – by Brandon Thomas
- End of the Rainbow – by Peter Quilter
- Time Stands Still – by Donald Margulies
- Roman Holiday – music and lyrics by Cole Porter, book by Paul Blake, based on the Paramount Pictures motion picture

==== Dowling Studio ====
- The Edge Of Our Bodies – by Adam Rapp
- Julius Caesar – by William Shakespeare (The Acting Company in association with the Guthrie Theater)
- The Birds – by Conor McPherson, from the short story by Daphne du Maurier
- B.F.A Actor Training Program Class of 2012:
  - O BRAVE NEW WORLD, based on Shakespeare's The Tempest:
    - Golden Age – by Gregory S. Moss
    - In Game or Real – by Victoria Stewart
- Are You Now or Have You Ever Been... – by Carlyle Brown (a Carlyle Brown & Company production presented by the Guthrie Theater).
- Anytown – music by Bruce Springsteen and the E Street Band (a Shapiro & Smith Dance production presented by the Guthrie Theater)
- Swimming with My Mother – concept by David Bolger (a CoisCéim Dance Theatre production presented by the Guthrie WorldStage Series)
- Trick Boxing – by Brian Sostek and Megan McClellan (a Sossy Mechanics production presented by the Guthrie Theater)
- The Brothers Size – by Tarell Alvin McCraney (a Pillsbury House Theatre and Mount Curve Company production presented by the Guthrie Theater)

season play guides

=== 2012–13 ===
==== Wurtele Thrust Stage ====
- Tales from Hollywood – by Christopher Hampton
- A Christmas Carol – by Charles Dickens, adapted by Crispin Whittell
- Long Day's Journey into Night – by Eugene O’Neill
- Twelfth Night – by William Shakespeare (a Propeller production presented by the Guthrie WorldStage Series)
- The Taming of the Shrew – by William Shakespeare (a Propeller production presented by the Guthrie WorldStage Series)
- The Primrose Path – by Crispin Whittell, based on the novel Home of the Gentry by Ivan Turgenev
- Pride and Prejudice – adapted by Simon Reade from the book by Jane Austen

==== McGuire Proscenium Stage ====
- Appomattox – by Christopher Hampton
- The Servant of Two Masters – by Carlo Goldoni, adapted by Constance Congdon from a translation by Christina Sibul (a Yale Repertory Theatre production presented by the Guthrie Theater)
- Other Desert Cities – by Jon Robin Baitz
- Nice Fish – by Mark Rylance and Louis Jenkins, based on the poetry of Louis Jenkins
- Clybourne Park – by Bruce Norris

==== Dowling Studio ====
- Embers – by Christopher Hampton, based on the novel by Sándor Márai as translated by Carol Brown Janeway
- As You Like It – by William Shakespeare (The Acting Company in association with the Guthrie Theater)
- Buzzer – by Tracey Scott Wilson (a Pillsbury House Theatre production presented by the Guthrie Theater)
- B.F.A Actor Training Program Class of 2013:
  - Those Who Favor Fire – by Aditi Brennan Kapil
  - South Street – by Carson Kreitzer
- Yellow Fever – by R.A. Shiomi (a Mu Performing Arts production presented by the Guthrie Theater)

season play guides

=== 2013–14 ===
==== Wurtele Thrust Stage ====
- Uncle Vanya – by Anton Chekov
- A Christmas Carol – by Charles Dickens, adapted by Crispin Whittell
- Othello – by William Shakespeare
- Crimes of the Heart – by Beth Henley
- My Fair Lady – book and lyrics by Alan Jay Lerner, music by Frederick Loewe

==== McGuire Proscenium Stage ====
- Tribes – by Nina Raine
- Born Yesterday – by Garson Kanin
- Tristan and Yseult – by Anna Maria Murphy and Carl Grose, adapted by Emma Rice (a Kneehigh Theatre production presented by the Guthrie WorldStage Series)
- The Mountaintop – by Katori Hall (a Penumbra Theatre Company production presented by the Guthrie Theater)
- Hamlet – by William Shakespeare (The Acting Company in association with the Guthrie Theater)
- Rosencrantz and Guildenstern Are Dead – by Tom Stoppard (The Acting Company in association with the Guthrie Theater)
- Our Country's Good – by Timberlake Wertenbaker (an Out of Joint and Octagon Theatre Bolton production presented by the Guthrie WorldStage Series)
- Vanya and Sonia and Masha and Spike – by Christopher Durang

==== Dowling Studio ====
- Moon Show 143 – by Kyle Loven (presented by the Guthrie Theater)
- How to be a Korean Woman – written and performed by Sun Mee Chomet (presented by the Guthrie Theater)
- An Iliad – by Lisa Peterson and Denis O'Hare, adapted from Homer as translated by Robert Fagles
- Skiing on Broken Glass – by David Goldstein
- Freud's Last Session – by Mark St. Germain
- Abe Lincoln and Uncle Tom in the White House – by Carlyle Brown (a Carlyle Brown & Company production presented by the Guthrie Theater)
- B.F.A Actor Training Program Class of 2014:
  - Peter Piper – by Trista Baldwin
  - The Hidden People: Part One – by Joe Waechter
- The Three Musketeers – by John Heimbuch, adapted from the novel by Alexandre Dumas (a Walking Shadow Theatre Company production presented by the Guthrie Theater)

=== 2014–15 ===
==== Wurtele Thrust Stage ====
- The Heidi Chronicles – by Wendy Wasserstein
- A Christmas Carol – by Charles Dickens, adapted by Crispin Whittell
- A Midsummer Night's Dream – by William Shakespeare
- The Crucible – by Arthur Miller
- The Music Man – music, lyrics, and book by Meredith Willson, story by Meredith Willson and Franklin Lacey

==== McGuire Proscenium Stage ====
- The White Snake – by Mary Zimmerman, based on the Chinese fable
- The Cocktail Hour – by A. R. Gurney
- Mr. Burns, a Post-Electric Play – by Anne Washburn
- Juno and the Paycock – by Seán O'Casey
- Stage Kiss – by Sarah Ruhl

==== Dowling Studio ====
- Marcus, or the Secret of Sweet – by Tarell Alvin McCraney (a Pillsbury House Theatre and Mount Curve Company production presented by the Guthrie Theater)
- A Steady Rain – by Keith Huff (an Odyssey Theatre Ensemble production presented by the Guthrie Theater)
- Relics – an immersive performance created by Sarah Agnew, Nick Golfis and Chantal Pavageaux (presented by the Guthrie Theater)
- Jonah and the Whale: A New Musical – book by Tyler Mills, music and lyrics by David Darrow and Blake Thomas (a 7th House Theater production presented by the Guthrie Theater)
- A Connecticut Yankee in King Arthur's Court – by Jeffrey Hatcher, adapted from the novel by Mark Twain (The Acting Company in association with the Guthrie Theater)
- Telling: Minnesota 2015 – The Telling Project presented by the Guthrie Theater
- The Nature Crown – conceived by Jon Ferguson, with text by Dominic Orlando (a Theatre Forever production presented by the Guthrie Theater)
- Macbeth – by William Shakespeare (The Acting Company in association with the Guthrie Theater)
- B.F.A Actor Training Program Class of 2015:
  - Blue Stockings – by Jessica Swale
  - Snapshots – a series of scenes from the dramatic canon
- Choir Boy – by Tarell Alvin McCraney

=== 2015–16 ===
==== Wurtele Thrust Stage ====
- To Kill a Mockingbird – adapted by Christopher Sergel, based on the novel by Harper Lee
- A Christmas Carol – by Charles Dickens, adapted by Crispin Whittell
- Pericles – by William Shakespeare (in association with Oregon Shakespeare Festival and The Folger Theatre)
- A 24-Decade History of Popular Music: The 20th Century Abridged - by Taylor Mac (Singular Voices/Plural Perspectives series)
- Harvey - by Mary Chase
- South Pacific - music by Richard Rodgers, lyrics by Oscar Hammerstein II, book by Oscar Hammerstein II and Joshua Logan

==== McGuire Proscenium Stage ====
- The Events – by David Greig (an Actors Touring Company production presented by the Guthrie WorldStage Series)
- The Cocoanuts – music and lyrics by Irving Berlin, book by George S. Kaufman, adapted by Gregg Coffin
- Two one-act comedies (in association with Shakespeare Theatre Company):
  - The Critic – by Richard Brinsley Sheridan, adapted by Jeffrey Hatcher
  - The Real Inspector Hound – by Tom Stoppard
- Trouble in Mind - by Alice Childress
- Disgraced - by Ayad Akhtar

==== Dowling Studio ====
- The Genealogy of Happenstance – by Allegra J Lingo (presented by the Guthrie Theater)
- U/G/L/Y – by Shá Cage (a Freestyle Theatre production presented by the Guthrie Theater)
- Wrestling Jerusalem – by Aaron Davidman (Singular Voices/Plural Perspectives series)
- The Great Work – book by Grant Sorenson, music and lyrics by David Darrow (a 7th House Theater production presented by the Guthrie Theater)
- The Amish Project – by Jessica Dickey (Singular Voices/Plural Perspectives series)
- You for Me for You – by Mia Chung (a Mu Performing Arts production presented by the Guthrie Theater)
- B.F.A Actor Training Program Class of 2016:
  - Earthquakes in London – by Mike Bartlett
  - Snapshots – a series of scenes from the dramatic canon
- Telling: Minnesota 2016 – The Telling Project presented by the Guthrie Theater
- The Ingenious Gentleman Don Quixote of La Mancha - conceived and created by the company (A Four Humors production presented by the Guthrie Theater)
- Steven Mackey: Orpheus Unsung - conceived by Mark DeChiazza (presented by the Guthrie Theater and the Saint Paul Chamber Orchestra's Liquid Music)

=== 2016–17 ===
==== Wurtele Thrust Stage ====
- Sense and Sensibility – adapted by Kate Hamill, based on the novel by Jane Austen
- A Christmas Carol – by Charles Dickens, adapted by Crispin Whittell
- King Lear – by William Shakespeare
- The Bluest Eye – adapted by Lydia R. Diamond, based on the novel by Toni Morrison
- Sunday in the Park with George – music and lyrics by Stephen Sondheim, book by James Lapine

==== McGuire Proscenium Stage ====
- The Parchman Hour: Songs and Stories of the '61 Freedom Riders – by Mike Wiley
- The Lion in Winter – by James Goldman
- The Royal Family – by George S. Kaufman and Edna Ferber
- Battlefield – adapted by Peter Brook and Marie-Hélène Estienne, based on the Mahabharata and the play by Jean-Claude Carrière (presented by the Guthrie WorldStage Series)
- Refugia – an original idea developed by The Moving Company
- Native Gardens – by Karen Zacarias

==== Dowling Studio ====
- The Trump Card – by Mike Daisey (presented by the Guthrie Theater)
- Home Street Home – by zAmya Theater troupe with playwright Josef Evans (a zAmya Theater Project production presented by the Guthrie Theater)
- Hold These Truths – by Jeanne Sakata
- The Passage, or What Comes of Searching in the Dark – book, music, and lyrics by David Darrow (a 7th House Theater production presented by the Guthrie Theater)
- Promise Land – by Transatlanic Love Affair (a Transatlantic Love Affair production presented by the Guthrie Theater)
- We Are Proud to Present a Presentation About the Herero of Namibia, Formerly Known as Southwest Africa, From the German Sudwestafrika, Between the Years 1884–1915 – by Jackie Sibblies Drury
- She Went To War – The Telling Project presented by the Guthrie Theater
- B.F.A Actor Training Program Class of 2017:
  - The American Clock – by Arthur Miller
- Charles Francis Chan Jr.'s Exotic Oriental Murder Mystery – by Lloyd Suh (a Mu Performing Arts production presented by the Guthrie Theater)
- The New Griots Festival – founded by Josh Wilder and Jamil Jude (presented by the Guthrie Theater)
- The Holler Sessions – by Frank Boyd

=== 2017–18 ===
==== Wurtele Thrust Stage ====
- Romeo and Juliet – by William Shakespeare
- A Christmas Carol – by Charles Dickens, adapted by Crispin Whittell
- Indecent – by Paula Vogel
- Guess Who's Coming to Dinner – by Todd Kreidler, based on the screenplay by William Rose
- West Side Story – based on a conception by Jerome Robbins, music by Leonard Bernstein, lyrics by Stephen Sondheim, book by Arthur Laurents

==== McGuire Proscenium Stage ====
- Watch on the Rhine – by Lillian Hellman
- Leila's Death – by Ali Chahrour (presented by the Guthrie Theater and the Walker Arts Center)
- Blithe Spirit – by Noël Coward
- Familiar – by Danai Gurira
- An Enemy of the People – based on the play by Henrik Ibsen, by Brad Birch
- The Legend of Georgia McBride – by Matthew Lopez

==== Dowling Studio ====
- Mala – by Melinda Lopez (an ArtsEmerson production presented by the Guthrie Theater)
- Birds Sing Differently Here – created by Dylan Fresco, Taous Claire Khazem and Iraqi Voices program participants (an original theater piece presented by the Iraqi and American Reconciliation Project)
- Solo Emerging Artist Celebration
  - Antonio Duke – Tears of the Moon
  - A.P. Lopez – Foray Softly
  - Ifrah Mansour – How to Have Fun in a Civil War
- A People's History – by Mike Daisey (presented by the Guthrie Theater)
- B.F.A Actor Training Program Class of 2018:
  - Argonautika – by Mary Zimmerman, adapted from The Voyage of Jason and the Argonauts
- Under This Roof – by Barbara Kingsley (a Full Circle Theater production presented by the Guthrie Theater)
- Not Every Mountain – by Rude Mechs (a Rude Mechs production presented by the Guthrie Theater)

==== Public spaces in the Guthrie ====
- BAD NEWS! i was there... – by JoAnne Akalaitis (presented by the Guthrie Theater)

==== Walker Art Center's McGuire Theater ====
- 887 – by Robert Lepage (presented by the Guthrie Theater and the Walker Art Center)

=== 2018–19 ===
==== Wurtele Thrust Stage ====
- Frankenstein - Playing with Fire – by Barbara Field, based on the novel Frankenstein by Mary Shelley
- A Christmas Carol – by Charles Dickens, adapted by Crispin Whittell
- As You Like It – by William Shakespeare
- Metamorphoses – by Mary Zimmerman, based on the myths of Ovid
- Guys and Dolls – based on a story and characters of Damon Runyon, music and lyrics by Frank Loesser, book by Jo Swerling and Abe Burrows

==== McGuire Proscenium Stage ====
- Noises Off – by Michael Frayn
- The Great Leap – by Lauren Yee
- Cyrano de Bergerac – by Edmond Rostand, adapted by Joseph Haj
- Floyd's – by Lynn Nottage

==== Dowling Studio ====
- Two Degrees – by Tira Palmquist (a Prime Productions production presented by the Guthrie Theater)
- Hot Funky Butt Jazz – by the Interact ensemble (an Interact production presented by the Guthrie Theater)
- Get Used To It: A Celebration of Queer Artistry
  - Unexploded Ordnances (UXO) – by Lois Weaver, Peggy Shaw, and Hannah Maxwell (a Split Britches production presented by the Guthrie Theater)
  - Martha Graham Cracker's Lashed But Not Leashed – songs by Dito van Reigersberg, David Sweeny, Eliza Hardy, and Vince Federici (presented by the Guthrie Theater)
  - Hi, Are You Single? – by Ryan Haddad (presented by the Guthrie Theater)
- Caught – by Christopher Chen (a Full Circle Theater production presented by the Guthrie Theater)
- Leaves of Grass - Illuminated – by Patrick Scully from the text by Walt Whitman (presented by the Guthrie Theater)

=== 2019–20 ===
==== Wurtele Thrust Stage ====
- The Glass Menagerie – by Tennessee Williams
- A Christmas Carol – by Charles Dickens, adapted by Crispin Whittell
- Twelfth Night – by William Shakespeare - production run ended early due to COVID-19
- Emma – based on the novel by Jane Austen - production canceled due to COVID-19
- Cabaret – book by Joe Masteroff based on the play by John Van Druten and stories by Christopher Isherwood, music by John Kander, lyrics by Fred Ebb - production canceled due to COVID-19

==== McGuire Proscenium Stage ====
- Steel Magnolias – by Robert Harling
- Noura – by Heather Raffo
- The Bacchae – by Euripides, translation by Aaron Poochigian (a SITI Company production presented by the Guthrie) - production run ended early due to COVID-19
- Destiny of Desire – by Karen Zacarías - production canceled due to COVID-19
- Sweat – by Lynn Nottage - production canceled due to COVID-19

==== Dowling Studio ====
- Zafira and the Resistance – by Kathryn Haddad (a New Arab American Theater Works production presented by the Guthrie Theater)
- Fast Company – by Carla Ching (a Theatre Mu production presented by the Guthrie Theater)
- Grey Rock – by Amir Nizar Zuabi (a Remote Theater Project production presented by the Guthrie Theater)
- Jogging – by Hannane Hajj Ali (presented by the Guthrie Theater)

== 2020s ==
Artistic Directors: Joseph Haj (2015–present)

Stages: Wurtele Thrust Stage, McGuire Proscenium Stage, Dowling Studio

=== 2020–21 ===
Season canceled due to COVID-19

=== 2021–22 ===
==== Wurtele Thrust Stage ====
- A Christmas Carol – by Charles Dickens, adapted by Lavina Jadhwani
- The Tempest – by William Shakespeare
- Emma – by Kate Hamill, based on the novel by Jane Austen

==== McGuire Proscenium Stage ====
- What the Constitution Means to Me – by Heidi Schreck
- A Raisin in the Sun – by Lorraine Hansberry
- Sweat – by Lynn Nottage

=== 2022–23 ===
==== Wurtele Thrust Stage ====
- Vietgone – by Qui Nguyen
- A Christmas Carol – by Charles Dickens, adapted by Lavina Jadhwani
- Blues for an Alabama Sky – by Pearl Cleage
- Hamlet — by William Shakespeare
- Into the Woods — by Stephen Sondheim and James Lapine

==== McGuire Proscenium Stage ====
- Sally & Tom – by Suzan-Lori Parks (in association with The Public Theater)
- The Little Prince – by Rick Cummins and John Scoullar, based on the novella by Antoine de Saint-Exupéry
- Born With Teeth – by Liz Duffy Adams (an Alley Theatre production presented by the Guthrie Theater)
- Murder on the Orient Express – by Agatha Christie, adapted for the stage by Ken Ludwig
- Shane – by Karen Zacarías, based on the novel by Jack Schaefer (a co-production with Cincinnati Playhouse in the Park)

=== 2023-24 ===
==== Wurtele Thrust Stage ====
- The Importance of Being Earnest – by Oscar Wilde
- A Christmas Carol – by Charles Dickens, adapted by Lavina Jadhwani
- Dial M for Murder – adapted by Jeffrey Hatcher, from the original story by Frederick Knott
- Richard II, Henry IV, Part 1 and Part 2, and Henry V – by William Shakespeare (presented as one three-part theatrical event)
- English – by Sanaz Toossi (in co-production with Goodman Theatre)

==== McGuire Proscenium Stage ====
- For the People – by Ty Defoe and Larissa Fasthorse
- Art – by Yasmina Reza, translated by Christopher Hampton
- On Beckett – by Bill Irwin (an Irish Repertory Theatre production in association with Octopus Theatricals and presented by the Guthrie Theater)
- Skeleton Crew by Dominique Morisseau
- Little Shop of Horrors – by Howard Ashman and Alan Menken, based on the film by Roger Corman with screenplay by Charles B. Griffith
