= Cradle of Humankind (disambiguation) =

Cradle of Humankind is an archeological site in South Africa.

The Cradle of Humankind or, alternatively Cradle of Humanity, Cradle of Mankind or Cradle of Man may also refer to:

- Human history, the history of humanity
  - For prehistoric life, please see Stone Age or Prehistoric man
- Human evolution, the biological origins of the human species
  - For the geographical origins of the human species, please see Recent African origin of modern humans
- Earth, according to a famous quote by Konstantin Tsiolkovsky
- Creation myth, theological views on the origins of the human species
- Cradle of civilization, areas where the first civilizations developed
- Cradle of Man, a 2005 play by Melanie Marnich
- "The Cradle of Humankind", a song by Flogging Molly from their 2011 album Speed of Darkness
