= Guthrie Theater =

Theater in Minneapolis, Minnesota

Coordinates: 44°58′41″N 93°15′19″W

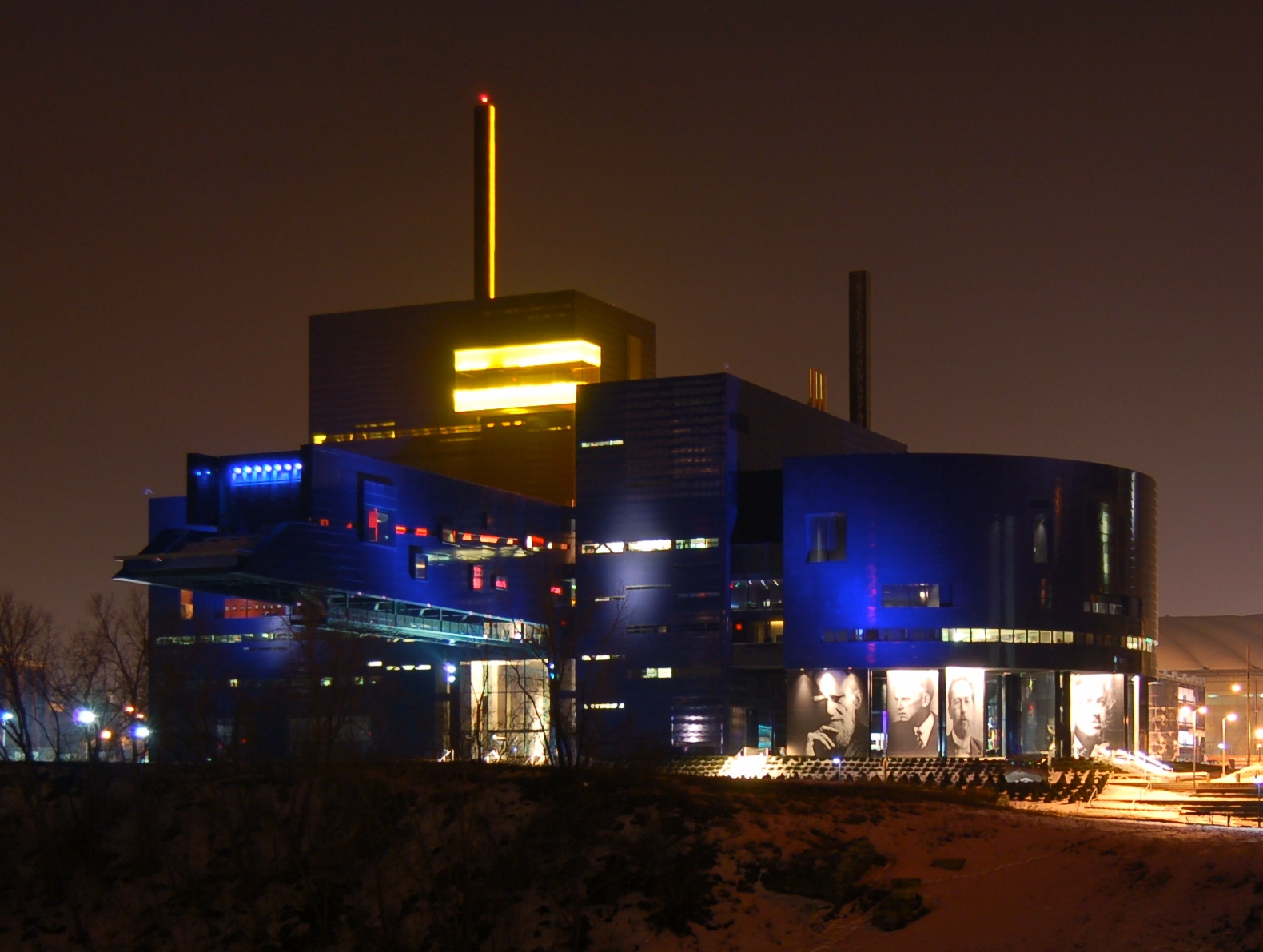
- Guthrie Theater at night
- Interactive map of Guthrie Theater
- Address: 818 South 2nd Street; Minneapolis, Minnesota; United States
- Type: Regional theater

Construction
- Opened: 1963
- Rebuilt: 2006
- Architect: Jean Nouvel

Website
- www.guthrietheater.org

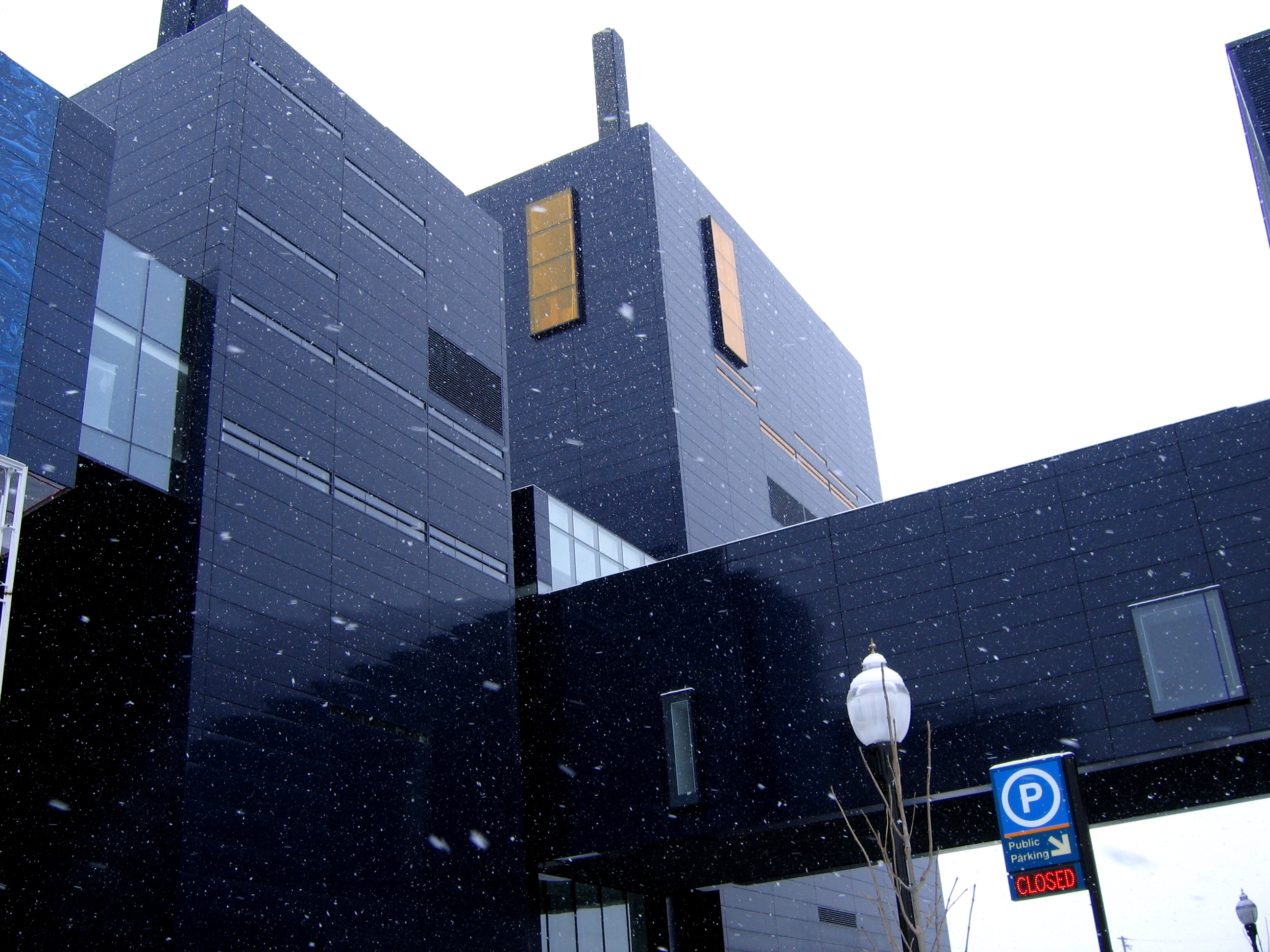
Snow falling at the Guthrie

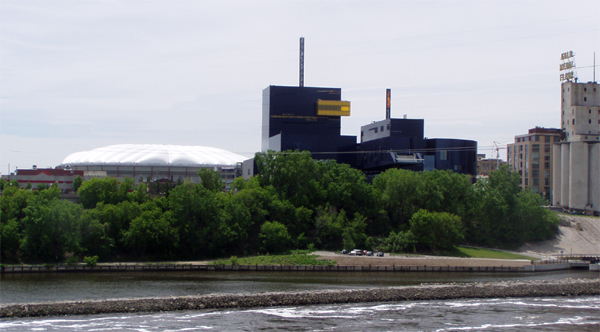
Hubert H. Humphrey Metrodome (left), the Guthrie, the Mill City Museum (right) on the Mississippi River

The Guthrie Theater, founded in 1963, is a center for theater performance, production, education, and professional training in Minneapolis, Minnesota. The concept of the theater was born in 1959 in a series of discussions among Sir Tyrone Guthrie, Oliver Rea and Peter Zeisler. Disenchanted with Broadway, they intended to form a theater with a resident acting company, to perform classic plays in rotating repertory, while maintaining the highest professional standards.

The Guthrie Theater has had two main-stage facilities. The first building was designed by Ralph Rapson and included a 1,441-seat thrust stage designed by Tanya Moiseiwitsch; it was operated from 1963 to 2006. After closing its 2005–2006 season, the theater moved to its current facility, designed by French architect Jean Nouvel.

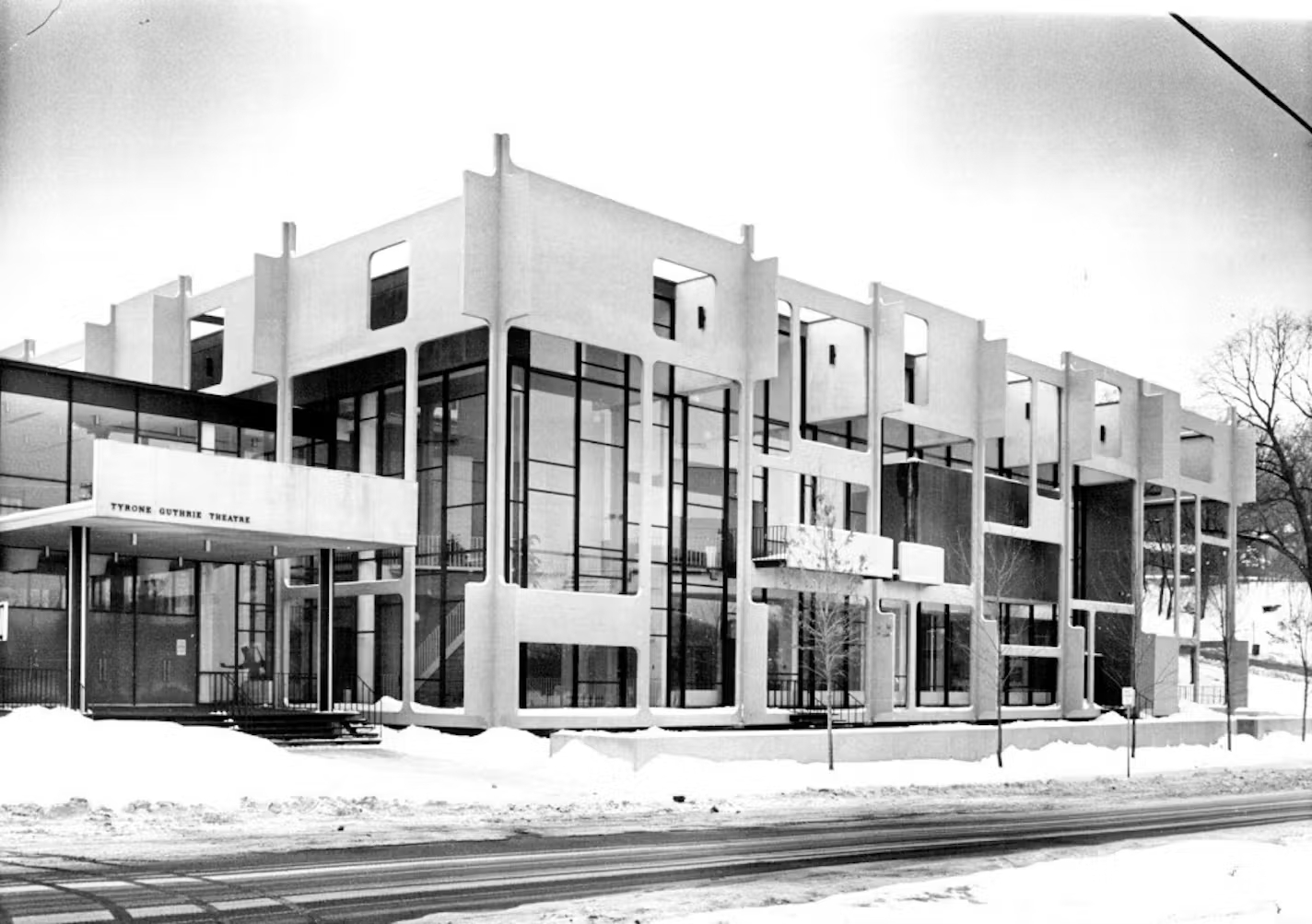
The Guthrie Theater in 1965 with the original exterior designed by Ralph Rapson before it was removed due to moisture in the wood and stucco panels. (Photo from Minnesota Star Tribune)

In 1982, the theater won the Regional Theatre Tony Award.

== History ==
In 1959, Sir Tyrone Guthrie published a small invitation in the drama page of The New York Times soliciting communities' interest and involvement in a resident theater. Out of the seven cities that responded, the Twin Cities showed not only interest but also eagerness for the project.

Frank Whiting, the director of the University of Minnesota Theater, introduced Guthrie to the arts community in the Twin Cities and helped gather support that persuaded Guthrie to locate his theater in Minneapolis. With the help of the newly founded Tyrone Guthrie Theater Foundation, a fundraising effort raised over US$2 million. The new theater was completed in 1963, in time for the May 7 opening of Hamlet. During its first season the Guthrie featured well known stage actors Hume Cronyn, Jessica Tandy and Zoe Caldwell as well as a group of younger actors including George Grizzard, Ellen Geer and Joan van Ark. Tyrone Guthrie served as Artistic Director until 1966, and continued to direct at the theater he founded until 1969, two years before his death. In 1966 Douglas Campbell was named as the next artistic director of the Guthrie, succeeding the theater's founder and namesake.

Throughout the 1960s, the Guthrie found critical acclaim in its productions of Henry V, St. Joan, Caucasian Chalk Circle, Three Sisters and The House of Atreus. In 1968, the Guthrie's production of The House of Atreus was taken on the road for a national tour, a first for a resident theater. Also starting in 1968, the Guthrie established the tradition of producing plays on smaller stages within the Twin Cities area, including the Crawford-Livingston Theater in St. Paul and The Other Place.

In 1971, Michael Langham became the Guthrie's next artistic director, staging classic productions which included Oedipus Rex, Love's Labour's Lost, She Stoops to Conquer, and A Streetcar Named Desire.

After Langham left in 1977, the Guthrie crossed a milestone of sorts when, for the first time in its history, it selected as artistic director the American Alvin Epstein, the first person to hold that post who wasn't previously known within the world of theater as either an established collaborator with, or personal friend of, founder Tyrone Guthrie. Epstein's selection for the post also marked the first time in the theater's history that the position of artistic director was held by an American.

In 1980, Liviu Ciulei replaced Epstein. Ciulei had previously served as the artistic director of Teatrul Bulandra in Romania and had a profound influence on the Guthrie. He challenged audiences with his bold theatrical interpretations and his highly contemporary and international style. Ciulei's interest in theater didn't stop at the productions themselves. Ciulei was a designer and architect, and one of the first things he did was to redesign the theater itself. His changes allowed more structural flexibility in the stage, granting each production a unique physical presentation. While Ciulei was not able to realize all the goals he had envisioned, he was able to maintain and advance the Guthrie's national and international reputation as a first-rate example of American theater, and under his direction, the Guthrie experienced critical success with productions of classics such as Peer Gynt, The Marriage of Figaro, A Midsummer Night's Dream, The Seagull, and Tartuffe. During this period, in 1982, the theater won the Regional Theatre Tony Award. Ciulei also worked to reestablish the Guthrie's commitment to acting ensembles, gathering together a rotating repertory in his last season as artistic director in 1985.

That same year, the Guthrie tapped Garland Wright, who'd previously spent time serving as Ciulei's Associate Artistic Director during the early 1980s, as Ciulei's successor. Wright shared with his predecessor Ciulei a vision for the theater which included the desire to have a second, smaller stage which could serve as a kind of laboratory, enabling exploration of new work and performance techniques. Born from this vision was the Guthrie Laboratory (commonly referred to as the Guthrie Lab) located in the Minneapolis Warehouse District. Wright also shared Ciulei's desire to keep the concept of a resident acting company alive, using his ensembles to great effect. Wright was able to combine critical and popular success with a series of productions that helped reestablish a large, enthusiastic and loyal audience base. Productions from this period include The Misanthrope, Richard III, The Screens, Medea, As You Like It, and a trilogy of Richard II, Henry IV (Parts I and II) and Henry V. Wright also cultivated a series of outreach programs, which were designed to garner expanded interest in theater among young people, involving high school and college instructors in the effort.

Garland Wright announced his resignation as artistic director in 1994, and after an international search for his successor, Joe Dowling was chosen as the Guthrie's seventh artistic director. In 2015, Joseph Haj succeeded Joe Dowling as artistic director.

== Vineland Place ==
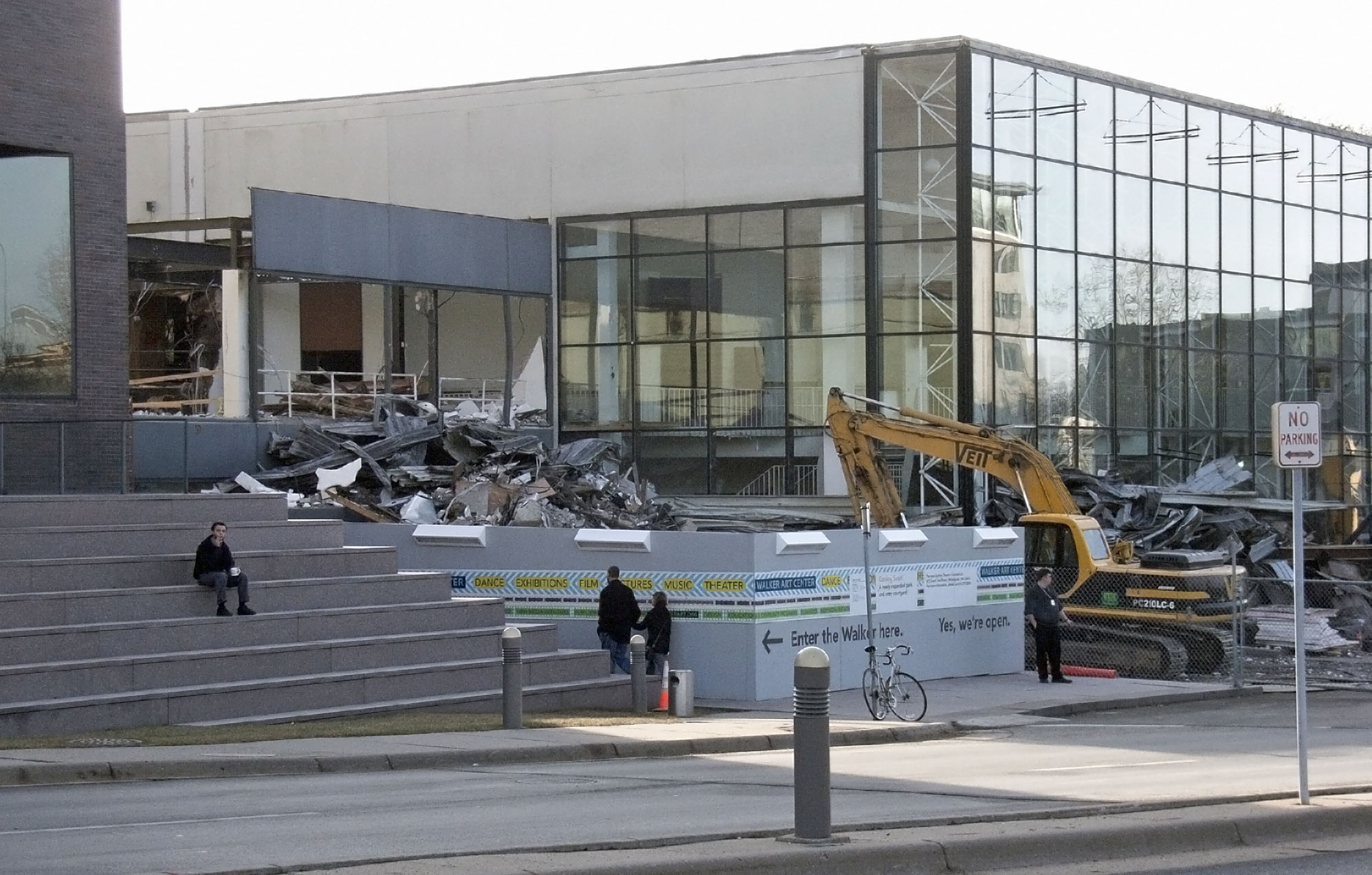
The Guthrie Theater on Vineland Place, during demolition in 2006. The original exterior screen had been removed in 1974.

Ralph Rapson was selected to design the 1963 theater building. Rapson was a leading contributor to architecture's modern movement on the East Coast from the late 1940s through the 1950s, and served as head of the University of Minnesota School of Architecture in the late 1950s. Rapson had also worked on some preliminary sketches of the Walker Art Center, which donated land on Vineland Place for the Guthrie's construction. Guthrie and Rapson selected a modified theater in the round design that featured a thrust stage projecting from a back wall with seating surrounding nearly two thirds of it.

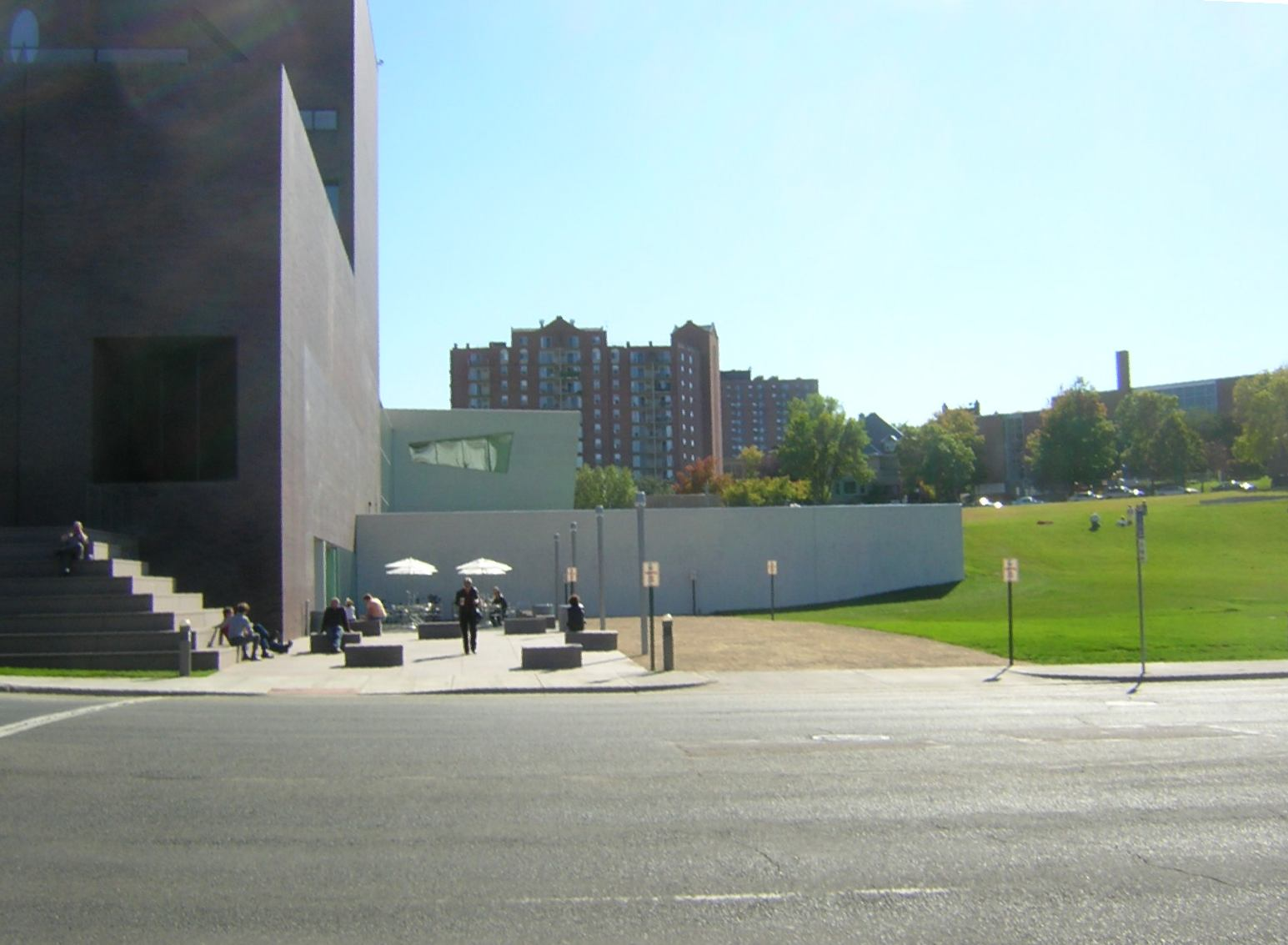
Walker Art Center site of the first Guthrie (green lawn at right in 2008)

The Guthrie's design arose out of Ralph Rapson's work with the Walker Art Center, and concepts the Walker was considering for a small auditorium near their museum. The result was a theater designed by Rapson, that seated 1,441 people when it first opened its doors in 1963. Its irregularly-shaped stage, designed by Tanya Moiseiwitsch, had 7 sides and took up 1120 square feet (104 m^{2}). Seating radiated outward and upward, and the ceiling was hung with acoustical panels that carried the asymmetrical theme to the top of the theater. The design concept encouraged the minimal use of large set pieces. In 1974 the distinctive exterior screen, which had suffered from corrosion by the elements over the years, was removed. In 1980, Artistic Director Liviu Ciulei redesigned the stage. The stage itself was modified so that its size, shape and height was adjustable, and he opened up the back wall to create more depth.

In 2002, the National Trust for Historic Preservation put the old Guthrie building on its list of the most endangered historic properties in the United States in response to plans announced by the Walker Art Center to expand on the land occupied by the theater. However, demolition started in late 2006 beginning with the common area between the old Guthrie building and the Walker. The site has been turned into green space and an extension of the Minneapolis Sculpture Garden.

== On the river ==
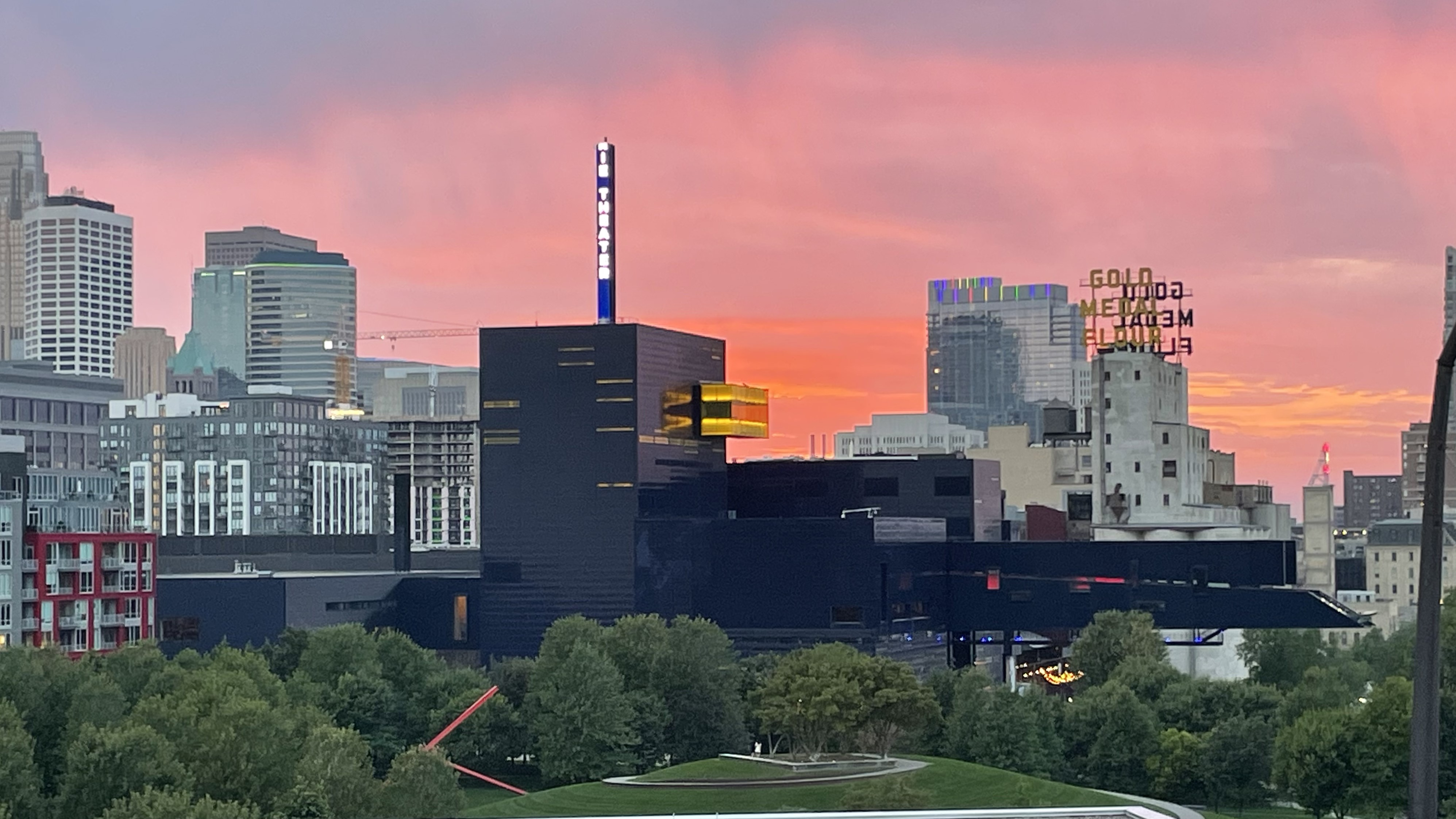
Guthrie Theater viewed from the east across Gold Medal Park at sunset, showing the scene shop at the left and the "Endless Bridge" cantilevering to the right.

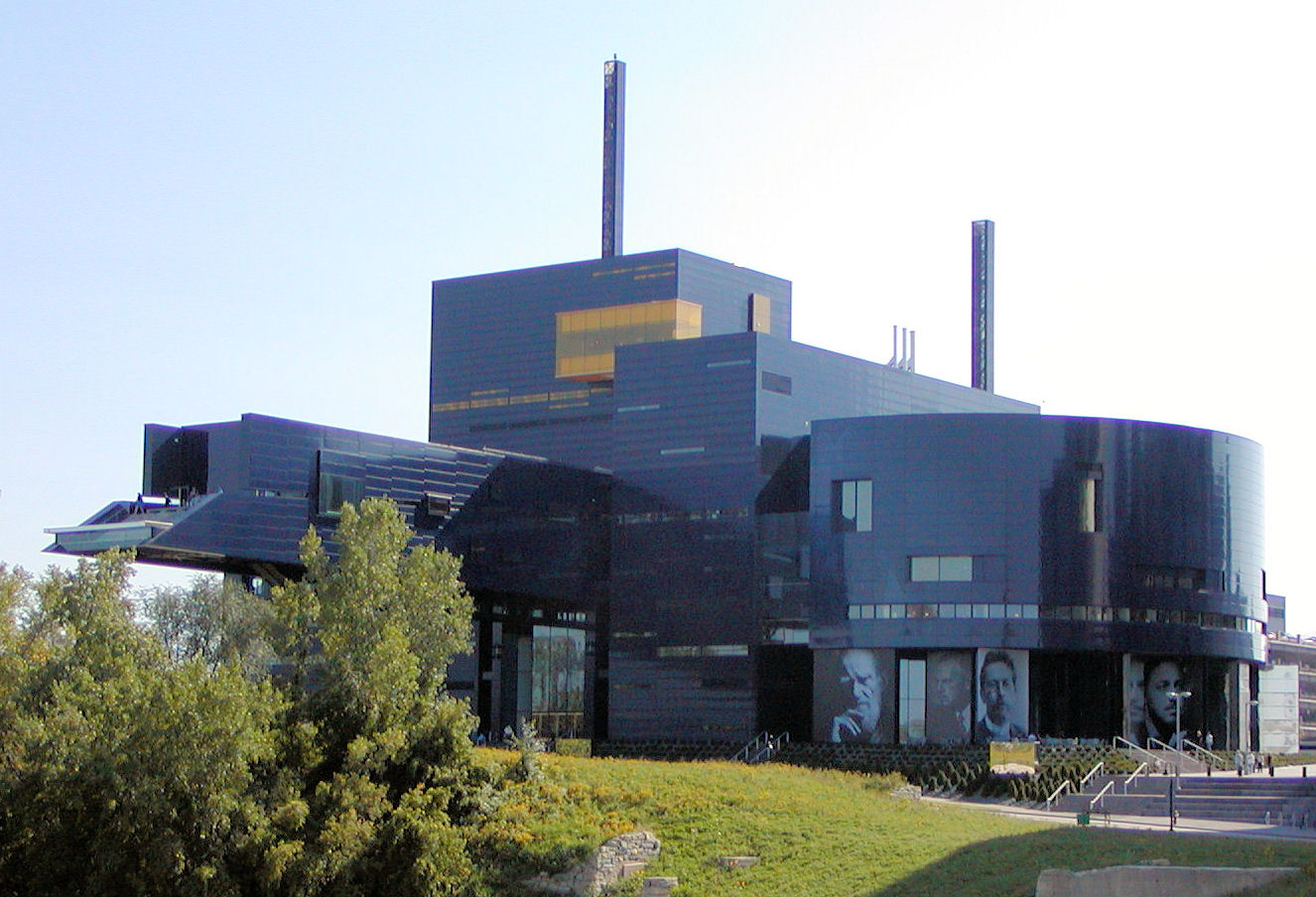
Guthrie Theater from the river side

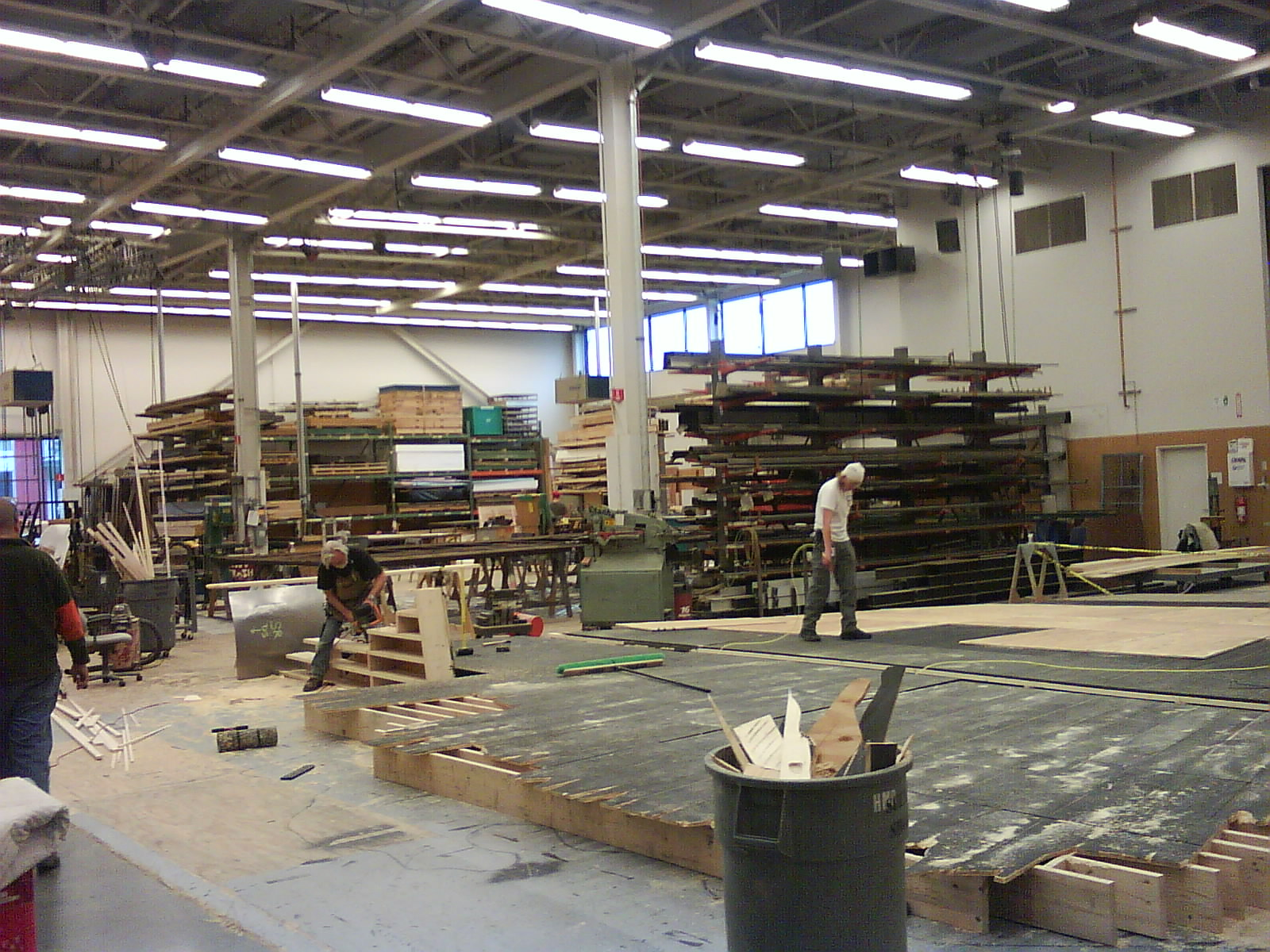
The set of 2009's Faith Healer under construction in the scene shop at the Guthrie

In 2006, the Guthrie finished construction of a new $125 million theater building along the Mississippi River in downtown Minneapolis. The design is the work of Jean Nouvel, along with the Minneapolis architectural firm Architectural Alliance and is a 285,000-square-foot (26,500 m^{2}) facility that houses three theaters: (1) the theater's signature thrust stage, seating 1,100, (2) a 700-seat proscenium stage, and (3) a black-box studio with flexible seating. It also has a 178-foot cantilevered bridge (called the "Endless Bridge") to the Mississippi which is open to visitors during normal building hours. The outside of the building's walls are covered in large panels which display a large mural of photographs from past plays visible clearly at night.

The first Guthrie production at the new location, The Great Gatsby (adapted for the stage by Simon Levy and directed by David Esbjornson), opened on July 15, 2006.

=== Auditoriums ===
- 1,100-seat Wurtele Thrust Stage
- 700-seat McGuire Proscenium Stage
- 199-seat Dowling Studio

=== Dining and retail ===
- Guthrie Store
- Indigena by Owamni

=== Public spaces ===
- Endless Bridge
- Target Lounge
- Theater lobbies on Levels Four, Five and Nine
- Street-level lobby on Level One

=== Semi-public spaces ===
- The Guthrie Learning Center – education classrooms
- Kitchak Lounge (donor lounge)

== Alternate stages ==
- Crawford Livingston Theater (1968–1969)
- The Other Place (1968–1971)
- Guthrie 2 (1976–1979)
- Guthrie Lab (1988–2005)

== Artistic directors ==
- Tyrone Guthrie (1963–1966)
- Douglas Campbell (1966–1967)
- Position vacant (1968–1970)
- Michael Langham (1971–1977)
- Alvin Epstein (1978–1980)
- Liviu Ciulei (1980–1985)
- Garland Wright (1986–1995)
- Joe Dowling (1995–2015)
- Joseph Haj (2015–present)

== 2024–2025 season ==
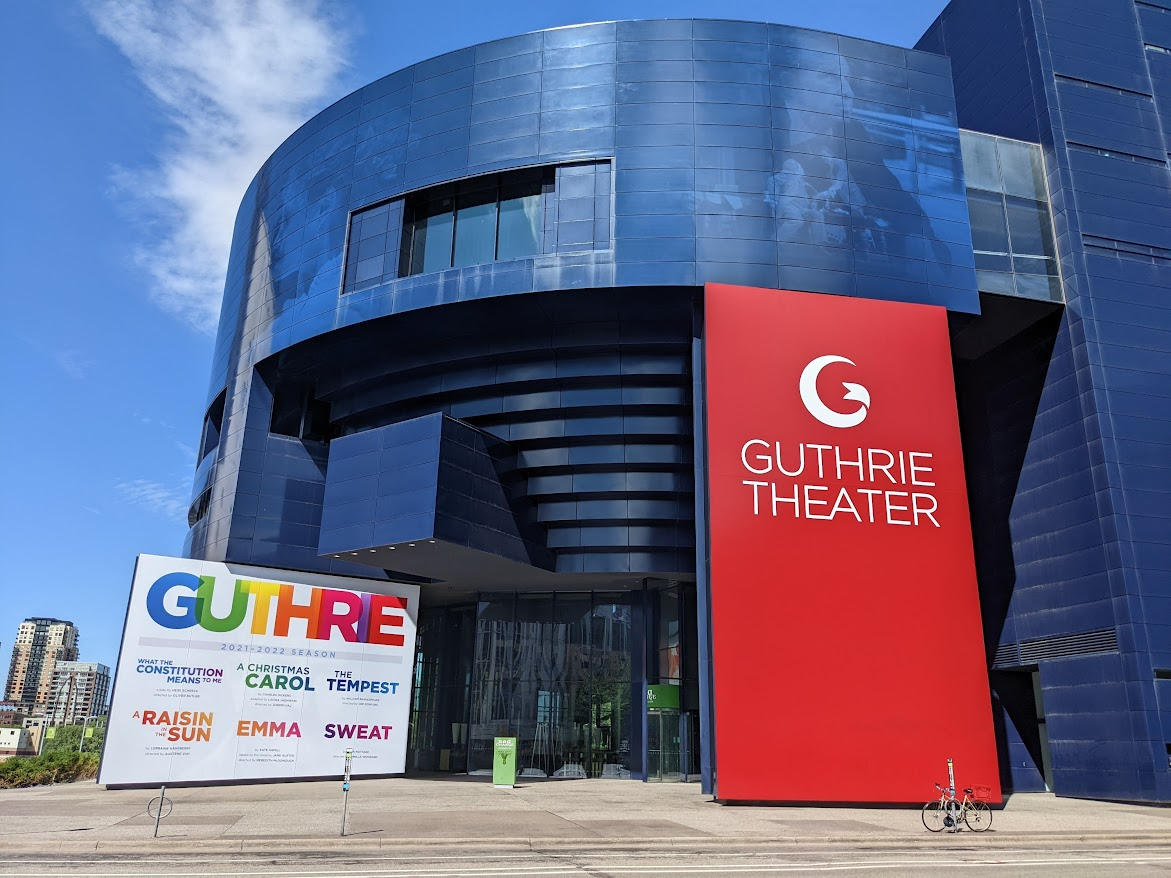
Entrance to the Guthrie Theater, with 2021–2022 season signage.

- The Lehman Trilogy – by Stefano Massini, adapted by Ben Power
- All the Devils Are Here: How Shakespeare Invented the Villain – by Patrick Page (an Octopus Theatricals production presented by the Guthrie Theater)
- A Christmas Carol – by Charles Dickens, adapted by Lavina Jadhwani
- The Heart Sellers – by Lloyd Suh
- A Midsummer Night's Dream – by William Shakespeare
- The Mousetrap – by Agatha Christie
- The Nacirema Society Requests the Honor of Your Presence at a Celebration of Their First One Hundred Years – by Pearl Cleage
- Cabaret – by John Kander, Fred Ebb, and Joe Masteroff, based on I Am a Camera by John Van Druten, which was based on Goodbye to Berlin by Christopher Isherwood

See Guthrie Theater production history for previous seasons.

== See also ==
- Gold Medal Park
- Tyrone Guthrie Centre, Ireland

== Further viewing ==
- "Guthrie Theater: Miracle in Minnesota". Guthrie Theater. 1963. Archived from the original on December 13, 2021.
- "Guthrie Theater: Our History". Guthrie Theater. 2017. Archived from the original on December 13, 2021.
