= Prehistoric man =

Prehistoric man may refer to:

- Human evolution
- The genus Homo
- Archaic humans
- Any perceivedly primitive culture
- The Prehistoric Man, a 1924 British silent comedy film
- Prehistoric Man, a 1957 nonfiction book by André Leroi-Gourhan

== See also ==
- Prehistorik Man, a 1995 video game
- The Prehistoric Man Museum, Israel
- Caveman
- Prehistory
- Paleolithic
- Cradle of Humankind (disambiguation)
