= Wrestling Jerusalem =

Wrestling Jerusalem is a one-person play and feature film exploring the Israeli–Palestinian conflict as well as wider themes about identity and social division. Devised and performed by actor Aaron Davidman, it features seventeen characters of widely different backgrounds and ideological viewpoints. A fundamental emotional theme of the drama is the connected nature of sudden life experiences, with the performer describing the influence of events such as the construction of the West Bank barrier wall and American anti-Zionist demonstrations. Multiple comparisons take place beyond social divisions; an example of such a blurred moment being the move from performing a Jewish song in Hebrew to the saying of an Islamic prayer. The drama premiered in 2014 at the Intersection for the Arts complex in San Francisco, California. The play was made into a feature film, directed by Dylan Kussman, and starring Mr. Davidman and premiered at the Castro Theatre in San Francisco as a featured film in the 2017 San Francisco Jewish Film Festival. It is streaming on Prime Video, APPLE TV+, GooglePlay and other platforms.

== Background and performances ==
Aaron Davidman is a Jewish-American actor who identifies as a socio-political "progressive", and he drew upon the occurrences during the many trips that he'd personally taken to Israel over the years. Wrestling Jerusalem takes inspiration from his attempt to emotionally comprehend the multiple perspectives that he's encountered, many of them filled with anxiety and sorrow about traumatic experiences. The Israeli–Palestinian conflict weighs heavily on the contents of the drama.

The one-person show features Davidman performing as a wide variety of individuals that vary in not just nationality but also age, occupation, religion, and other such classes, displaying highly contrasting viewpoints. The uncomfortable nature of Israeli security efforts, compared directly to features found in concentration camps, is explored as well as the horror of witnessing protesters yelling "Death to the Jews" in American anti-Zionist demonstrations. Life experiences between characters become blurred in several instances, such as when Davidman switches from performing a Jewish song in Hebrew to the saying of an Islamic prayer.

In one particular moment, the performer takes the role of an Israeli doctor commenting on the various sufferings that the character has witnessed. The doctor displays a disinterest in weighing what particular group of people has endured more, remarking that "I do not compare levels of trauma". Davidman declares, "It is irrelevant. Trauma is trauma."

The play had an 'Off Broadway' run in 2016. It was directed by Michael John Garcés, who had also overseen the drama's 2014 premier at the Intersection for the Arts complex in San Francisco, California. Its production team released a trailer for Wrestling Jerusalem on the video sharing website Vimeo.com that year as well, highlighting the play's lighting and use of music.

== Reviews ==
Wrestling Jerusalem has received a mixed yet supportive review from Laura Collins-Hughes of The New York Times. She labelled the production a "smartly written solo show" that "trusts in the power of the human voice and the capacity of the human heart." While stating that the characterization becomes "intensely frustrating", with the individuals profiled needing "far more room to breathe than they're allowed", she cited how the drama "believes that listening to one another's stories can change the way we move through the world."

The San Francisco Chronicle has published a laudatory review by Robert Hurwitt, who wrote:

"No answers are forthcoming. We could hardly expect any. Davidman's quest is rooted in the importance of listening to each other to seek understanding. His portraits are riveting, and the varieties of intransigence revealed are disturbing. But for anyone who's been paying attention, they're also painfully familiar."

== See also ==
- Israeli–Palestinian conflict
- Michael John Garcés
- One person show
