= Michael John Garcés =

Cuban-American playwright and director (born 1967)

Michael John Garcés (born 1967) is a Cuban-American playwright and director. He is the artistic director of Cornerstone Theater Company in Los Angeles. He has received several awards and grants, including the Alan Schneider Director Award and the Princess Grace Fellowship.

== Early life and education ==
Garcés was born in Miami, Florida, the son of Sergio, an accountant, and Lee, but grew up in Colombia. His family moved to Colombia when he was a young boy due to a job transfer for Sergio. His family lived in Medellín until he was 13 and it was in Medellín where Garcés was first exposed to political issues, like the wealth gap between the rich and poor, that would later be integrated into his work. It was also during his time living in Medellìn when Garcés first started doing theater, around the 5th or 6th grade. After living in Medellìn, his family moved to Bogotà, Colombia where he got a role as one of Jesus's apostles in a touring production of the musical Godspell, which received national attention because Godspell was one of the few American musicals to come to Colombia. This led him to the University of Miami where he received his BFA in theater.

== Career ==
After graduating from the University of Miami, Garcés moved to New York City in 1989 to pursue a career in theater. He quickly found an internship at INTAR, a Hispanic theater company, as a production assistant. This internship launched a career in theater in New York as an actor, director, and playwright that lasted for 16 years. Of his time in New York, Garcés says that much of his work was spent "focusing on my desire to learn about why one does this form, rather than why one does one's show." Garcés initially traveled to New York to work as an actor, but soon began writing his own pieces and directing the works of his peers after becoming frustrated with acting. Garcés worked for Max Ferrá at INTAR who not only encouraged Garcés to create an actors group, which became the NewWorks Lab, but also advised Garcés to pursue directing. After his time in New York, Garcés worked in a number of regional theaters across the country, including the Kentucky's Actors Theatre of Louisville and the Woolly Mammoth Theatre Company in Washington, D.C. During this time, he was honored with the Princess Grace Statue Award for distinguished accomplishment in the theater and the Alan Schneider Director Award and received a New Generations Grant from the Theater Communications Group. He also moved briefly to Chiapas, Mexico for an 8-week residency in a Mayan writers' collective where he directed one of the plays that was being performed. His time in Mexico greatly affected Garcés. He claims that "the impact, the quality of the aesthetic experience people were having watching the play, was so profound, so electric" and it was this experience which he believes led him to his current place of work, Cornerstone Theater Company.

Cornerstone Theater Company is a community-focused theater group in Los Angeles. Garcés describes it as "professional community theater," as professional playwrights, directors, and designers who are hired to work on specific shows go into and engage with the communities that the plays are about. Most of the plays written are fictitious, but are based on the stories told by the community members who are engaged by Cornerstone. Once a play is written, playwrights like Garcés will go back into the communities and do readings of the piece to hear feedback from community members. Garcés claims that Cornerstone is a theater that produces plays "about communities that are trying to define themselves" which is why community engagement is so necessary for the theater. Cornerstone is also a space that produces multiethnic pieces of theater, which allows Garcés to discuss issues relevant to the Latino population like Latino immigration and the status of undocumented immigrants in the United States.

The first script he wrote with Cornerstone Theater Company was the play Los Illegals, about the experience of immigrants from South and Central American attempting to cross the border between the United States and Mexico. Some of his inspiration for the piece came from experiences he's had interacting with undocumented immigrants. During the summers in between semesters while in college, Garcés would work with contractors in Queens, some of whom were undocumented Latino and Greek individuals. Garcés also interacted with undocumented agricultural workers while rehearsing a play he was producing in Florida later in his career before he came to Cornerstone. After coming to Cornerstone, Garcés was interested in exploring similar communities of undocumented immigrants in Los Angeles and began venturing out into the community to speak with individuals about their experiences, at places like Home Depot. He also spoke with individuals at the National Day Laborer Organizing Network to inform his piece. Garcés claims that the "heart of the story" is "about folks who were here and grappling with documentation, the legality or illegality of their residence, and their ability to work that." Though the piece is focused on the act of crossing the border, Garcés states that it is also about the inner conflict that undocumented immigrants experience once they arrive in the United States.

Garcés has been involved in various theater organizations in the United States, including The National Endowment for the Arts, New York State Council on the Arts, Colorado Council on the Arts, the City of Pasadena - Cultural Affairs Division, the Bush Foundation, the Mid-Atlantic Arts Foundation, Theatre Communications Group, NYFA, ART/NY, The Playwright's Center, the Andrew W. Mellon Foundation, Leveraging Investments in Creativity, The Drama League, the Spencer Cherashore Fund, the O'Neill Playwrights Conference, the Goethe Institute, New York Theatre Workshop, and New Dramatists.

== List of works ==
Director:

Urban Rez by Larissa FastHorse (Cornerstone Theater Company)

California: The Tempest adapted by Alison Carey (Cornerstone Theater Company)

Plumas Negras by Juliette Carrillo (Cornerstone Theater Company)

Café Vida by Lisa Loomer (Cornerstone Theater Company)

Three Truths by Naomi Iizuka (Cornerstone Theater Company)

Making Paradise: The West Hollywood Musical by Tom Jacobson (book), Shishir Kurup (lyrics) & Deborah Wicks La Pluma (music). Co-directed with Mark Valdez. (Cornerstone Theater Company)

atTraction by Page Leong (Cornerstone Theater Company)

Someday by Julie Marie Myatt (Cornerstone Theater Company)

The Falls by Jeffrey Hatcher (Cornerstone Theater Company & Guthrie Theater)

dark play, or stories for boys by Carlos Murillo (Actors Theatre of Louisville - Humana Festival)

Light Raise the Roof (New York Theatre Workshop)

Snapshot Silhouette (Children's Theatre, MN)

Breath, Boom by Kia Corthron (Huntington Theatre and Yale Repertory Theatre)

Kissing Fidel (INTAR)

The Cook (Hartford Stage and INTAR)

Havana is Waiting (The Cherry Lane)

Once Removed by Eduardo Machado (The Coconut Grove Playhouse)

The Dear Boy by Dan O'Brien

The Triple Happiness by Brooke Berman (Second Stage)

Lights Rise on Grace (Woolly Mammoth)

Recent Tragic Events by Craig Wright (Playwrights Horizons and Woolly Mammoth)

Finer Noble Gases by Adam Rapp

When the Sea Drowns in Sand by Eduardo Machado (ATL - Humana Festival)

Cradle of Man by Melanie Marnich (Florida Stage)

Finer Noble Gases (Rattlestick Playwrights Theatre)

La próxima parada by Carmen Rivera

La alquimia del deseo by Caridad Svich (Repertorio Español)

N.E. 2nd Avenue by Teo Castellanos (Edinburgh Fringe Festival - Fringe First Award; Prague Fringe Festival)

Young Valiant by Oliver Meyer

As Five Years Pass by Federico Garcia Lorca

Forever In My Heart by Oscar Colón (INTAR)

September Shoes by José Cruz Gonzales (Geva Theatre)

The Passion of Frida Kahlo by Dolores Sendler (The Directors Company/ ArcLight)

A Bicycle Country by Nilo Cruz

Praying with the Enemy by Luis Santeiro (Coconut Grove)

Mixtures by Nilaja Sun (New WORLD Theatre, Amherst, MA)

¡Siempre México con nosotros! in collaboration with Teatro Lo'il Maxil for Sna Jtz'ibajom ("The House of the Writer") in Chiapas, Mexico

Danza para la vida in collaboration with Teatro Lo'il Maxil for Sna Jtz'ibajom ("The House of the Writer") in Chiapas, Mexico

King Without a Castle by Cándido Tirado (Puerto Rican Traveling Theatre)

Book of Splendors, Part 1 by Richard Foreman (Nada - Foremanfest)

Playwright:

Plays:

Magic Fruit (Cornerstone Theater Company)

Los Illegals (Cornerstone Theater Company)

points of departure (INTAR)

Acts of Mercy (Rattlestick Playwrights Theatre)

suits (Twilight Theatre Company)

land. (juggerknot theatre co., Miami, FL)

customs, commissioned by the Mark Taper Forum and workshopped at INTAR (finalist, National Latino Playwright Award - Arizona Theatre Co.)

One-acts and Shorts:

on edge and the ride (2007 Humana Festival - "The Open Road")

audiovideo (Drama League Director's Project - "Directorfest 2005")

kapital (Estrogen Fest, Chicago)

Adelaide (The Production Company - "The Australia Project")

overexposed (Shalimar Productions - "A Thousand Words")

souvenirs (Vital Theatre Co. - "Vital Signs" )

now and then and jitters (La Mama)

sandlot ball (Mile Square Theatre - "7th Inning Stretch")

good to you, tell her that and The Delivery (Collaboraction, Chicago - "Summer Sketchbook")

frag, up for air, between visits, Punto Baldí, and deeper (American Living Room)

other: intrusions and harm's way (INTAR NewWorks Lab)

just the thought of someone and dirt (LAByrinth)

in our empty rooms (WBAI - Arts in the Evening Broadcast)

playing doctor (The 24 Hour Plays)

the woman ("24 is 10: The Best of the 24 Hour Plays" at the NYC Fringe Festival)

now and then is published in the anthology "Positive/Negative" (Aunt Lute Books, 2002)
