= Joe Dowling =

Irish theater director (born 1948)

Joe Dowling (born 27 September 1948) is an artistic director. He was artistic director for the Guthrie Theater in Minneapolis, Minnesota, United States. He is known for his work as artistic director of the Abbey Theatre in Ireland and his production involvement can be found in the Abbey Theatre archives. He has also directed plays in other theatres in Ireland as well as theatres in London, New York City, Washington D.C., Montreal, and Alberta. In 1975 he directed Katie Roche by Irish playwright Teresa Deevy.

== Education and career ==
Educated at the Catholic University School, Colaiste na Rinne and at University College Dublin, Dowling has been long connected with Irish theatre having founded the Gaiety School of Acting in Dublin in 1986, serving as artistic director of the Irish Theatre Company and the Peacock theatre and founding the Young Abbey. He directed a WB. yeats festival in 1990 at the Abbey and peacock theater (starring Yann Mc Mahon, Suzie Kennedy, Jon Olahan, Conner Mullan, other cast missing). Ireland's first theater-in-education group.

He became the Guthrie Theatre's artistic director in 1995 and has directed productions of A Midsummer Night's Dream, The Playboy of the Western World, Much Ado About Nothing, The Importance of Being Earnest, Julius Caesar, Twelfth Night, Romeo and Juliet, Macbeth and Amadeus.

He directed Hamlet, the Guthrie's last production in its original location next to the Walker Art Center in Minneapolis. Hamlet was also the first play produced by the Guthrie in 1963, directed by Sir Tyrone Guthrie himself.

Dowling's first production at the theater's new location was The Real Thing by Tom Stoppard.

As part of the 2007/2008 season, he directed the American premiere of The Home Place by Brian Friel and in the 2009/2010 season, he directed and performed in Friel's play Faith Healer.

Following the announcement of the 2012 Guthrie Theatre lineup, Dowling was criticized for the lack of diversity in the selection of directors and playwrights. In an interview with MPR, he said "this kind of drip drip drip of complaints about the Guthrie - I'm not certain that it's constructive."

In April 2014, Dowling announced that he would be retiring from the Guthrie Theater after the 2014/2015 season. Dowling was expected to direct productions of A Midsummer Night's Dream, The Crucible and finishing with Juno and the Paycock, which he had previously directed on Broadway in 1988.

== Playography ==
- Katie Roche (1975)

== See also ==
- Joseph Haj, artistic director of Guthrie
