= Joseph Haj =

American artistic director and actor

- Born: Paterson, New Jersey
- Education: University of North Carolina
- Occupation: Artistic director
- Awards: 2014 recipient of The Zelda Fichandler Award; Recipient of the NEA/White House Council Millennium Grant

Joseph Haj is an American artistic director and actor who is the eighth artistic director of the Guthrie Theater. Before joining the Guthrie, he worked at PlayMakers Repertory Company.

Haj has performed as an actor and was named by American Theatre magazine as one of 25 theater artists who will have a significant impact on the field over the next quarter century.

== Biography ==
Haj is the eighth artistic director of the Guthrie Theater in Minneapolis, Minnesota. Before succeeding Joe Dowling at Guthrie, he served as producing artistic director at PlayMakers Repertory Company, the theater in residence at the University of North Carolina at Chapel Hill, where he presented the world premiere of Surviving Twin by Loudon Wainwright III; commissioned and premiered Mike Daisey’s The Story of the Gun; commissioned and premiered UNIVERSES’ play Spring Training; and produced the premiere of The Parchman Hour by Mike Wiley. Under his leadership, PlayMakers hosted artist residencies or performances by David Edgar, Nilaja Sun, Taylor Mac, Lisa Kron, Rinde Eckert, SITI Company, Pig Iron, The TEAM, Rude Mechs, and others.

As a director, Haj has worked at theaters throughout the United States, including Oregon Shakespeare Festival, Actors Theatre of Louisville, and the Folger Theatre in Washington, D.C., and has directed projects in a maximum-security prison, in the West Bank and Gaza, and in rural South Carolina.

Upon receiving his M.F.A. from the University of North Carolina, Haj began working as an actor, performing with Garland Wright, JoAnne Akalaitis, Anne Bogart (as an original member of SITI Company), Peter Sellars, Sir Peter Hall, Robert Woodruff and others.

He was the 2014 recipient of The Zelda Fichandler Award, was named by American Theatre magazine as one of the 25 theater artists who will have a significant impact on the field over the next quarter century, and received the NEA/White House Council Millennium Grant awarded to 50 of America’s finest artists.
