= Live Action Set =

Live Action Set is a physical theater performance company based in Minneapolis, Minnesota.

Founded in 2003, their first standout production, Please Don't Blow Up Mr. Boban, was the top-selling show at the 2005 Minnesota Fringe Festival. In 2011, their original production about myths re-envisioned in the Old West, The 7-Shot Symphony, received an Ivey Award for Overall Excellence.

== Current leadership ==
Noah Bremer- Artistic Director
Joanna Harmon- Executive Director

== Founding company members ==
Noah Bremer
Megan Odell
Galen Treuer
Vanessa Voskuil

== Awards ==
2005 Artists of the Year (with director Jon Ferguson)
2005 Outstanding Experimental Theatre Work for Please Don't Blow Up Mr. Boban -Minneapolis Star Tribune
2006 Best Stage Production for Please Don't Blow Up Mr. Boban
2009 Best of Twin Cities Theater for My Father's Bookshelf
2011 Ivey, Overall Excellence for The 7-Shot Symphony

== Shows ==
1997-2001 Teletubbies
2003: Exposure
2004: Before Dark (review)
2005: Ice Cube; Storming of the Bastille; Hello Remember Me; Please Don't Blow Up Mr. Boban (review 1; review 2)
2006: Zombies on Ice; The Percussionist
2007: Desiderare: Desire the Undesirable
2008: The Piano Tuner; The Rite of Spring; Deviants
2009: My Father's Bookshelf
2010: The Happy Show, April 29-May 14 at the Bedlam Theatre, Minneapolis, MN; The Lord of the Rings in 9 Minutes, various locations, Minneapolis, MN
2011: The 7-Shot Shymphony, March 10–27 at The Loring Theater, Minneapolis, MN; July 15–24 at Strawdog Theatre, Chicago, IL; Fletcher and Zenobia Save the Circus, August 5–14 at Mill City Museum's train shed, Minnesota Fringe Festival, Minneapolis, MN
2012: The 7-Shot Shymphony, January TOUR (Miami, Sanibel, Ft. Myers, Louisville, Memphis); Kill Bill Treteau, various locations, Minneapolis, MN; Basic North, a performance in three intertwining directions, June 28-July 8 at The Southern Theater, Minneapolis, MN
