= Barbara Field =

American dramatist

Barbara Field (February 15, 1934 – February 21, 2021) was a playwright whose work has been seen at theaters across North America and Europe.

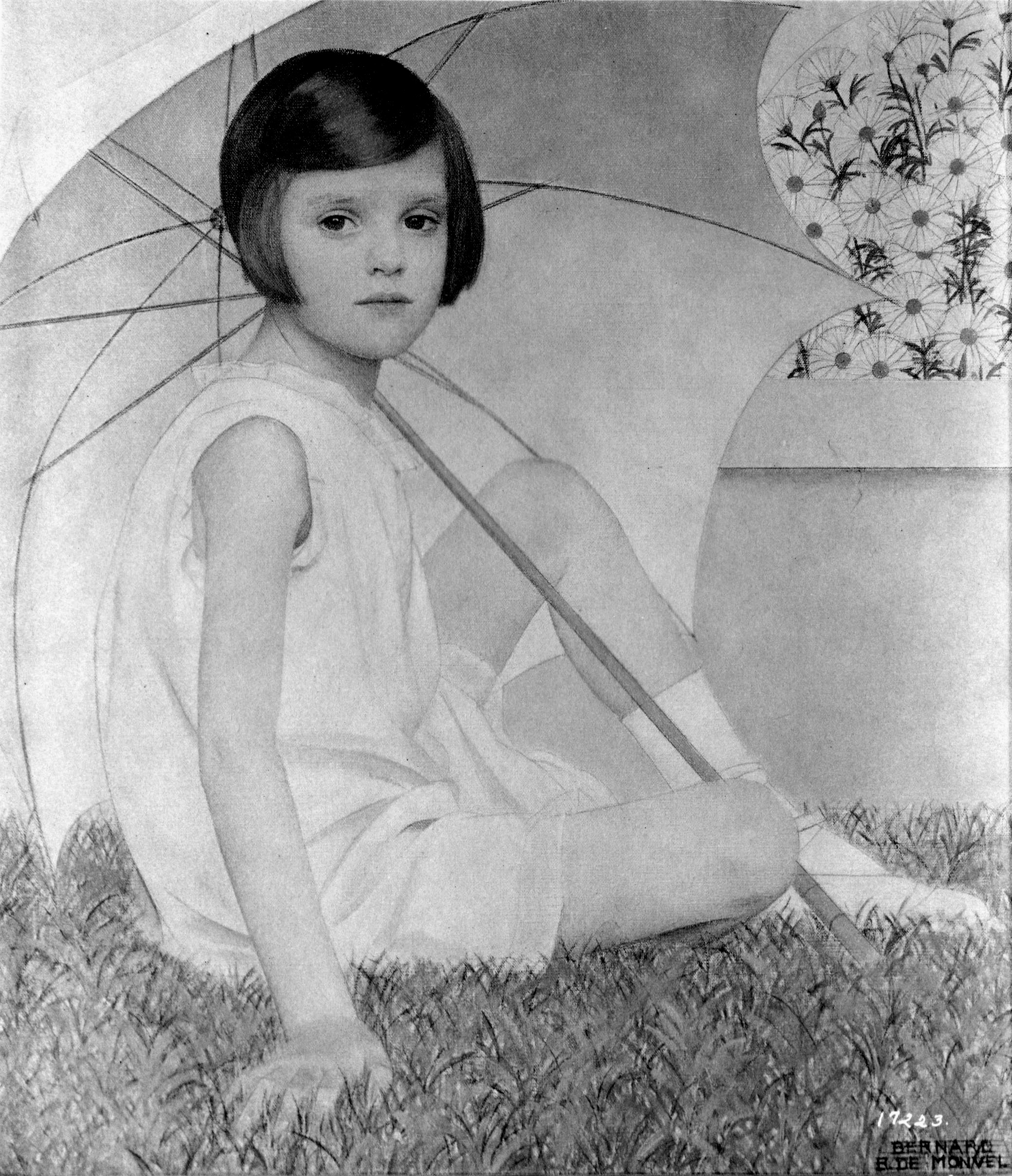
Portrait of Barbara Field by Boutet de Monvel

== Education ==
Field was a graduate of the University of Pennsylvania (BA) and the University of Minnesota (MA).

== Career ==
She wrote adaptations of such great works of literature as Great Expectations and A Christmas Carol, both by Charles Dickens, and of Scaramouche, by Rafael Sabatini. Great Expectations won the L.A. Drama critics award in 1996. Other plays include Neutral Countries, co-winner of the Humana Festival's Great American Play contest in 1983, and Boundary Waters, for which she received a DramaLogue Award in 1992. She also authored three books, New Classics from the Guthrie Stage(Smith and Kraus) and Barbara Field, Collected Plays, Vol I & II (Amazon).

Field was a co-founder of The Playwrights' Center and served as playwright-in-residence at the Guthrie Theater from 1974 to 1981.

== Honorable recognitions ==
She held fellowships from numerous organizations; the Shubert, Bush, McKnight, and Minnesota State Arts Board fellowships are among her many awards.

== Personal life ==
Field lived in Minneapolis. She died due to complications from a stroke on February 21, 2021 at the age of 87.
