= Cradle of Man =

Cradle of Man is a modern play by Melanie Marnich. It has been performed in Chicago and Dallas and stars David Eigenberg, Jennie Moreau, Peggy Roeder, Sean Cooper and Julie Ganey. It is set in Africa and deals with themes of lust, jealousy and the relationship with these primitive impulses. It also explores the idea of humanity.
