= History of Chinese Americans in Idaho =

The history of Chinese Americans in the US state of Idaho spans its history as both a territory and state. It began in the 1850s with the arrival of a group of miners from California. During the 1860s, a large number of Chinese immigrants, primarily working in the mining industry, arrived in the Idaho Territory, and according to the 1870 United States census, there were 4,274 Chinese people out of a total population of 14,999. In several mining communities, Chinese immigrants constituted a majority of the population. These immigrants faced discrimination from the majority white American population, which included legislation that targeted them for taxation and prohibited their involvement in certain industries, among other things. By the 1880s, there had been numerous incidents of violence against the Chinese, including multiple group killings and the expulsion of Chinese communities from several municipalities. Over the course of the 19th century, the population experienced sustained decline, reaching 859 by 1910 and further dropping to 208 by 1940. However, by the 2010s, the population had increased, due in large part to a growth in the Chinese American community in the Treasure Valley area. By 2018, there were approximately 5,000 Chinese Americans in Idaho, with a total Asian American population of roughly 25,000.

== Background ==
Idaho in the United States

Humans first arrived in the area of modern-day Idaho approximately 11,000 years Before Present. By the beginning of the 19th century, there were several groups of indigenous peoples of the Americas living permanently in the region, with others living in the area on a nomadic basis. The first white people arrived in the area in the early 19th century, with members of the Lewis and Clark Expedition reaching the area in 1805. Permanent white American settlement began around 1810 as part of the North American fur trade. In addition to the fur trade, some subsequent settlement efforts stemmed from Christian mission efforts to convert the Native Americans in the area. In 1863, the Idaho Territory was organized as a territory of the United States. Idaho became a U.S. state in 1890.

== History ==
=== Arrival of Chinese immigrants in Idaho ===
In 1856, a small group of Chinese miners from Fresno, California, traveled north into the Rocky Mountains, reaching the drainage basin of the Boise River in modern-day southern Idaho. In 1859, another mining group visited the basin. In 1860, gold was discovered in modern-day Pierce, Idaho, with additional discoveries made around the same time in other parts of the region, including Idaho City and Warren. This prompted an influx of several thousand miners into the region, including both white people and Chinese immigrants. In 1862, when gold was discovered in the watershed of the Boise River, Chinese people were among the first to begin mining in the area. That same year, a Chinese person was recorded for the first time in the area around Lewiston. While Chinese people initially settled in the northern part of the territory, by 1865, several had settled the southern part as well, including the Owyhee Mountains region.

The Chinese immigration to Idaho was part of a larger trend of Chinese immigration to the Pacific Northwest that occurred during the 1860s. Per historian Carlos A. Schwantes, reasons for the increase in emigration from China during this time included famines, overpopulation, and the impact of the Taiping Rebellion, which lasted from 1850 to 1864. Among all Asian American groups living in the region during this time, Chinese Americans were the most populous. The largest job sectors for Chinese immigrants during this time included mining and railroad construction. Concerning the former, the Chinese workers often mined in areas that had already been mined by white workers, working in large teams to extract resources that had been passed over in previous mining efforts. By 1870, over half of the miners in Idaho were Chinese. Chinese mining communities emerged that included the establishment of medical facilities and gardens to aid the miners. According to Idahoan historian Arthur Hart, some of the Chinese immigrants in Idaho had previously been farmers in the Pearl River Delta who continued to practice agriculture in the United States. Concerning the railroad industry, Chinese laborers in Idaho worked on the construction of the Northern Pacific Railway. Other common jobs during this time included the operation of laundries, restaurants, and shops.

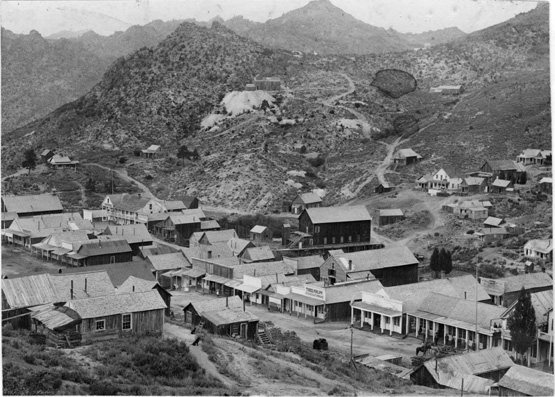
Silver City (pictured 1892) had a Chinese population of about 700 in 1874.

In the 1870 United States census, Idaho was shown to have a population of 14,999, of which 4,274 were Chinese. (Note: These values are given in several sources. However, in a 2007 book, academic Robert T. Hayashi stated that, in 1870, Idaho had a non-Native American population of 17,804, of which 4,724 were Chinese.) As a percentage of the population, Chinese people represented approximately 28 percent, with white people accounting for about 71 percent. (Note: In a 2009 article from the Associated Press published in the Northwest Asian Weekly, historical archaeologist Priscilla Wegars of Moscow, Idaho, said that the actual percentage of the population that was Chinese was probably higher, as she believed that Chinese people had been undercounted.) This Chinese population was largely male, as very few women immigrated to the United States during this time, with the 1870 census recording only 129 Chinese women in the territory. Initially, Chinese immigrants were restricted to living in Chinatowns throughout the state, such as in Boise, Lewiston, and Salmon. Boise's Chinatown was centered in the city's Downtown area, while another local area of Chinese settlement was centered in present-day Garden City. By the 1870s, Lewiston's Chinatown, located near the confluence of the Clearwater River and Snake River, had a population of about 1,500 Chinese people. Several mining communities, including Centerville, Idaho City, Pioneerville, and Placerville, had Chinese-majority populations. In 1879, Warren had a Chinese population of about 800, compared to a white population of about 200. Chinese communities often operated their own cemeteries and made arrangements for the eventual exhumation of corpses back to China. In Silver City, which had a Chinese population of about 700 in 1874, the community operated several laundries, restaurants, and stores, as well as a Masonic lodge, two temples, and five gambling houses.

=== Anti-Chinese sentiment and legislation ===
During the 19th century, Chinese immigrants in Idaho, as in other parts of the country, were subject to anti-Chinese sentiment by white Americans. Chinese immigrants were barred from naturalizing and gaining American citizenship, and there were restrictions on purchasing land. Violence against Chinese people was also common in Idaho, with Hart stating in 2020 that murder victims in Idaho during the 1860s "were often Chinese". Reflecting the anti-Chinese sentiment that was common at the time, journalist James O'Meara, as the editor of the Idaho World newspaper in Idaho City, wrote in 1865, "The Chinamen are coming. Lord deliver us from the locusts of Egypt, they devour all men before them." Similarly, an 1868 article in the Idaho Tri-Weekly Statesman stated, "The influx of Chinamen continues unabated to the great disgust of the American miners generally". Anti-Chinese sentiment was further reflected in the common names given to local plants and geographic features. For instance, Lactuca serriola was commonly called "Chinese lettuce", while a mountain near Pocatello was called "Chink's Peak". (Note: In 2001, the United States Board on Geographic Names renamed this mountain to "Chinese Peak".) In 1891, a city directory of Boise listed the "Anti-Chinese Hotel" as a hotel in operation at the time.

Initially, Chinese residents of the territory were barred from owning mining claims. However, by 1865, many of these claims had been exhausted of the easily accessible gold, and white claim-owners began selling or leasing them to Chinese miners to fund mining activity elsewhere. For instance, Chinese miners were initially not allowed in Warren after gold was discovered there in 1862. However, after many of the claims in the area had been mined for several years, the community voted to allow Chinese miners into the area in 1869. In 1867, the territorial government of Idaho passed an anti-miscegenation law barring white people from marrying, among other groups, "Mongolians". In 1906, after gaining statehood, Idaho enacted an anti-miscegenation law specifically prohibiting marriage between Chinese and white people. This law would be in force until 1967, when the Supreme Court of the United States ruled that anti-miscegenation laws were unconstitutional.

==== Foreign Miners' Tax ====
In 1864, (Note: This year is given in a 2000 book on Idaho history, while a 2009 report from the Associated Press states that the law was introduced during the 1864–1865 legislative session. However, in a 1996 book, historian Carlos A. Schwantes states that the law was passed in 1866.) the Idaho government passed a Foreign Miners' Tax, also known as the "China Tax", which specifically targeted Chinese miners in the territory. The law had been proposed by Idaho House of Representatives member William Goulder, a miner from Shoshone County, and was modeled after similar taxes that targeted Chinese individuals that had been passed in other states and territories of the Western United States, such as California (1852) and the Washington Territory (1864). Per the Idaho law, each Chinese miner would have had to pay several dollars to the territorial government. (Note: Sources vary on the exact amount that would have been collected as part of the law. In a 2009 article published in the Northwest Asian Weekly, Associated Press reporter Jennifer K. Bauer said that Chinese miners would have had to pay $6 ($124 in 2025). However, in a 1996 book on Idaho history, historian Carlos A. Schwantes said that the law, which was passed in 1866, would apply a monthly tax of $5 ($110 in 2025). Meanwhile, a 2019 book states that the tax was $4 ($82 in 2025). In a 2014 article, historian Priscilla Wegars gave a range of between $4 and $5 per month.) The law additionally classified all Chinese individuals in the territory as miners and allowed for local sheriffs to seize and auction property if the tax were not paid. The Chinese community in Idaho opposed the law and challenged its constitutionality in court, though ultimately failed in having it voided. However, many refused to pay, and per historians John Mack Faragher and Robert V. Hine, there is no evidence that any Chinese person was prosecuted for tax evasion. Ultimately, the "China Tax" was declared void by the Enforcement Act of 1870. (Note: This information comes from a 2000 book by historians John Mack Faragher and Robert V. Hine. However, the text is ambiguous as to whether the 1870 law only voided the California version of the tax or all versions of the "China Tax", including the one in Idaho.)

==== Chinese Exclusion Act and later actions ====
In 1882, the federal government of the United States enacted the Chinese Exclusion Act. The act barred Chinese immigration to the United States until 1892 and placed further restrictions on Chinese individuals already in the country, barring them from working in certain industries (such as mining) and preventing them from gaining citizenship. Anti-Chinese legislation during this time further diminished the ability of Chinese individuals who had returned to China from reentering the United States or from bringing their spouses with them. This anti-Chinese legislation was supported by white labor unions, such as the regional Knights of Labor. By the time the Exclusion Act had passed, the Chinese population in Idaho had already decreased by about 1,000 compared to its peak. The Chinese Exclusion Act was subsequently renewed in 1892 and later in 1902. When Idaho became a state in 1890, its constitution specifically barred "Chinese or persons of Mongolian descent, not born in the United States" from holding elected offices, participating in juries, or from voting. That same year, the state passed a constitutional amendment barring noncitizens from employment in public works projects, which specifically targeted Asian people. At the time, the Chinese population was over 2,000.

=== Acts of violence and expulsions ===
In the 1880s, there were several instances when Chinese people were violently expelled from locales. For instance, in the Washington Territory, the Knights of Labor led expulsions in several coal towns in the Cascade Range and in Tacoma, where the Chinese community numbered about 700, or one-tenth of the city's total population. Additional incidents of anti-Chinese violence occurred in Idaho during this time. In 1883, a conflagration affected Lewiston's Chinatown, with firefighters only intervening when the fire threatened buildings outside of that community. In an 1884 editorial in the Coeur d'Alene Sun, the newspaper stated that any Chinese miner who wished to come to the Idaho panhandle should prepare for a funeral, insinuating their death. Per Schwantes, Idaho during the mid-1880s experienced numerous instances of anti-Chinese violence, with no individuals punished for the acts. This included an incident in Pierce where five Chinese individuals were lynched by vigilantes who believed that they had murdered a white businessman. This occurred in September 1885. In December 1885, the Idaho Statesman newspaper published an article that spoke favorably of a then-ongoing effort in Boise to not hire Chinese people and to boycott businesses that did.

Around that time, a large anti-Chinese convention was taking place in Boise, which coincided with an increase in anti-Chinese violence in the territory. A similar convention was held in February 1886 in Weiser that included a call to action "to rid our yet unsullied community of the few lecherous, uncivilized heathens who now infest it, and to prevent their further encroachment upon us". In June 1886, someone detonated an explosive underneath a Chinese laundry in Broadford, which destroyed the building and injured an employee. Around the same time, a white mob attacked the Chinese community in Clark Fork by throwing bombs at the structures. In September 1886, both the Idaho Democratic Party and the Idaho Republican Party adopted anti-Chinese planks into their platform. In May 1887, over thirty Chinese individuals were massacred in Hells Canyon, near the Idaho border in Oregon. These individuals had been traveling upriver from Lewiston at the time of their killing. That same month, a week-long riot occurred in Salmon that saw white people attack the Chinese community there.

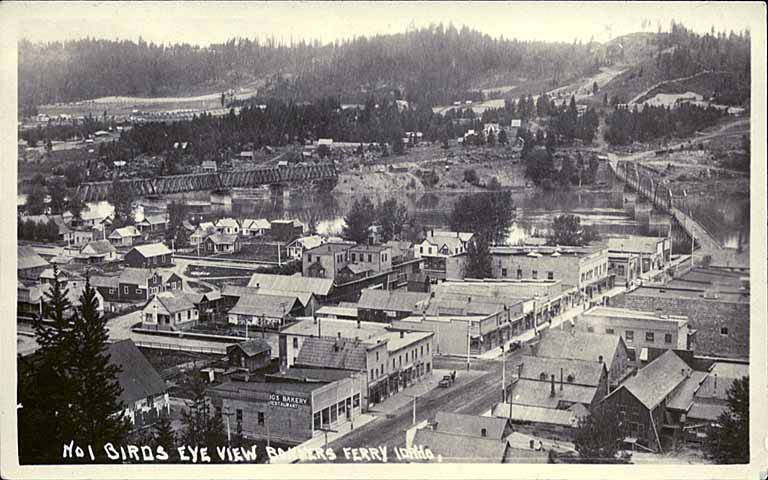
In 1892, white residents of Bonners Ferry (pictured c. 1915) expelled the municipality's Chinese population.

In 1891, white residents of Clark Fork forcibly expelled the city's Chinese population. A similar expulsion occurred the following year in Bonners Ferry. During the 1890s, the Chinese population in the region declined, coinciding with an increase in the Japanese population, with both groups facing anti-Asian discrimination and violence. In 1892, Japanese railway workers were expelled from Caldwell, Mountain Home, and Nampa. In Caldwell and Nampa, some Chinese individuals were forcibly expelled alongside the Japanese workers. In 1909, the Chinese population of Moscow was expelled from the city. (Note: The year of 1909 is given in a 2019 book discussing the history of Idaho. However, in a 2021 article published by KUNC, Idahoan historian Priscilla Wegars said that the expulsion probably occurred between 1904 and 1909.) According to a 2021 article published by KUNC, following this expulsion, Moscow was likely a sundown town. In 1983, a resident of Moscow who was a child during the expulsion said that she had received some of the possessions of the expelled, including several dishes. Chinese Americans would not live in Moscow again until about 20 years later. Prohibitions against Chinese residency also existed in Twin Falls and Wallace.

According to historian Liping Zhu, between 1863 and 1900, 25 Chinese people were killed in anti-Chinese riots in Idaho. Furthermore, these riots resulted in the displacement of 528 Chinese people. Per Zhu, the riots primarily took place in central and northern Idaho, and none are recorded as having happened in the Boise River basin.

=== 20th century ===
Chinese population of Idaho, 1870–1940
Year	Population	Notes
1870	4,274	
1880	3,379	
1890	2,007	
1900	1,467	
1910	859	
1940	208	

By 1910, the Chinese population in the state had decreased to 859. By this time, a majority of the Chinese immigrants who had come to Idaho in the 19th century had returned to China. By 1920, the state's Chinese population constituted about 0.5 percent of the total population, which was nearly 99 percent white. By 1940, there were only 208 Chinese people in the state. In the 1960s and 1970s, urban renewal in Boise resulted in the demolishment of much of the city's Chinatown. This included a brick building that had been built in the early 1900s for the Hip Sing Association, which was demolished in 1971. In 1989, archaeological excavations were undertaken on a Chinese mining area along in the Snake River Canyon near Twin Falls. Around 1990, a historical marker was erected near the site of the 1885 Pierce City lynching.

=== 21st century ===
==== Growth in population ====
The 2010s saw a growth in Idaho's Asian American population, and by 2018, there were roughly 5,000 Chinese Americans living in the state, with a total Asian American population of about 25,000. Of the Chinese Americans in Idaho, about half lived in the Treasure Valley region. Per the Idaho Statesman, the Chinese American growth in the region could be partially attributed to the increase in job opportunities from employers such as Boise State University, Hewlett-Packard, and Micron Technology. In 2018, the Statesman published an article discussing plans for the creation of an Asian supermarket in Boise. By 2020, the Boise Chinese Association, which was formed to celebrate Chinese culture in the area, had over 400 members.

In 2010, the Idaho Chinese Organization was founded in order to bring attention to Chinese culture and history in the state. In February 2016, the organization organized a march of over 100 people in Boise in support of Peter Liang, an officer in the New York City Police Department who had recently been convicted of manslaughter in the killing of Akai Gurley, an unarmed African American. The march went from the Idaho Black History Museum to the Idaho State Capitol, where a rally took place that included the participation of State Representative Sue Chew. On August 10, 2021, the Idaho Chinese Organization organized a "Polly Bemis Day" celebration at the Idaho State Capitol to celebrate Polly Bemis, a Chinese pioneer of Idaho. The celebration included the unveiling of a state of Bemis on the steps of the capitol, with plans for the sculpture to later be permanently installed near the Polly Bemis House. The event was attended by about 100 people and included the participation of several prominent members of the state's Asian American community, including State Representative Chew and Boise chief of police Ryan Lee.

==== Recognition of Chinese American history ====
Beginning in 2008, an annual conference called "Chinese Remembering" has been held in Lewiston to discuss Chinese history in the area. In reporting on the 2009 conference, Jennifer K. Bauer of the Associated Press said that Chinese history in the state was "not well known" at the time, but that awareness was increasing in the region. The conferences also served as memorials for the 1887 massacre in Hells Canyon, which occurred near Lewiston. During the 2012 conference, a granite memorial was installed at the site of the killings. The memorial was created by a company in Lewiston and contained a brief description of the massacre in three languages: Chinese, English, and Nez Perce.

In 2014, historian Priscilla Wegars noted that the state had taken some steps in recognizing its Chinese residents, noting the restoration and preservation of several historic houses and shops owned by Chinese residents. In July 2018, Idaho Public Television aired an episode of its Idaho Experience program dedicated to the history of Chinese immigrants in the state, titled "Forgotten Neighbors: Idaho's Chinese Immigrants". Concerning the episode, series producer Melissa Davlin said, "Not many Idahoans know the history of Chinese workers in our state. This episode doesn't just tell their stories. It also explores what it means to be an Idahoan and who gets to define what 'Idahoan' means." In 2022, Boise State Public Radio reported that there was a growing push to recognize the state's Chinese American history. That same year, the Idaho Museum of Mining and Geology in Boise announced the celebration of an exhibit dedicated to the history of Chinese miners in the state. In the 2020s, author Jenny Tinghui Zhang published her debut novel, Four Treasures of the Sky, which dealt with Chinese history in Idaho during the late 19th century. Zhang discussed the historical context of her book with a state historian in an interview with Boise State Public Radio.

== Historic sites ==
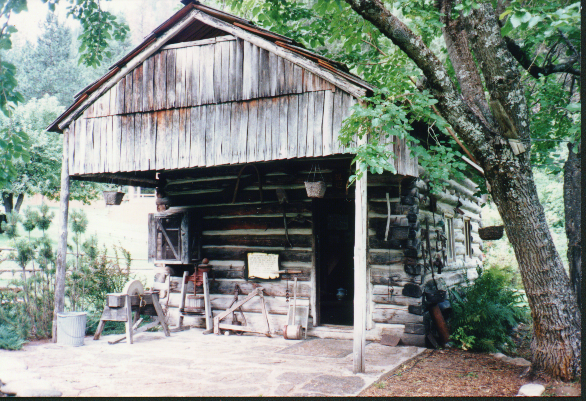
The Polly Bemis House in 1994

In 2014, Wegars noted that there were several sites of historic significances to the Chinese American community in Idaho, which included the Pon Yam House in Idaho City and the Polly Bemis House near the Salmon River. The former was a preserved store operated by a Chinese businessman during the late 19th century. The latter, located about 44 miles (71 kilometers) east of Riggins, was the residence of Chinese pioneer Polly Bemis. As of at least 2021, the site is on the National Register of Historic Places (NRHP). Another NRHP property associated with the Chinese history of the state is a terraced garden in the Payette National Forest. Additionally, a memorial exists in Glenns Ferry that honors the contributions of the state's Chinese American community. In 2020, it was rededicated. In the late 19th century, many Chinese immigrants began to farm the area that is now Garden City in the Boise metropolitan area. Due to this, a major thoroughfare in the city is called "Chinden Boulevard", as a contraction of "Chinese garden".

== Boise tunnels urban legend ==
In Boise, there is an urban legend that Chinese residents in the late 19th century created a tunnel system underneath the city, similar to the Shanghai tunnels in Portland, Oregon. Per the legend, the tunnels were located around Boise's Chinatown, centered around the present site of The Egyptian Theatre, and were used to travel between opium dens. However, there is no evidence for the existence of these alleged tunnels. Fictional accounts of the tunnels have been reported in several Boise publications, such as in a 1981 Halloween story in the Idaho Statesman and in a 2002 April Fools' Day story in the Boise Weekly. In 2017, the Idaho State Historical Society uncovered a video recording of a journalist interviewing individuals about the tunnels.

== Notable people ==
- Polly Bemis – Pioneer who lived in Idaho during the late 19th and early 20th century.
- Sue Chew – Politician and member of the Idaho House of Representatives.

== Sources ==
- Armitage, Sue (2015). Shaping the Public Good: Women Making History in the Pacific Northwest. Corvallis, Oregon: Oregon State University Press. ISBN 978-0-87071-816-8. LCCN 2015030645. OCLC 929120690.
- Barnhill, Frankie (July 30, 2020). "Why Idaho's Racist History Matters: Part 1". Idaho Matters. Boise State Public Radio. Archived from the original on May 1, 2021.
- Bauer, Jennifer K. (July 23, 2009). "Historians track Chinese history in Idaho". Northwest Asian Weekly. Vol. 28, no. 31. Seattle. Associated Press. Archived from the original on November 24, 2009.
- "Restored Memorial Honors Chinese Railroad Workers in Idaho". Boise State Public Radio. June 10, 2020. Archived from the original on April 22, 2021.
- "City Club of Boise - A Chinese Story in Idaho with Jenny Tinghui Zhang". City Club of Boise. Boise State Public Radio. March 8, 2024. Archived from the original on March 8, 2024.
- Day, Don (August 17, 2014). "I Wonder: Are there secret tunnels under downtown Boise?". KTVB. Archived from the original on March 26, 2021.
- Dirlik, Arif; Yeung, Malcolm, eds. (2001). "Appendix". Chinese on the American Frontier. Pacific Formations: Global Relations in Asian and Pacific Perspectives. Lanham, Maryland: Rowman & Littlefield. pp. 449–471. ISBN 978-0-8476-8532-5. OCLC 44019568.
- Edmunson, Clete (April 18, 2013). "Historic Warren, Idaho". The Blue Review. Boise State University School of Public Service. Archived from the original on July 25, 2013.
- Elsensohn, M. Alfreda (2001). "Polly Bemis, Legendary Heroine". In Dirlik, Arif; Yeung, Malcolm (eds.). Chinese on the American Frontier. Pacific Formations: Global Relations in Asian and Pacific Perspectives. Lanham, Maryland: Rowman & Littlefield. pp. 253–257. ISBN 978-0-8476-8532-5. OCLC 44019568.
- Fisher, George (2024). Beware Euphoria: The Moral Roots and Racial Myths of America's War on Drugs. New York City: Oxford University Press. ISBN 978-0-19-768848-9. LCCN 2023030162. OCLC 1401671495.
- Haltinner, Kristin; Keleher, Leanna; Hoffman, Annysia (2019). "Idaho". In Reid-Merritt, Patricia (ed.). A State-by-State History of Race and Racism in the United States. Vol. I. Santa Barbara, California: Greenwood Publishing Group. pp. 244–261. ISBN 978-1-4408-5601-3. OCLC 1035805500.
- Hart, Arthur (April 23, 2016). "History of Idaho hotels includes those planned but never built". Idaho Statesman. McClatchy. ISSN 2688-884X. OCLC 50144804.
- Hart, Arthur (April 15, 2017). "Japanese workers instrumental in building of Northwest railroads". Idaho Statesman. McClatchy. ISSN 2688-884X. OCLC 50144804.
- Hart, Arthur (August 13, 2020) [August 1, 2020]. "The 19th century Idaho frontier was full of murder, with Chinese victims commonplace". Idaho Statesman. McClatchy. ISSN 2688-884X. OCLC 50144804.
- Hayashi, Robert T. (2007). Haunted by Waters: A Journey Through Race and Place in the American West. American Land and Life Series. Foreword by Wayne Franklin. Iowa City, Iowa: University of Iowa Press. ISBN 978-1-58729-722-9. LCCN 2007923928. OCLC 294901760.
- Hine, Robert V.; Faragher, John Mack (2000). The American West: A New Interpretive History. New Haven, Connecticut: Yale University Press. ISBN 978-0-300-07833-6. OCLC 42072271.
- History of Idaho Territory. Fairfield, Washington: Ye Galleon Press. 1973 [1884]. ISBN 978-0-87770-119-4. OCLC 640898.
- "Mark your TV calendars: 'Idaho Experience' explores stories, legacy of Chinese immigrants". The Idaho Press. July 23, 2018. Archived from the original on July 19, 2018.
- "Boise's Chinese community plans march, rally at Idaho Capitol Saturday". Idaho Statesman. McClatchy. February 19, 2016a. ISSN 2688-884X. OCLC 50144804.
- "Boise Chinese organization rallies in support of NYPD officer". Idaho Statesman. McClatchy. February 21, 2016b [February 20, 2016]. ISSN 2688-884X. OCLC 50144804.
- James, Ronald L. (October 1995). Lytle, John C. (ed.). Ruins of a World: Chinese Gold Mining at the Mon-Tung Site in the Snake River Canyon. Idaho Cultural Resource Series No. IV. Bureau of Land Management.
- Just, Rick (December 9, 2021). "Rick Just's History Corner: Underground tunnels". Boise Weekly. Archived from the original on November 10, 2025.
- "Chinese American pioneer Polly Bemis honored at Idaho Capitol". KTVB. August 11, 2021a. Archived from the original on August 17, 2021.
- "Statehouse event highlights Polly Bemis, Idaho's most well-known Chinese American pioneer". KTVB. August 11, 2021b. Archived from the original on August 17, 2021.
- "The history behind Garden City's Chinese gardens". KTVB. December 5, 2024. Archived from the original on November 10, 2025.
- Kwong, Peter; Miščevič, Dušanka (2005). Chinese America: The Untold Story of America's Oldest New Community. New York City: The New Press. ISBN 978-1-56584-962-4. LCCN 2005049550. OCLC 60420916.
- La Ganga, Maria L. (May 11, 2018) [May 4, 2018]. "An old film from the 1960s could help solve a Boise mystery about tunnels under the city". Idaho Statesman. McClatchy. ISSN 2688-884X. OCLC 50144804.
- Luke, Bettie (July 13, 2012). "Commentary: Sending pebbles — Memories of the Chinese Remembrance Memorial dedication". Northwest Asian Weekly. Vol. 31, no. 29. Seattle. Archived from the original on April 20, 2013.
- Matsuzawa, Shirah (May 30, 2023). "Celebrating AAPI Heritage Month: Idaho Rep. Sue Chew". KTVB. Archived from the original on May 31, 2023.
- McCunn, Ruthanne Lum (2014). "Bemis, Polly (Lalu Nathoy) (1853–1933): Perspective 1". In Zhao, Xiaojian; Park, Edward J. W. (eds.). Asian Americans: An Encyclopedia of Social, Cultural, Economic, and Political History. Santa Barbara, California: Greenwood Publishing Group. pp. 143–145. ISBN 978-1-59884-240-1. OCLC 880408751.
- McIntosh, Scott (August 10, 2021). "Story of Polly Bemis shows Chinese Americans are woven into the fabric of Idaho history". Idaho Statesman. McClatchy. ISSN 2688-884X. OCLC 50144804.
- Miller, Sarah A. (August 10, 2021a). "Idaho fifth graders recite essays on the history of Polly Bemis". Idaho Statesman. McClatchy. ISSN 2688-884X. OCLC 50144804.
- Miller, Sarah A. (August 10, 2021b). "Who was famous Idahoan Polly Bemis?". Idaho Statesman. McClatchy. ISSN 2688-884X. OCLC 50144804.
- "June 24–25: Book tour for "Massacred for Gold" and third Chinese Remembering conference are held". Northwest Asian Weekly. Vol. 29, no. 31. Seattle. July 29, 2010. Archived from the original on June 5, 2015.
- "June 23–24: Fourth Annual Chinese Remembering Conference held in Lewiston". Northwest Asian Weekly. Vol. 30, no. 30. Seattle. July 25, 2011. Archived from the original on April 20, 2013.
- "Community members install memorial at Chinese Massacre Cove". Northwest Asian Weekly. Vol. 31, no. 21. Seattle. May 18, 2012a. Archived from the original on August 22, 2014.
- "Supporters attend dedication of memorial at Chinese Massacre Cove". Northwest Asian Weekly. Vol. 31, no. 28. Seattle. July 9, 2012b. Archived from the original on October 29, 2012.
- Oland, Dana (August 8, 2018). "Work starts on Asian supermarket at Boise's new Chinatown mall". Idaho Statesman. McClatchy. ISSN 2688-884X. OCLC 50144804.
- Prentice, George (September 2, 2022). "This gold mining exhibit helps to 'unerase' Idaho's Chinese history". Boise State Public Radio. Archived from the original on September 2, 2022.
- Rohe, Randall E. (2001). "After the Gold Rush: Chinese Mining in the Far West, 1850–1890". In Dirlik, Arif; Yeung, Malcolm (eds.). Chinese on the American Frontier. Pacific Formations: Global Relations in Asian and Pacific Perspectives. Lanham, Maryland: Rowman & Littlefield. pp. 3–26. ISBN 978-0-8476-8532-5. OCLC 44019568.
- Schwantes, Carlos A. (1996) [1989]. The Pacific Northwest: An Interpretive History (Revised and Enlarged ed.). Lincoln, Nebraska: University of Nebraska Press. ISBN 978-0-8032-9228-4. OCLC 32820010.
- Staats, David (December 9, 2020). "Boise to Chinese settlers: We love your gardens. We need your labor. We don't want you". Idaho Statesman. McClatchy. ISSN 2688-884X. OCLC 50144804.
- Stratton, David H. (2001). "The Snake River Massacre of Chinese Miners, 1887". In Dirlik, Arif; Yeung, Malcolm (eds.). Chinese on the American Frontier. Pacific Formations: Global Relations in Asian and Pacific Perspectives. Lanham, Maryland: Rowman & Littlefield. pp. 215–230. ISBN 978-0-8476-8532-5. OCLC 44019568.
- Vincent, Robyn (September 13, 2021). "Despite Its Optics, an Idaho College Town Remains a Complicated Place for People of Color". KUNC. Archived from the original on September 13, 2021.
- Weatherby, James B.; Stapilus, Randy (2005). Governing Idaho: Politics, People and Power. Caldwell, Idaho: Caxton Press. ISBN 978-0-87004-521-9. LCCN 2004029645. OCLC 797915704.
- Wegars, Priscilla (2003). "Polly Bemis: Lurid Life or Literary Legend?". In Riley, Glenda; Etulain, Richard W. (eds.). Wild Women of the Old West. Golden, Colorado: Fulcrum Publishing. pp. 45–68. ISBN 978-1-55591-295-6. LCCN 2002154877. OCLC 51204618.
- Wegars, Priscilla (February 12, 2014a). "Out of the "Tunnels" and into the Light". The Blue Review. Boise State University School of Public Service. Archived from the original on August 4, 2015.
- Wegars, Priscilla (2014b). "Asian American Sites and Museum Exhibits (Pacific Northwest and Great Basin)". In Zhao, Xiaojian; Park, Edward J. W. (eds.). Asian Americans: An Encyclopedia of Social, Cultural, Economic, and Political History. Santa Barbara, California: Greenwood Publishing Group. pp. 96–98. ISBN 978-1-59884-240-1. OCLC 880408751.
- Wegars, Priscilla (2014c). "Bemis, Polly (Lalu Nathoy) (1853–1933): Perspective 2". In Zhao, Xiaojian; Park, Edward J. W. (eds.). Asian Americans: An Encyclopedia of Social, Cultural, Economic, and Political History. Santa Barbara, California: Greenwood Publishing Group. pp. 145–146. ISBN 978-1-59884-240-1. OCLC 880408751.
- Wright, Samantha (May 11, 2015). "Growing Garden City: A History of Chinese Gardens, Gambling and Change". Boise State Public Radio. Archived from the original on October 28, 2021.
- Wright, Samantha (September 6, 2022). "Digging deeper into Idaho's Chinese history". Idaho Matters. Boise State Public Radio. Archived from the original on September 7, 2022.
- Zhu, Liping (2001). ""A Chinaman's Chance" on the Rocky Mountain Mining Frontier". In Dirlik, Arif; Yeung, Malcolm (eds.). Chinese on the American Frontier. Pacific Formations: Global Relations in Asian and Pacific Perspectives. Lanham, Maryland: Rowman & Littlefield. pp. 231–251. ISBN 978-0-8476-8532-5. OCLC 44019568.
