= Asian American studies =

Academic study of Asian American history and experiences

Asian American Studies is an academic field originating in the 1960s, which critically examines the history, issues, sociology, religion, experiences, culture, and policies relevant to Asian Americans. It is closely related to other Ethnic Studies fields, such as African American Studies, Latino Studies, and Native American Studies.

Since the 2020s, Asian American Studies has begun to be taught as part of the K-12 curriculum of a number of American states.

== History ==
Asian American Studies appeared as a field of intellectual inquiry in the late 1960s as a result of strikes by the Third World Liberation Front, a group of ethnic minority students at San Francisco State University and at the University of California, Berkeley. The students demanded that college classroom instruction include the histories of people of color in the United States as told from their perspectives, create an Ethnic Studies program, expand the Black Studies department, admitting more students of color, and hiring more faculty of color in tenure-track positions. The demand for Ethnic Studies was originally a reaction against the Eurocentric bias in university curricula.

As a result of the 1968 strike, a College of Ethnic Studies (the only U.S. university academic department of its kind at the time) was established at San Francisco State University with American Indian Studies, Asian American Studies, Africana Studies, and Latino/a Studies as its four units, and a new Department of Ethnic Studies was established at the University of California, Berkeley, consisting of comparative ethnic studies, Asian American and Asian diaspora studies, Chicana/o and Latina/o studies, and Native American studies.

The demand for Asian American Studies resulted in the creation of new departments throughout in colleges and universities across the country since the 1970s. By 1979, the Association for Asian American Studies, a professional organization designed to promote teaching and academic research in the field, was established in 1979. Then in 1991, twenty-three college and universities formed an “East of California” caucus of the Association for Asian American Studies, to move away from a California-centered understanding of the field, to speak of the many origins and points of departure in the history of Asian American Studies, and to include research on less-studied communities like Filipino Americans and South Asian Americans into the field.

As of today, according to The Asian American Foundation, only 1.6% of colleges and universities in the United States offer an Asian American Studies program. Organizations such as Asian American Studies Collaborative are working with students and professors to add more programs to institutions of higher education across the country.

== Topics ==
Drawing from numerous disciplines such as sociology, history, literature, political science, and gender studies, Asian American Studies scholars consider a variety of perspectives and employ diverse analytical tools in their work. Unlike Asian Studies which focuses on the history, culture, religion, etc. of Asian people living in Asia, Asian American Studies is interested in the history, culture, experiences, of Asians living in the United States.

Academic programs in Asian American Studies examines the history of Asian-Americans, which includes topics such as immigration and race-based exclusion policies. The discourse also includes studies on how first- and second-generation Asian Americans deal with adjustment and assimilation, especially on their Americanization and aggressive pursuit of higher education and prestigious occupations in a society that still discriminates against them.

Asian American Studies focuses on the identities, historical and contemporary experiences of individuals and groups in the United States. Concepts and issues that are crucial to this interdisciplinary curriculum include: Orientalism, settler colonialism, diaspora and transnationalism, gender and sexuality, cultural politics, and media representation.

== K-12 curriculum ==
While Asian American Studies programs at colleges and universities have become more common, Asian Americans remain largely absent from K-12 curriculum in the US. Studies dating back as far as 1969 have consistently found that Asian American history is not included in US history textbooks. State-level social studies standards have also neglected to include Asian American historical figures in historical curricula. In some cases where Asian Americans have been included, they are depicted as the stereotypical dangerous foreigner. A 2022 study found great variance between US states when it comes to the inclusion of Asian American history in state standards. For example, while New York had 14 content strands related to Asian American history that were highly detailed and content-specific, 18 states had no standards for teaching Asian American history. The study also found that the most common topics of Asian American history in state curricula were anti-Asian immigration laws and the internment of Japanese Americans during World War II. Asian Americans were often depicted as victims of racism or new arrivals to America, while depictions of Asian Americans as contributors or change makers were much less common.

Given the absence of Asian Americans in K-12 curriculum, coalitions of parents, students, and teachers have called for curricular reform. Several states have successfully enacted legislation that requires teaching Asian American experiences in K-12 schools.

=== Illinois ===
In July 2021, the Teaching Equitable Asian American Community History (TEAACH) Act was signed into law, making Illinois the first state in the US to require all public schools to teach a unit of Asian American history. The legislation went into effect starting with the 2022-2023 school year. According to the bill, the curriculum should include the contributions of Asian Americans toward civil rights, the contributions of Asian American individuals in government, arts, humanities, and sciences, and the contributions of Asian American communities to the US. Public elementary and high schools in Illinois are also required to include content on the history of Asian Americans in Illinois and the Midwest.

The TEAACH Act was proposed by Illinois legislators amidst rising anti-Asian racism during the COVID-19 pandemic, which included the 2021 Atlanta spa shootings that resulted in the deaths of six Asian American women and two other persons. Prior to the bill's official introduction to the legislature, members of Asian Americans Advancing Justice Chicago, a grassroots organization, had been contacting Asian American officials about mandating the teaching of Asian American experiences in K-12 curricular. The TEAACH Act was primarily authored by Representative Jennifer Gong-Gershowitz and received great support from Asian American representatives in the Illinois legislature, including representatives Teresa Mah and Ram Villivalam. The bill also gained support from African American and Latino legislators, as well as from the Jewish community. According to Representative Gong-Gershowitz:

Asian American history is American history. Yet we are often invisible. The TEAACH Act will ensure that the next generation of Asian American students won't need to attend law school to learn about their heritage. Empathy comes from understanding. We cannot do better unless we know better. A lack of knowledge is the root cause of discrimination and the best weapon against ignorance is education.

=== New Jersey ===
In 2022, New Jersey became the second state to require Asian American and Pacific Islander (AAPI) history in public school curriculum after Governor Phil Murphy signed bill S4021/A6100 into law. The bill was primarily authored by state senator Vin Gopal. On the same day, Governor Murphy also signed another law (S3764/A3369) that will establish a Commission for Asian American Heritage within the state’s Department of Education to help develop curriculum guidelines for public and nonpublic schools in the state. These legislative acts were led by the New Jersey chapter of Make Us Visible (MUV NJ), which has advocated for the teaching of Asian American history and worked to create state resources. For example, members of MUV NJ sent an open letter to Governor Murphy and the New Jersey legislature stating that "our collective ignorance about AAPI history is not only dangerous for AAPI students, but also a clear disservice to all students who are growing up in an increasingly diverse, interconnected, and globalized society and economy." The bills received widespread support from Asian American advocates throughout New Jersey as well as broad, bipartisan support in the state legislature.

=== Connecticut ===
In 2022, Connecticut passed legislation mandating the teaching of AAPI history in public schools, which takes effect in 2025. Notably, Connecticut is the first state to pass this mandate with state funding, allocating more than $140,000 to developing curricula on Asian American history. This legislation was led by the Connecticut state chapter of Make Us Visible (MUV CT), which has advocated for the teaching of Asian American history and worked to create state resources. Dr. Jason Oliver Chang, an associate professor and director of the Asian and American Studies Institute at the University of Connecticut, has led the creation of the curriculum with the Connecticut state department of education.

=== Rhode Island ===
In 2022, Rhode Island governor Dan McKee signed legislation mandating public elementary and secondary schools to include a unit of Asian American, Native Hawaii, and Pacific Islander (AA and NHPI) history in their curriculum. This legislation was led by Rhode Island's chapter of Make Us Visible (MUV RI) and introduced by Representative Barbara Ann Fenton-Fung. The curriculum will also include AA and NHPI history in Rhode Island and the Northeast as well as the contributions of AA and NHPIs to civil rights.

=== Florida ===
In 2023, Florida became the first Republican-led state to require AAPI history instruction in primary and secondary schools after efforts by Florida's chapter of Make Us Visible (MUV FL). This legislation is also the first in the country to specifically require instruction on the internment of Japanese Americans during World War II. The bipartisan bill was introduced by Cuban American legislators Representative Susan Plasencia and Senator Ana Maria Rodriguez. The bill unanimously passed through the Floor of the House of Representatives and was co-sponsored by Black, Latino, and Jewish legislators. The state has convened a working group to align state standards with the new law.

=== Delaware ===
In 2024, Delaware became the seventh state to require AANHPI history instruction in primary and secondary schools after efforts by Delaware's chapter of Make Us Visible (MUV DE). This legislation requires the inclusion of Asian American, Native Hawaiian, and Pacific Islander history as well as other racial, ethnic, and cultural histories in Delaware's K-12 classrooms. The bipartisan bill was introduced by Senate Majority Leader Bryan Townsend and Representative Sophie Phillips. The bill was unanimously passed through both chambers of the legislature.

=== Maine ===
In 2026, Maine became the eighth state to require AANHPI history instruction in primary and secondary schools after efforts by Maine's chapter of Make Us Visible (MUV ME). Notably, Maine is the lowest-percentage Asian American state (1.2% Asian alone; 1.9% Asian alone or in combination), ranking fifth behind West Virginia, Mississippi, Montana, and Wyoming, to adopt such a mandate. In addition to requiring AANHPI history, LD 957 establishes a fully funded advisory committee to collect information and prepare classroom-ready teaching materials. The law also directs the Maine Department of Education to identify and make available instructional resources, develop best practices and exemplar modules, provide a progress report on implementation, and enable school districts to conduct curriculum audits. The bill, introduced by Representative Eleanor Sato and sponsored by Democrats, Republicans, and Independents, passed unanimously in both chambers.

=== Other states ===
Make Us Visible has chapters in 24 total states in the US, which have continued to work towards the integration of Asian American experiences into K-12 curriculum. In Alaska, Senator Elvi Gray-Jackson has introduces a bill requiring Asian American and Pacific Islander history in K-12 schools. In Arizona, state senator John Kavanagh has introduced a bill requiring Asian American, Native Hawaiian, and Pacific Islander history in K-12 public schools. In Washington, state senator T'wina Nobles has introduced a bill requiring Asian American, Native Hawaiian, and Pacific Islander history in K-12 public schools. In Virginia, House Delegate Marty Martinez has introduced a bill establishing an Asian American and Pacific Islander History Education Commission to oversee and advise educational standards changes.

== Universities and colleges with departments and programs ==
- Arizona State University
- Binghamton University
- Brandeis University
- California State University, Fullerton
- California State University, Long Beach
- California State University, Northridge
- City College of San Francisco
- College of William and Mary
- Columbia University
- Cornell University
- Duke University
- Fordham University
- Hunter College, City University of New York
- New York University
- Northwestern University
- Queens College, City University of New York
- San Francisco State University
- State University of New York at Stony Brook
- St Cloud State University
- The Claremont Colleges
- Tufts University
- University of California, Berkeley
- University of California, Davis
- University of California, Irvine
- University of California, Los Angeles
- University of California, San Diego
- University of California, Santa Barbara
- University of Colorado at Boulder
- University of Hawai’i
- University of Illinois at Urbana–Champaign
- University of Maryland, College Park
- University of Minnesota
- University of Pennsylvania
- University of Southern California
- University of Texas at Austin
- University of Washington
- Vassar College

== Prominent academics ==
- Roger Buckley, University of Connecticut
- Jeffery Paul Chan, San Francisco State University
- Lucie Cheng, UCLA
- E. J. R. David, University of Alaska
- Kip Fulbeck, University of California, Santa Barbara
- Emma Gee, UCLA
- Evelyn Nakano Glenn, University of California, Berkeley
- Daniel Phil Gonzales, San Francisco State University
- Haivan Hoang, UMass Amherst
- Madeline Y. Hsu, University of Texas at Austin
- Yuji Ichioka, UCLA
- Russell Jeung, San Francisco State University
- Jerry Kang, UCLA
- Nitasha Tamar Sharma, Northwestern University
- Elaine H. Kim, UC Berkeley
- Peter Kwong, Hunter College, CUNY Graduate Center
- Him Mark Lai, independent scholar
- Vinay Lal, UCLA
- Esther Kim Lee, Duke University
- Elizabeth Lew-Williams, Princeton University
- Russell Leong, UCLA
- Huping Ling, Truman State University
- David Wong Louie, UCLA
- Lisa Lowe, Yale University
- Martin F. Manalansan IV, University of Minnesota, Twin Cities
- Gary R. Mar, State University of New York at Stony Brook
- Kevin Nadal, City University of New York
- Lisa Nakamura, University of Illinois at Urbana–Champaign
- Don Nakanishi, UCLA
- Robert Nakamura, UCLA
- Mae Ngai, Columbia University
- Viet Thanh Nguyen, USC
- Gary Okihiro, Columbia University
- Michael Omi, University of California, Berkeley
- Rhacel Parrenas, Brown University
- Celine Parrenas Shimizu, University of California, Santa Barbara
- Robyn Rodriguez, University of California, Davis
- Alexander Saxton, UCLA
- Derald Wing Sue, Columbia University
- Betty Lee Sung, CUNY
- Ronald Takaki, University of California, Berkeley
- Shawn Wong, University of Washington
- David Yoo, UCLA
- Ji-Yeon Yuh, Northwestern University
- Judy Yung, University of California, Santa Cruz
- Min Zhou, UCLA

== Celebrities who studied Asian American Studies ==
- Randall Park, UCLA
- Ali Wong, UCLA
