= Dennis Dun =

American actor (born 1952)

- Born: Dennis Gong Dun; April 19, 1952 (age 74); Stockton, California, U.S.
- Occupation: Actor
- Spouse: Anna Wang

Dennis Gong Dun (born April 19, 1952) is an American stage and screen actor.

== Early life and education ==
Of Chinese Jamaican descent, Dun was born in Stockton, California. He trained in martial arts and Chinese opera growing up. He originally studied marketing in college, before developing an interest in acting.

== Career ==
=== Theatre ===
Dun began acting at the Asian American Theater Company in San Francisco, California. He has appeared onstage at East West Players, Berkeley Repertory Theatre, and Lodestone Theatre Ensemble. For his performance in Chay Yew's A Language of Their Own at the Celebration Theatre, he won an LA Weekly Theater Award for Ensemble Performance (shared with Noel Alumit, Anthony David and Chris Tashima). He has participated in both the film and theatre labs at the Sundance Institute.

Dun wrote and performed the one-man show Giant Oranges, commissioned by the Mark Taper Forum and produced by Chay Yew's Solo Works Festival in Los Angeles.

=== Film and television ===
Dun made his film debut in Michael Cimino's crime drama Year of the Dragon (1985). He was cast to play the co-lead role, Wang Chi, in John Carpenter's cult classic film Big Trouble in Little China (1986). He played Puyi's valet Big Li in the historical epic The Last Emperor (1987), which won nine Oscars including Best Picture.

Dun has also had prominent roles in Carpenter's Prince of Darkness (1987), Life Is Cheap... But Toilet Paper Is Expensive (1989), Thousand Pieces of Gold (1991), and Warriors of Virtue (1997).

In addition, he has appeared in independent Asian American projects such as My American Vacation (1999) and My Life Disoriented (2006).

For three seasons he was a regular cast member on the NBC television series Midnight Caller (1988–1991).

== Filmography ==
=== Film ===
Year	Title	Role	Notes
1985	Year of the Dragon	Herbert Kwong	
1986	Big Trouble in Little China	Wang Chi	
1987	The Last Emperor	Big Li	
1987	Prince of Darkness	Walter	
1989	Life Is Cheap... But Toilet Paper Is Expensive	Narrator	
1991	Thousand Pieces of Gold	Jim	
1992	The Kiss	The Kiss Man	Short
1995	Venus Rising	Eddie	
1996	Up Close & Personal	Satellite Van Technician	
1996	Good Luck	Chang	
1997	Warriors of Virtue	Ming	
1997	Dog Watch	Lee	
1999	Journey from the Heart	Henry	
1999	Pros & Cons	Head of the tuxedo gang	
2002	Safe Journey	Man	Short
2002	A Ribbon of Dreams	Pai-Woo (voice)	
2018	Something Horrible	Randolph Carter	
2024	Endling	Richard Chen	Short

=== Television ===
Year	Title	Role	Notes
1984	Partners in Crime	Jimmy's Pal	Episode: "Duke"
1988	Beauty and the Beast	Henry Pei	Episode: "China Moon"
1988-91	Midnight Caller	Billy Po	61 episodes
1995	Grace Under Fire	Walter	Episode: "No Money Down"
1998	The Nanny	Doctor Fu	Episode: "Making Whoopi"
2001	Charmed	Mr. Chang	Episode: "Wrestling with Demons"
2001	JAG	Capt. Jarot	2 episodes
2002	The Bernie Mac Show	Doctor	Episode: "The Sweet Life"
2004	All Grown Up!	Japanese Airline Rep/Hawaiian Airline Rep	Episode: "The Finster Who Stole Christmas"
2006	Independent Lens	Johnny Fung	Episode: "My Life..Disoriented"
2012	Luck	Leo Chan	4 Episodes
