= Valencia Tool & Die =

1980s era San Francisco music and art venue

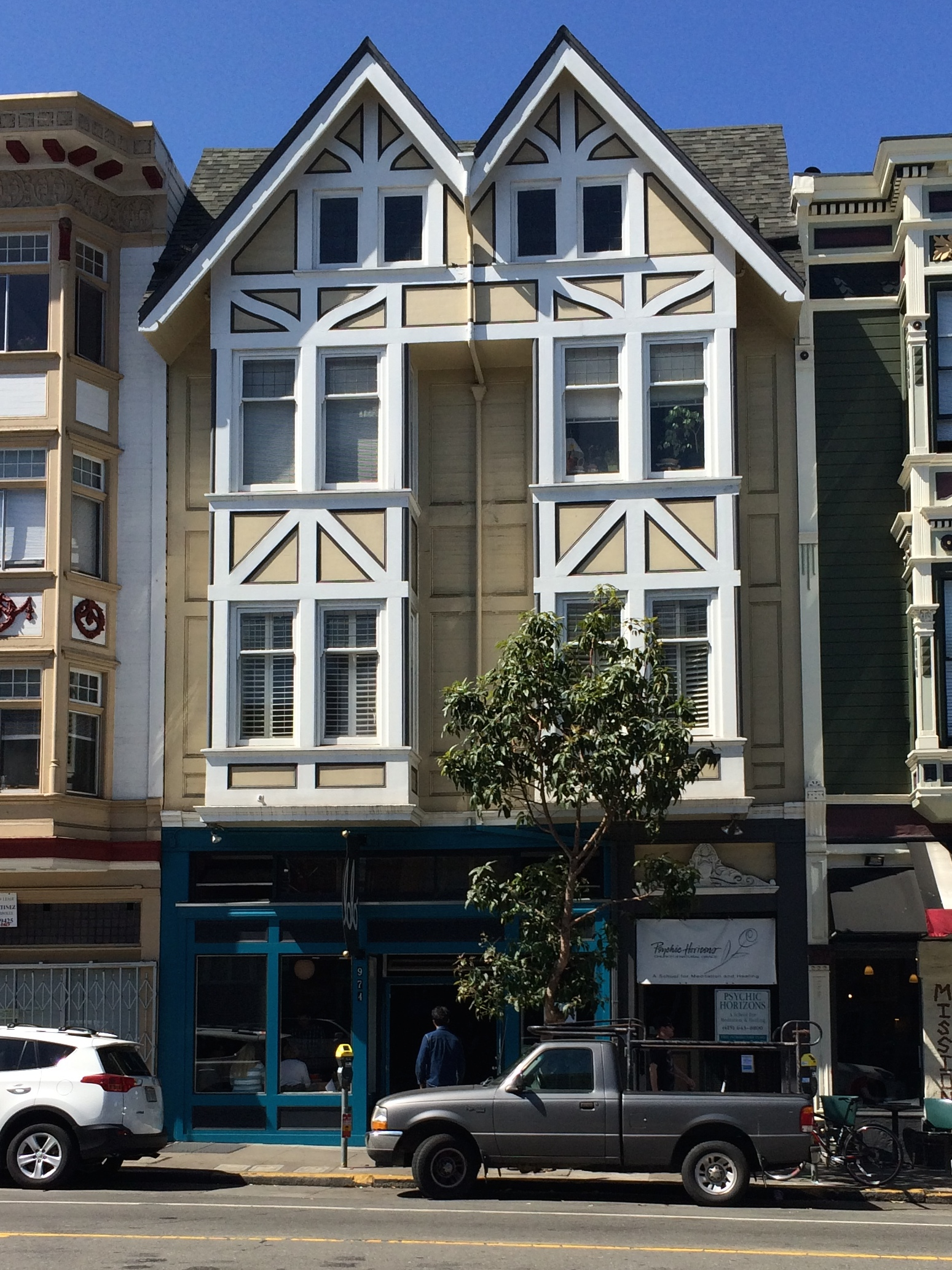
974 Valencia Street, in 2015

Valencia Tool & Die (VT&D), was a music venue and art gallery active from 1980 through 1983 in the Mission District of San Francisco, California. It was founded by Peter Belsito and Jim Stockford, and presented punk, new wave, and new music performances, as well as performance art, film, and visual art shows.

== History ==
Valencia Tool & Die, which to a passerby appeared to be an empty store front with no signage to identify it other than the street number, was located in the Mission District at 974 Valencia. The interior space consisted of a street level gallery/performance space and a subterranean cellar performance space. The cellar space was reached through a trap door and a narrow staircase, which led Damage Magazine publisher Brad Lapin to label it "the black hole of Calcutta." Performances often took place on both levels simultaneously, and usually featured Bay Area talent. VT&D was often open after hours and many of its best performances took place after San Francisco's 2 a.m. curfew in the cellar performance space which had been insulated with sand to dampen the sound. VT&D's location was only a few blocks from the Valencia police station, but the after hours performances continued uninterrupted for the first two years. During the third year the club was overrun by hardcore punks who made the location more conspicuous with graffiti and the club was closed for fire code and alcohol violations shortly afterward. Although VT&D did not exclusively book punk shows, most of the artists that appeared there ascribed to the DIY (do it yourself) philosophy of punk.

By mid-1981 Valencia Tool & Die had begun to book hardcore punk and thrashcore shows featuring three bands for three dollars, a policy which had disappeared years before [elsewhere in San Francisco]. The Die was a street-level storefront with a semi-sound proof basement, a seven-foot ceiling laced with pipes, brick walls and a concrete floor. The bands stood on the same floor face to face with the crammed sweltering audiences. Beer could be had for a dollar, and gigs would begin after San Francisco's curfew, when bands like L.A.s Social Distortion and other touring bands would appear unannounced after performing elsewhere in SF earlier in the evening. Upstairs people would drink, smoke, socialize, graffiti the walls, scream, fight or curl up for some sleep. Outside on the sidewalk there would inevitably be a dozen or two skulking kids in the nearby doorways, or leaning on parked cars while catching a breath of smokeless air."

Bill Mandel, in his article "In defense of punk rock: It's the liveliest art-form of the '80s", went on to say of the Bay Area punk scene: "The clubs aren't cushy, to say the least. Such venues as Mabuhay Gardens (still the purest), Sound of Music (heavy-duty punk), the (I-Beam, Dreamland, California Hall, the Russian Center, the American Indian Center, Valencia Tool & Die, and Berkeley Square, among others, are raw and industrial."

Tim Yohannon of Maximum Rock and Roll described VT&D several times in reviews of shows in the basement venue. In an article in August 1982 bemoaning the lack of hardcore shows being produced on Broadway Yohannon wrote "Outside of Ruthies (probably the best venue for H.C., the "guerilla" shows remain the most true-to-form punk. Gigs at Barrington Hall in Berkeley, New Method Industries in Oakland, and the occasional party at Valencia Tool & Die are the rowdiest (the heart of the scene) with a full cast of day-to-day regulars." In another article reviewing a show at the Die he wrote "Great show! Lot of yahooing downstairs and lots of yakking upstairs. Plenty of people at this gig arranged by MDC, and the crowd was pretty friendly - no real fights (which seem to be on the decline), and a lot of women thrashing." At the end of 1982 and throughout 1983, the Tool & Die was managed by Jak's Skateboard Team member, Bill Halen aka Bill McCracken who also was one of the owners of Government Records at The Compound. During his tenure, Halen worked with Timmy Yohannon, Dirk Dirksen, Paul Rat, Kevin Thatcher of Thrasher Magazine, Dream manager of The Circle Jerks just to name a few fellow promoters and supporters of the underground music scene throughout the U.S. These were the most prolific years of the club with shows booked every Friday, Saturday nights and some Sunday afternoon matinees.

== Venue performers ==
Some of the punk bands and new music musicians that performed at Valencia Tool & Die included: Black Flag, Hüsker Dü, Faith No Man (the first incarnation of Faith No More), Flipper, Dead Kennedys, Toxic Reasons, Social Distortion, Minor Threat, DRI, Butthole Surfers, Verbal Abuse, The Units, The Nubs, The Job featuring the beat generation poet Allen Ginsberg, the girl groups The Contractions and The Varve, Vancouver's Pointed Sticks, Translator, Code of Honor, The Tanks, The Lewd, Timmy Spence, Clocks of Paradise, Barry Beam, Los Microwaves, The Symptoms, The Neutrinoz, The Dickheads, The Invertebrates, Mr. E and the Necromantics, Ribzy, Executioner, Los Olvidados, Crucifix, PLH, UXB, Fifth Column, Red Kross, Social Unrest, Bad Posture, Fang, Rebel Truth, Intensified Chaos, The German Shepards, Arkansas Man, Ultra-Sheen, Nervous Gender, The Zeros, The Appliances, Henry Kuntz, Loren Means, John Gruntfest, Steve Ruppenthal, Bonnie Hayes and The Punts, Voice Farm, and Indoor Life. Tommy Tutone spent several days at Tool & Die in 1982 rehearsing and refining their hit song 867-5309/Jenny shortly before they recorded it.

Shortly after Allen Ginsberg's appearance at Valencia Tool & Die, this short piece appeared in Herb Caen's column in the San Francisco Chronicle. "I have a punk pen pal who signs herself Pheno Barbidol and tries to keep me clued in to what's happening on the new wave scene around here. I assume Pheno is a she since the letters, generally chiding in tone, include a red lipstick imprint under the signature. Of course, in San Francisco, one never knows, but in my mind, Pheno is all girl and also literate. Her latest screed begins: "Well you did it again, you culturally disoriented old reprobate. You really missed the boat with your weekend activities. What did you do … go to some incredibly boring cocktail party? Or maybe you hobnobbed at another one of your mindless middle class galas? Ugh. What you could have been doing instead — if you'd pay attention to the fliers you see splashed like pimples on S.F.'s fragile face — is see history in the making on Friday night at the Tool & Die on Valencia. That's right, bucko. History! … Allen Ginsberg was there singing his own new wave song, 'Capitol Air,' with new wave band extraordinaire, The Job."

In its April 1983 issue San Francisco Magazine's Michael Goldberg wrote in his article "Punk Premises": "If you want to see hard-core punk, the place to go is the Valencia Tool & Die, sometimes simply referred to as the Die." Later in the article Goldberg continued: "With its low ceiling, wooden posts (running down the middle of the room to provide support) and brick walls, this place reminds one of the hideaways devised during the Nazis' reign of terror. The smell is beer and smoke and dust. (Beer is sold out of a closet.) There is no stage. The bands set up on the floor at one end of the room, with no barrier between audience and the performers, so band members can move easily into the crowd and join the slamming if they want to."

== Diverse audiences ==
Poster for VT&D activities during the Western Front Festival. © Peter Belsito, 1980

During the Western Front Festival of 1980, Valencia Tool & Die mounted a show of poster art that originally promoted punk shows in San Francisco, the highlights of which were later published in book called StreetArt: The Punk Poster in San Francisco 1977-1981,1981, Last Gasp. The poster show which featured over 500 posters and flyers was curated by Peter Belsito, Susan Pedrick, and Bob Davis.

In 1980 Valencia Tool & Die hosted Mainstream Exiles: A Lesbian and Gay Men's Cultural Festival which included visual art, film, performance art and poetry by gay and lesbian artists over a six-day period from November 4 through November 9. Artists who participated in Mainstream Exiles were: Leonie Guyer, Bill Jacobson, Kim Anno, Will Roscoe, Beth Rose, Blackberri, Swingshift, Avotcja, Inner Peace Rainbow, Susan Griffin, Randy Johnson, Cherrie Moraga-Lawrence, Emanuel Ro, Karen Brodine, Steve Abbott, Judy Grahn, Robert Gluck, Canyon Sam, Tede Matthews, Rose Mitchell, David Arndt, The Sisters of Perpetual Indulgence, Jan and Vicki, Brown Bag Theater, Chris Tanner now known as VonTanner, Ruth Schoenbach, Carol Roberts, Michael Barry, March Thomas Armstrong, Lesbians Against Police Violence, M. J. Lallo, Gay Theater Collective, Adele Prandini, Whole Works Theater, Canyon Sam and Genny Lim of Unbound Feet, Marilyn Curry, Marc Huestis, James Armstrong, Ann Hershey, Connie Hatch, Michael Brayton, Allen Page and Susana Blaustein.
