= Polly Bemis =

Chinese American pioneer (1853–1933)

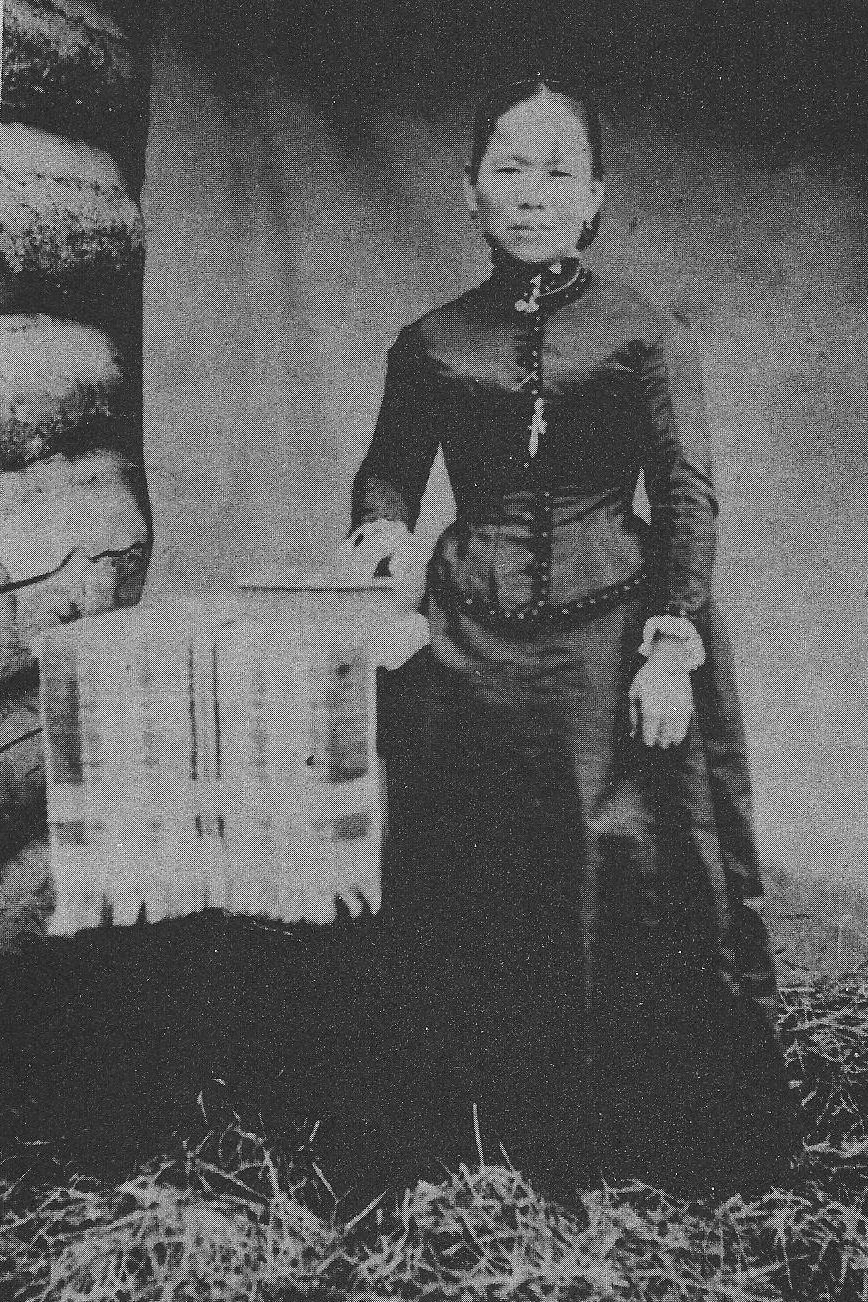
- Bemis wearing her wedding dress in 1894
- Born: 11 September 1853; China
- Died: 6 November 1933 (aged 80); Idaho, US
- Resting place: Polly Bemis House, Idaho
- Other name: Lalu Nathoy
- Occupation: Rancher
- Spouse: Charles "Charlie" A. Bemis (m. 1894; died 1922)

Polly Bemis (September 11, 1853 – November 6, 1933) was a Chinese American pioneer who lived in Idaho in the late 19th and early 20th century. Her story became a biographical novel titled Thousand Pieces of Gold, which was adapted into a 1991 film.

== Early life ==
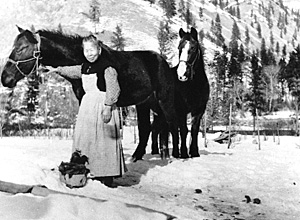
Polly with her horses Nellie and Julie, Feb 6, 1910

On September 11, 1853, Polly was born in rural northern China, near one of the upper villages. As a child, Polly had bound feet, which were later unbound. When she was eighteen, there was a prolonged drought, during which her father sold her to bandits for two much-needed bags of seed.

In 1872, Polly was smuggled into the United States and sold as a slave in San Francisco, California, for $2,500. It was common for Chinese men of that time to have multiple wives and concubines, all having some social status and living under the same roof. When a Chinese man moved to North America, he might take a concubine with him or acquire one there, as custom required him to leave his wife in China to take care of his parents. An intermediary took her from San Francisco via Portland, Oregon, to Idaho, where her buyer, a wealthy Chinese man, possibly named Hong King, ran a saloon in a mining camp in Warren, Idaho Territory, now Warren, Idaho. She arrived in Warren on July 8, 1872. Polly was 53 inches (130 cm) tall.

How Polly gained her freedom from her Chinese captor is uncertain. According to academic Priscilla Wegars, her Chinese owner helped her gain her freedom. In mid-1880, the census listed her as living with saloon owner and fiddler Charlie Bemis (1848–1922), who befriended her when she first arrived in Warren, and protected her from unwanted advances. Charlie's "fearless personality, coupled with his skill at shooting, enabled him to maintain order without getting into trouble". During her time in her Chinese owner's saloon, Polly would often call for Charlie if "things got too rough", or she would leave through the saloon's back door and enter through Charlie's, who "never failed her".

== Career ==
Polly Bemis was not financially dependent on Charlie Bemis. Polly took in laundry from miners and ran a boarding house that Charlie Bemis built for her next to his own, a short distance from his saloon. Charlie was almost killed during a gambling dispute in September 1890, when he was shot in the cheek, and Polly nursed him back to health. In addition to laundry and nursing skills, Polly was an expert at angler fishing in the Salmon River.

== Personal life ==
On August 13, 1894, Polly married Charlie Bemis, son of a Connecticut Yankee jeweler. They moved from Warren to a site 17 miles north by trail at a spot that came to be called both Bemis Point and Polly Place. Peter Klinkhammer, the couple's friend, reported that this was a marriage of convenience, as Polly needed to establish legal residency in the US and Charlie Bemis needed someone to take care of him. Polly's struggle for legal permanent residency went to the courts in Moscow, Idaho, and her residency was finally granted on August 10, 1896, in Helena, Montana. Together, Charlie and Polly Bemis filed a mining claim, becoming among the first pioneers to settle along the Salmon River (The River of No Return), only several yards from the riverside. Even today this house is not accessible by road. Boats are a common means of access. Although the couple had no children—Polly was 40 when they married—she was noted for her concern for children. They also were known to garden and care for a number of animals, including horses and a cougar. Polly was also noted for her nursing skills, fishing, friendliness, wit, and sense of humor.

Polly saved Charlie's life a second time. In the summer of 1922, a fire gutted their home on the Salmon River, possibly caused by an untended or overheated woodstove. Charlie was inside at the time, and Polly, along with their friend Shepp, rescued him from the burning house. The couple moved across the Salmon River to live with mining partners Peter Klinkhammer and Charlie Shepp, both German, who had been long-time neighbors and friends.

In late October 1922, Charlie Bemis died. He had been ill in the last several years, reportedly due to a lung ailment (probably tuberculosis).

Klinkhammer and Shepp rebuilt a new home for Polly on the same spot as the one that had burned down, with the understanding that they would inherit this from her in exchange for their labor and for looking after her in her old age. During construction, she moved to Warren. While on a trip to Boise, Idaho, she stayed at the Idanha hotel and saw her first movie, rode her first streetcar, and had her first elevator ride. Polly gave the photo of herself in her wedding dress to a young schoolgirl, Gay Carrey, who boarded with her during the academic year during this time. In 1924 she moved back to the now completed cabin on Salmon River.

On August 4, 1933, Shepp came to visit Polly and found her lying on the ground, incoherent and incapacitated following what may have been a stroke. On August 6 she was taken to Grangeville, Idaho, where she stayed in the Idaho Valley Hospital for three months. Loquacious during her hospitalization, she spoke about many details of her life, and on November 5 a lengthy newspaper article was published about her.

On November 6, 1933, Polly died of myocarditis in Grangeville, Idaho at the age of 80. Two days later, Polly was buried in Grangeville, Idaho. After Klinkhammer's death in 1970, his sister bought a marker for Polly's grave.

== Legacy ==
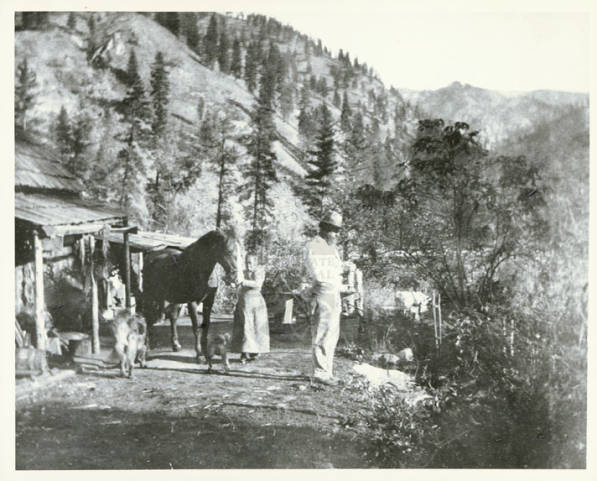
Charles and Polly Bemis

In 1987, the cabin, known as Polly Bemis House, was restored. Polly's body was reburied on the grounds by the cabin, which is located 17 miles north of Warren, Idaho. The cabin became a museum, and in 1988, it was placed on the National Register of Historic Places. In 1987, a dedication ceremony was held and Idaho Governor Cecil Andrus stated, "The history of Polly Bemis is a great part of the legacy of central Idaho. She is the foremost pioneer on the rugged Salmon River." Polly was inducted into the Idaho Hall of Fame in 1996.

Polly is the subject of a series of paintings, Chinese in Idaho, by Chinese-American artist Hung Liu. The University of Idaho has described her as "Idaho's most famous Chinese woman," and offered an anthropology course called "The World of Polly Bemis".

In 2023 the Lost Apple Project re-discovered a variety of apple on the Bemis' ranch, which has been named the 'Polly Bemis' apple.

== Ongoing biographical debates ==
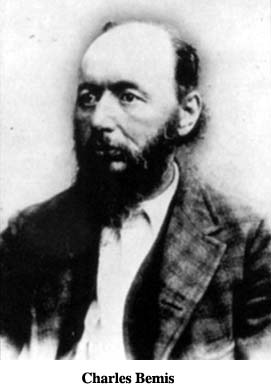
Charles Bemis

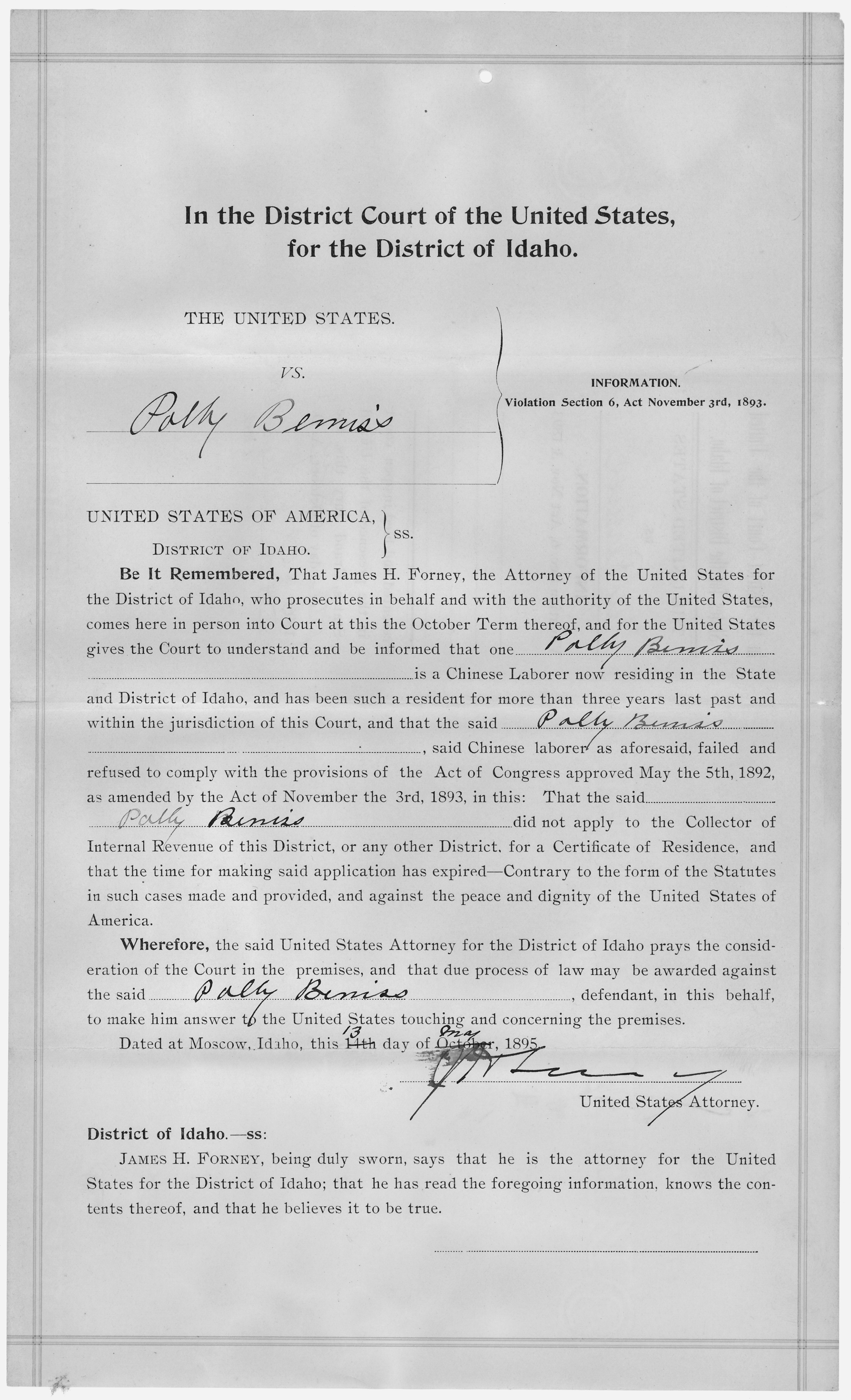
1895 court case involving Polly Bemis, who could not renew her residence papers due to an Idaho snowstorm

Current biographers continue to debate the details of Polly Bemis' life. For example, there is little evidence that she was ever actually known as "Lalu" or that "Hong King" was really her owner's name. Also, there is no evidence that Polly was actually a prostitute; from a cultural standpoint, it is more likely that Polly was a concubine. One National Park Service site claims she was an indentured dance hostess. Finally, as she neared death, Polly denied the long-standing public belief that she was "won in a poker game."

According to a summary of author McCunn's research in the San Francisco Chronicle, "Charlie married Polly to prevent her from being deported as a result of the 1892 Geary Act, which required legal Chinese residents to carry a certificate of admission, something Polly lacked. Despite Idaho's anti-miscegenation laws, the Bemises were wed by a white judge, who himself was married to a Tukudeka Indian."

== Books and films about her life ==
- A biography was written in the 1970s – see Idaho County's Most Romantic Character: Polly Bemis by Sister M Alfreda Elsensohn (published by Benedictine Sisters; Second Printing in 1987).
- Thousand Pieces of Gold is a 1981 biographical historical novel about Lalu Nathoy/Polly Bemis and includes an essay in which the author, Ruthanne Lum McCunn, documents her research for the book and her discoveries in the years since Polly's death. This novel was later adapted into the 1991 film Thousand Pieces of Gold, starring Rosalind Chao (as Polly) and Chris Cooper (as Charlie).
- Polly Bemis: A Chinese American Pioneer, written by Priscilla Wegars and published in 2003, is a noted elementary classroom history book.
- The Poker Bride: The First Chinese in the Wild West, by Christopher Corbett (2010).
- Wild Women of the Old West, pp. 45–68, 200–203, edited by Glenda Riley and Richard W. Etulain, Golden, CO: Fulcrum (2003), ISBN 978-1-55591-295-6.

== See also ==
- The Concubine's Children
- Afong Moy
- History of Chinese Americans in Idaho
