= Peter Kwong =

Peter Kwong may refer to:

- Peter Kwong (academic) (1941–2017), Chinese professor of Asian American studies at Hunter College in New York City
- Peter Kwong (bishop) (born 1936), Chinese Anglican bishop in Hong Kong
- Peter Kwong (actor) (1952–2025), American actor
