= Brodine =

Brodine is a surname. Notable people with the surname include:

- Karen Brodine (1947–1987), American dancer
- Mason Brodine (born 1988), American football player
- Norbert Brodine (1896–1970), American cinematographer
