= Chinese Odd Fellows Building =

- U.S. National Register of Historic Places
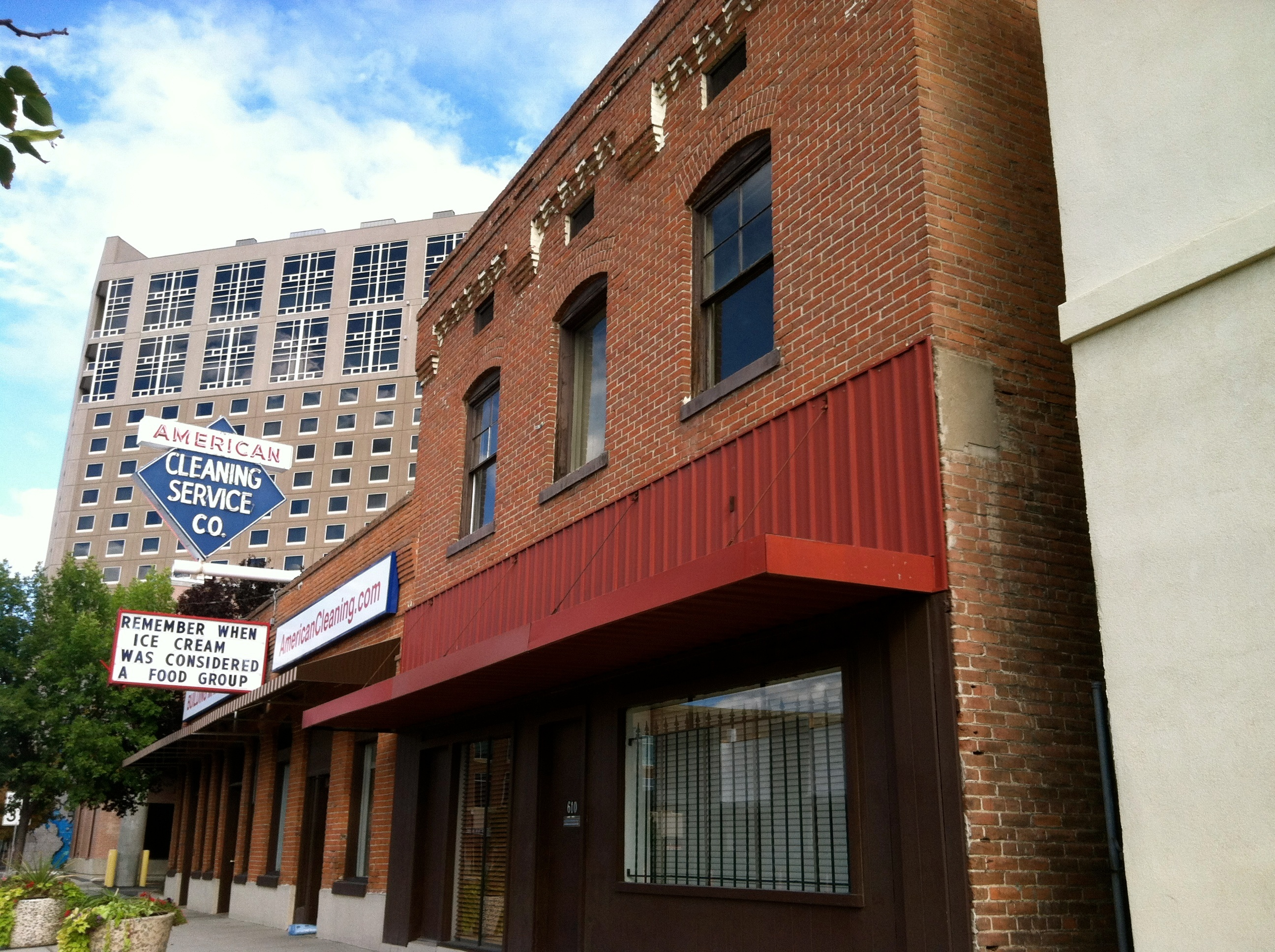
- The Chinese Odd Fellows Building at 610-612 Front St. (foreground)

- Location within Idaho Location within the United States
- Location: 610-612 Front St., Boise, Idaho
- Coordinates: 43°36′49″N 116°12′7″W
- Area: less than one acre
- Built: 1911
- Architect: Tourtellotte & Hummel; Clifton & Corbridge
- MPS: Tourtellotte and Hummel Architecture TR
- NRHP reference No.: 82000187
- Added to NRHP: November 17, 1982

The Chinese Odd Fellows Building is a two-story, thirty-by-sixty foot, privately owned brick commercial building in the historical Chinatown of Boise, Idaho. It is located on West Front Street between South Capital Boulevard and South 6th Street near the Basque Block. The building features a corbel table of projecting bricks with stepped segments.

Built in 1911, it was a Odd Fellows fraternal building, and is one of the few surviving buildings associated with the Chinese immigrant community in downtown Boise. The building was listed on the National Register of Historic Places in 1982. It served historically as a clubhouse and as a business with shops on the first floor, and a lodge hall and sleeping rooms on the second floor.

The building was one of many designed or built by the Tourtellotte and Hummel architectural firm of Boise that were covered in a 1982 study. Contractors Clifton and Corbridge erected the structure in the winter of 1911-1912 for the contract price of $4,648.

== See also ==
- History of Chinese Americans in Idaho
- List of Odd Fellows buildings
- National Register of Historic Places listings in Ada County, Idaho
