= Thousand Pieces of Gold (film) =

1991 film

- Original theatrical poster
- Directed by: Nancy Kelly
- Screenplay by: Anne Makepeace
- Based on: Thousand Pieces of Gold by Ruthanne Lum McCunn
- Produced by: Sidney Kantor; Lindsay Law; John Sham
- Starring: Rosalind Chao; Dennis Dun; Michael Paul Chan; Chris Cooper
- Cinematography: Bobby Bukowski
- Edited by: Kenji Yamamoto
- Music by: Gary Malkin
- Distributed by: Greycat Films
- Release date: April 26, 1991
- Running time: 105 minutes
- Country: United States
- Languages: English; Chinese
- Budget: $2 million
- Box office: $717,772

Thousand Pieces of Gold is a 1991 Western film starring Rosalind Chao, Chris Cooper, Dennis Dun and Michael Paul Chan, and is directed by Nancy Kelly. The film is based on a novel of the same name.

== Plot ==
Lalu is a young Chinese woman who is sold by her impoverished family and transported against her will to the American West in 1880. Upon her arrival in California, she meets Jim, a Chinese "wife trader" who sells her to Hong King, a successful Chinese merchant who lives in an Idaho mining town. The two set off on the long journey to Idaho and eventually strike up a friendship along the way.

When they finally arrive in the rough, isolated town, she is distraught to discover that she is not going to be Hong King's wife. Instead, she is to work in his saloon as his newest prostitute under a new name, "China Polly". She is further dismayed when Jim abruptly disappears, leaving her to fend for herself.

The following night, when Hong King tries to sell her virtue to the highest bidder, Lalu violently refuses to submit to her would-be suitors and successfully avoids becoming a prostitute, thanks in part to the intervention of a kind stranger, Charlie Bemis, who turns out to be Hong King's Caucasian partner. She placates a furious Hong King and convinces him to allow her to be his servant and saloon maid in order to repay the cost of her purchase. Hong King agrees to let her buy her freedom for the impossible sum of a thousand pieces of gold.

Polly, as Lalu comes to be known, endures great hardship. At one point, she is sexually assaulted by Hong King. However, she refuses to give up. She works hard and makes friends with the local townspeople. She also grows closer to Charlie, who begins to fall deeply in love with her. Meanwhile, Hong King is beset with financial problems and decides to sell Polly to the highest bidder. In a rare stroke of luck, Charlie wins her in a game of poker. She moves in with him but insists they remain platonic and keep separate quarters.

Jim comes back and wants her to be with him but he then leaves her again when he finds out that she is living with Charlie. The "white demons" begin to run out the Chinese people from their town so it will be a purely white town and the Chinese will stop getting all of the gold.

Polly works in many jobs and saves money to go back to China and her family, but ultimately ends up falling in love with Charlie. She marries him and lives the rest of her life with him in a different area so she will not be harassed by the white demons anymore.

== Cast ==
- Rosalind Chao as Lalu/Polly
- Chris Cooper as Charlie
- Michael Paul Chan as Hong King
- Dennis Dun as Jim
- Jimmie F. Skaggs as Jonas
- Will Oldham as Miles
- David Hayward as Ohio
- Beth Broderick as Berthe
- Kim Chen as Li Pong
- Freda Foh Shen as Ah Ling
- Chris Evans as Sailor #2

== Production ==
The original title of the film was Gold Mountain. On a budget of $2 million, principal photography began in May 1989. Filming locations included Virginia City, Nevada City, and Ennis—all in the state of Montana. The sequences set in San Francisco were filmed in Butte, Montana. Production wrapped in July 1989.

== Release and reception ==
Thousand Pieces of Gold was released in theatres in November 1991, two years after it was filmed. It made $717,772 at the box office.

On Rotten Tomatoes, the film holds a rating of 88% from 43 reviews. The consensus summarizes: "Thousand Pieces of Gold's technical deficiencies are handily outweighed by sterling work from a 24-karat cast -- and a story that has a fresh perspective on the American Old West."
