= Polly Bemis House =

Historic house in Idaho, United States

- U.S. National Register of Historic Places
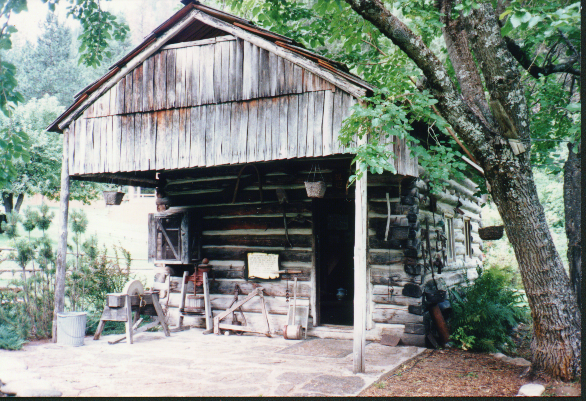
- Polly Bemis House in July 1994

- Location within Idaho Location within the United States
- Nearest city: Riggins, Idaho
- Coordinates: 45°25′59″N 115°40′13″W
- Area: 200 acres (81 ha)
- Built: 1894, rebuilt 1923
- NRHP reference No.: 87002152
- Added to NRHP: March 4, 1988

Polly Bemis House was the home of Charles Bemis and his wife Polly Bemis, two pioneers to Idaho County, Idaho, United States, who lived alongside the Salmon River in the late 19th and early 20th centuries. Polly was a Chinese American former teenage slave whose story became a biographical novel and was fictionalized in the 1991 film A Thousand Pieces of Gold.

== History and background ==
Charlie and Polly Bemis were among the first pioneers to settle along the Salmon River (The River of No Return), only a few yards from the riverside. It was a mining claim rather than a homestead. Even today this house is not accessible by road; boats are a common means of access. In 1922, a fire gutted the Bemis home on the Salmon River, possibly caused by an untended or overheated woodstove; Charlie died soon afterwards. He had been ill in the previous several years, reportedly suffering from a lung ailment (probably tuberculosis). In 1923, Peter Klinkhammer and Charlie Shepp, who lived on the other side of the Salmon River on the east side of the confluence of Crooked Creek, helped Polly to rebuild a new home in the same spot as the one that burned down. Except for a short stay in Warren, Idaho, she lived there until 1933, when she moved to Grangeville, Idaho, dying shortly thereafter. While on a trip to Boise, Idaho, she stayed at the Idanha hotel and saw her first movie, rode her first streetcar, and had her first elevator ride.

The Polly Bemis House is located 44 miles (71 km) east of Riggins, Idaho, and 17 miles (27 km) north of Warren, Idaho.

The house meets two criteria of the National Register of Historic Places: criterion A for its connection with the social history of Chinese women in Idaho and criterion C as an excellent example of wooden logs and shingles construction and of the gable-front single-pen dwellings used in the central Idaho mountains. Some stone was also used in its construction. The house was listed on the National Register of Historic Places on March 4, 1988. It is also the only structure on the inventory constructed with whipsawn lumber. About 15 × 20 feet in dimension, it has two rooms on the first floor, a half story sleeping loft, a gable front, and overhanging roof. Chinese miners made up almost half the population of this region during the late 1800s but suppression forced most to move to Chinatowns on the west coast. Few records exist of most of them, but there are many documents about Polly, making her home and experience significant.

It is now part of the 26 acres (11 ha) non-profit Polly Bemis Ranch.

The home of Klinkhammer and Shepp is now a guest ranch known as Shepp Ranch.

== See also ==
- National Register of Historic Places listings in Idaho County, Idaho
