= Robyn Rodriguez =

American orientalist

Robyn Magalit Rodriguez
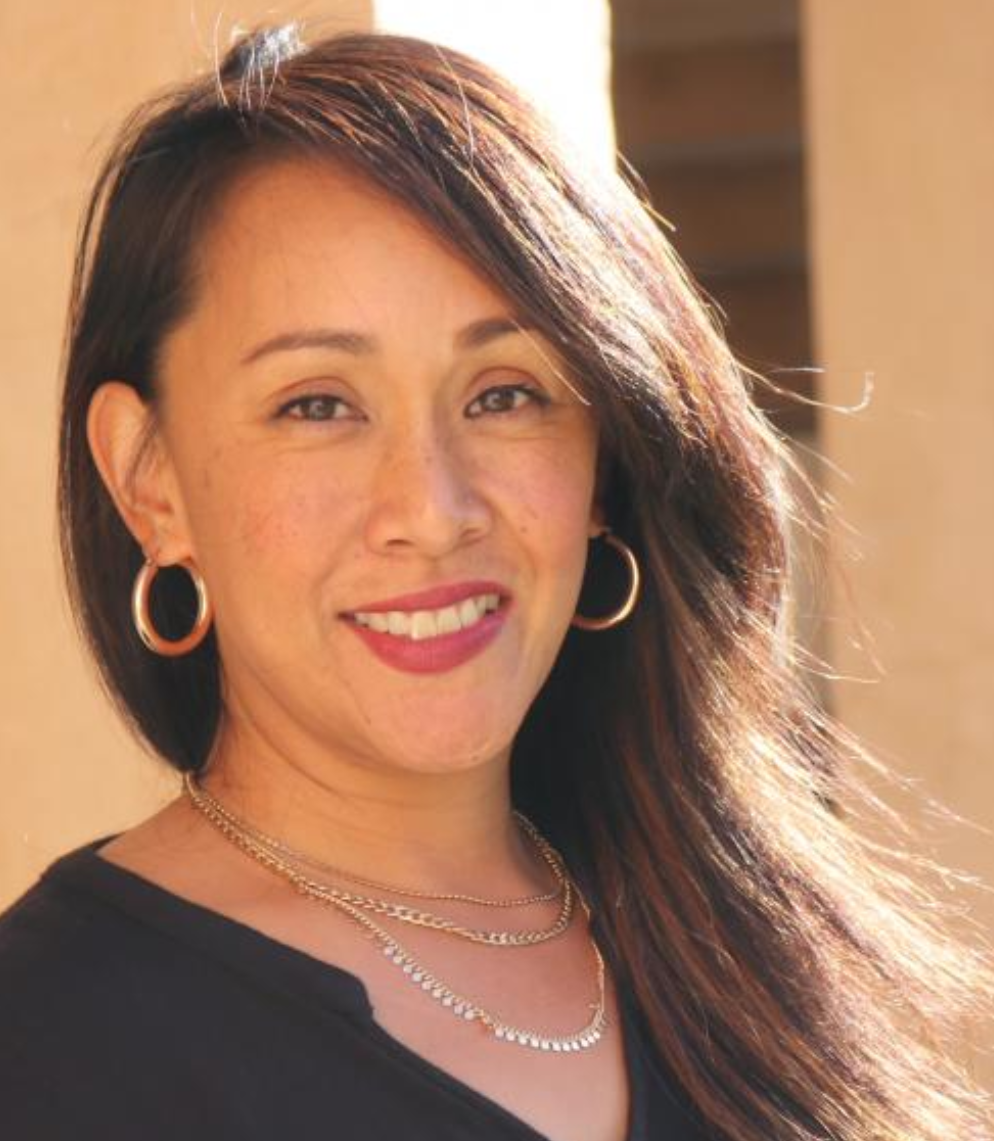
- Rodriguez in 2020
- Occupation: Academic at U.C. Davis (formerly at Rutgers University)

Robyn Magalit Rodriguez is a Filipina American professor, author, and activist. She is currently the chair of the Department of Asian American Studies at the University of California, Davis. In 2018, Rodriguez founded the Bulosan Center for Filipino Studies; which is noted to be the first Filipino Studies center in the United States. She is a former associate professor at Rutgers University.

== Biography ==
Rodriguez received her BA at the University of California, Santa Barbara in 1996, and her MA (1999) and PhD (2005) from the University of California, Berkeley all in sociology. Before coming to UC Davis in 2010, she was a visiting lecturer at Ateneo de Manila University, visiting professor at University of Kassel, and associate professor at Rutgers University from 2005-2010.

Rodriguez has been an ongoing proponent of implementing Ethnic studies as a California high school requirement. In response to recent criticisms of the proposed curriculum being non-representative of all groups, Rodriguez responded stating, "Ethnic studies as a name is kind of a misnomer. What we’re really contending with is race, the various kinds of inequality and exploitation for non-white people of color."

=== Bulosan Center for Filipino Studies ===
In 2018, Rodriguez founded the Bulosan Center for Filipino Studies, named after the Filipino-American author Carlos Bulosan, best known for his book America Is in the Heart. In October 2019, the foundation obtained $1,000,000 from the State of California with primary support from Assemblyman Rob Bonta. In a press conference, Bonta expressed hopes that the sum be a "down payment" for ongoing funding. The funding is intended to contribute to graduate student fellowships and ongoing and upcoming research initiatives. The center hosts an annual research conference every May.

The "Welga! Digital Archive" is an ongoing project documenting and preserving the contributions of Filipino-Americans, including Philip Vera Cruz, in the Delano grape strike.

The center is planning to conduct a national survey on Filipino-American health and well-being.

== Bibliography ==
- Migrants for Export: How the Philippine State Brokers Labor to the World (2010), University of Minnesota Press. ISBN 0816665281
- Asian-America: Sociological and Interdisciplinary Perspectives (2014), UK Polity Press. ISBN 0745647049
- In Lady Liberty's Shadow The Politics of Race and Immigration in New Jersey (2017), Rutgers University Press. ISBN 0813570085
