= Roger Buckley =

US historian and novelist (1937–2020)

Roger N. Buckley
- Born: 1937; New York City, US
- Died: July 25, 2020 (aged 82–83)
- Occupations: Professor of History and Asian American Studies

Academic background
- Education: McGill University (PhD); Hunter College (M.A.); St. John's University (B.A.)

Academic work
- Discipline: History, Asian American Studies
- Institutions: University of Connecticut

Roger Norman Buckley (1937 – July 15, 2020) was an American academic who served as Professor of History and founding director of the Asian American Studies Institute at the University of Connecticut. He authored many scholarly monographs and journal articles, along with several novels.

== Biography ==
Buckley was born in 1937 in New York City, United States, and grew up in Queens. His mother, Elaine, was from Trinidad with Cuban and South Asian heritage. His father, Ralph Buckley, was from Jamaica with Irish heritage. In 1940, his father worked as a shipping clerk and his mother as a factory worker.

Buckley earned his bachelor's degree from St. John's University, his master's degree from Hunter College, and his doctorate in history from McGill University in 1975. Prior to pursuing his doctorate, he taught high school and community college and ran summer youth enrichment programs in New York. After earning his doctorate, he remained in Canada to become a professor and chair of the social studies program at Vanier College in Montreal. In 1980, Buckley returned to the United States, joining the University of Hartford as director of the African American Studies program.

In 1984, Buckley joined the University of Connecticut to lead the Center for Academic Programs and teach in the history department. From 1993 to 2008, Buckley served as founding director of the Asian American Studies Institute. During his tenure, the Institute achieved a national profile and "pioneered the creation of an anti-racist, transnational, and interdisciplinary curriculum." Under his leadership, the Asian American Institute offered specialized courses in Asian American studies, including history, literature and the arts, and political science. It hosted seminars and conferences, including a high-profile Filipino American studies conference and a pivotal gathering of the East of California group of Asian Americanists. The Institute co-founded the Nazrul Endowment Program to fund lectures, arts programs, and human rights initiatives in honor of Kazi Nazrul Islam. The Roger N. Buckley Award Endowment Fund provides scholarships to undergraduates interested in Asian history or Asian American studies. Buckley also facilitated the acquisition of Fred Ho's papers, held in the University of Connecticut's Archives and Special Collections.

Buckley described himself as a historian of war and society. Rather than focusing on battlefield conflict, his works explored social, cultural, and racial dimensions of war and military service. Between 1997 and 2016, he wrote a historical fiction trilogy, "Accommodation and Resistance: Three Who Chose Rebellion," in which he unpacked issues of race, culture, nationality, and politics in the British Army of the nineteenth century through fictionalized portrayals of three British soldiers, each a real-life historical figure: a Black African, an Indian Hindu, and an Irish Catholic.

Buckley also penned mystery-thriller novels featuring fictional McGill University history professor and ladies' man Relph Coggins. Kirkus Reviews reviewed and praised one of these novels.

Buckley received fellowships from the National Endowment for the Humanities, American Council of Learned Societies, John Carter Brown Library at Brown University, Social Sciences and Humanities Research Council of Canada, Sir William Osler Medical Library at McGill, and the University of Connecticut.

Buckley was a resident of Coventry, Connecticut. He was a frequent guest speaker at Windham High School. He died on July 25, 2020.

== Publications ==
=== Scholarly books ===
- Slaves in Red Coats: The British West India Regiments, 1795-1815 (Yale University Press, 1979)
- Editor, The Haitian Journal of Lieutenant Howard, York Hussars, 1796-1798 (University of Tennessee Press, 1985)
- Editor, The Napoleonic War Journal of Captain Thomas Henry Browne, 1807-1816 (Bodley Head for the British Army Records Society, 1987)
- The British Army in the West Indies: Society and the Military in the Revolutionary Age (University Press of Florida, 1998)
- Co-editor with Tamara Roberts, Yellow Power, Yellow Soul: The Radical Art of Fred Ho (University of Illinois Press, 2013)

=== Novels ===
- Congo Jack (Pinto Press, 1997)
- I, Hanuman (Writers Workshop, Kolkata, India, 2003)
- Fort Gorges, Maine: A Relph Coggins Mystery (University Press of the South, 2008)
- Gandhi Forever: A Relph Coggins Mystery (University Press of the South, 2012)
- Sepoy O’Connor (Writers Workshop, Kolkata, India, 2016)

=== Articles and book chapters ===
- "Slave or Freedman: The Question of the Legal Status of the British West India Soldier, 1795–1807", Caribbean Studies, 17, nos. 3-4 (1977–1978), 83–113
- “The Destruction of the British Army in the West Indies, 1793-1815: A Medical History", Journal of the Society for Army Historical Research, 56, no. 226 (1978), 79–94
- "'Black Man' — The Mutiny of the 8th (British) West India Regiment: A Microcosm of War and Slavery in the Caribbean", Jamaican Historical Review, 12 (1980), 52–74
- "The Frontier in the Jamaican Caricatures of Abraham James", Yale University Library Gazette, 58, nos. 3-4 (1984), 152–162
- "The Admission of Slave Testimony at British Military Courts in the West Indies, 1801–1809", in Gaspar and Geggus, eds, A Turbulent Time: The French Revolution in the Greater Caribbean (Indiana University Press, 1997), 226–250
