= Chinatown, Boise, Idaho =

Ethnic enclave in Boise, Idaho

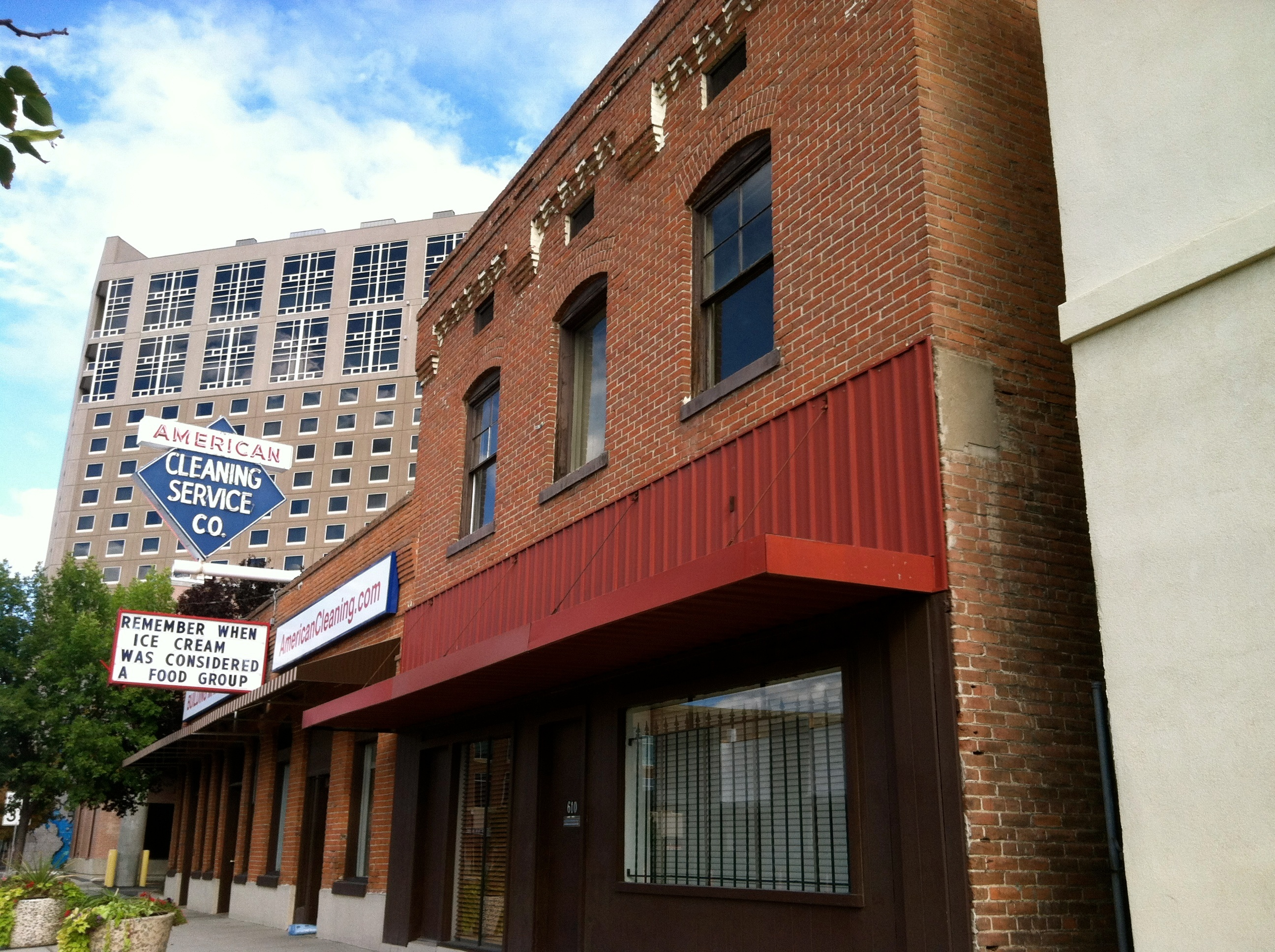
Chinese Odd Fellows Building, 610-612 Front Street, Boise, Idaho, USA. Designed by Tourtellotte & Hummel/Clifton & Corbridge, 1911–1912.

The historic Chinatown in downtown Boise, Idaho, existed around the 1870s to 1960s. The area was located along Idaho Street, and east from 8th Street along Front Street and Grove Street. Over the years, Boise's Chinatown consisted of multiple Chinese owned residencies and businesses including restaurants, merchandise stores, laundries, two herbal medicine shops operated by three generations of the Ah-Fong family, a Chinese Masonic Hall, and a Hip Sing Tong and Hop Sing Tong.

Early immigrants to Boise's Chinatown were mainly from six districts in the Guangdong Province in China (previously romanized as "Kwangtung" Province). It is unknown how many people of Chinese origin or descent lived in Boise's Chinatown over the years. In the U.S. 1870 Census, 78 Chinese people lived in Ada County, where Boise sits, out of a population of 2675. The Chinese population in Boise peaked in 1910 at 255 before declining.

Around 1901, the city condemned wooden Chinatown buildings along Idaho Street for being fire-prone. By the 1960s, most Chinese residents moved (or were forced) out of the Boise Chinatown's core. Urban renewal is blamed for the final destruction of Boise's Chinatown. Using eminent domain, the Boise Redevelopment Agency claimed and subsequently demolished seven downtown city blocks between 1968 and 1971, this included nearly all of Boise's Chinatown. The Chinese Odd Fellows Building is one of the last surviving buildings and is listed on the National Register of Historic Places.

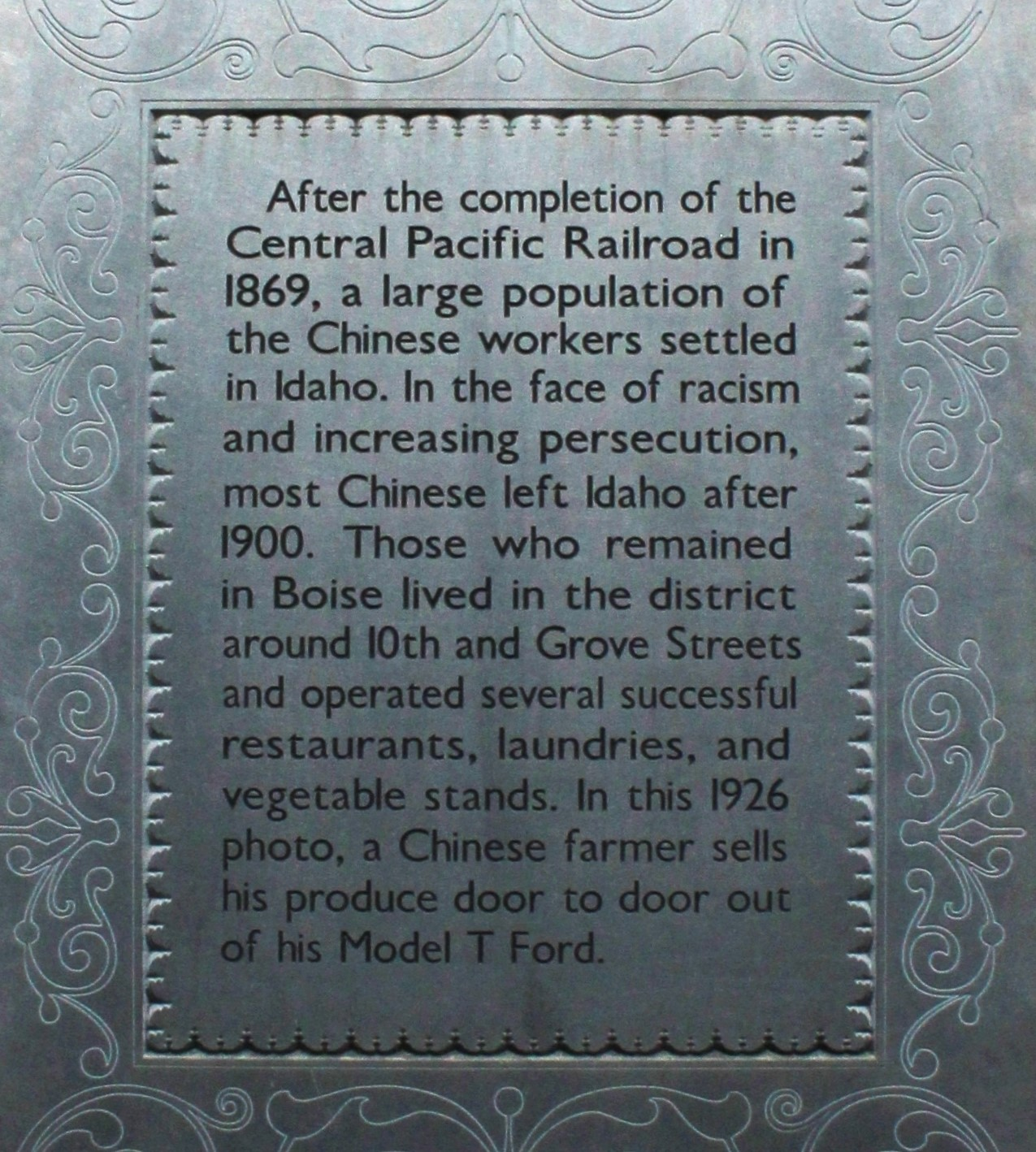
Reference to Boise's Chinatown in Grove Street Illuminated & Boise Canal (2003) by Amy Westover

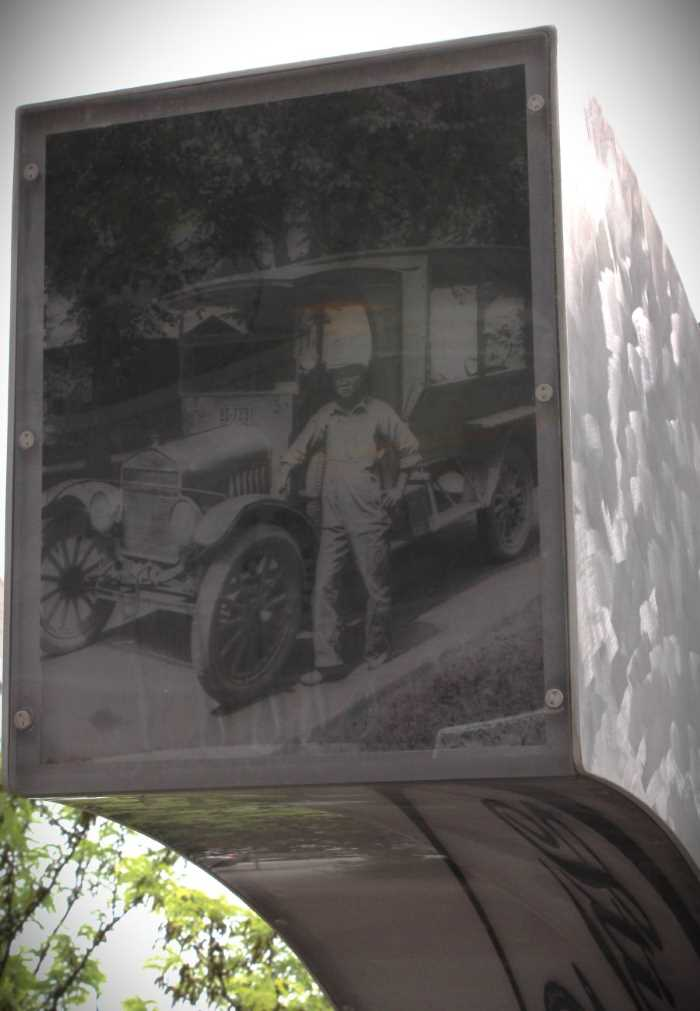
Grove Street Illuminated & Boise Canal (2003) image of a man selling produce from a Model T Ford in 1927

In 2001, Boise City funded Dwaine Carver's Historical Sight: Boise China, which consisted of three red viewers that featured images of Boise's Chinatown. The viewers were located on Grove Plaza, Capitol & Front Street, and Capitol & Grove Street. Another public artwork, Grove Street Illuminated & Boise Canal (2003) by Amy Westover, references the Chinatown History of Boise.

Residents and families of residents were originally buried in the Morris Hill Cemetery in Boise and the Chinese Cemetery near Warren, Idaho.

== Notable residents ==
- Dr. Ah Fong Chuck (aka C. K. Ah-Fong) was born on October 5, 1844/1845 in Chun Sin, Guangdong and practiced medicine in Boise. Ah Fong Chuck graduated from Kung Guh Medical College in 1867. He and his father, Whey Fong, (also a physician), emigrated to San Francisco before moving to Boise in 1889. "He was the only traditional Chinese herb doctor in Idaho to be licensed as a physician or surgeon" and "had a substantial non-Chinese clientele in the Boise area." His son and grandson, Herbert and Gerald Ah Fong, continued the practice. Gerald practiced in Boise's Chinatown until 1964. Their two stores were located on the corner of Capital Boulevard and Idaho Street near the Idaho State Capital.
- Billy Fong was the last reported resident of Boise's Chinatown at the age of 84. He lived in an upstairs apartment of the Hop Sing Tong Building for thirty years. He refused to leave his residence until the day before demolition began, drawing regional media attention.

== See also ==
- C.K. Ah Fong biographical image from the Idaho State Historical Society Ethnic History.
- History of Chinese Americans in Idaho
