= Jerry Kang =

Korean-American legal scholar (born 1968)

- Born: South Korea
- Education: Harvard University; Harvard Law School
- Occupations: Legal scholar, academic administrator

Jerry Kang (born 1968) is a South Korean-born American legal scholar and academic administrator. He is a Professor of Law at the UCLA School of Law, where he also taught Asian American Studies. Since 2015, he has served as is UCLA's first vice chancellor for equity, diversity, and inclusion.

== Early life ==
Kang was born in South Korea. He graduated from Harvard University, where he earned a bachelor of arts in 1990. He went on to earn a juris doctor from the Harvard Law School in 1993. He was a supervising editor of the Harvard Law Review, and he also served as Special Assistant to Harvard University's Advisory Committee on Free Speech.

== Career ==
Kang joined the UCLA School of Law in 1995. He is a founding member of the Critical Race Studies program at UCLA Law and was previously the Korea Times-Hankook Ilbo Endowed Chair for Law and Korean American Studies at UCLA. He teaches courses in both law and Asian American Studies, and has published research about the Internment of Japanese Americans during World War II.

Kang was appointed as UCLA's first vice chancellor for equity, diversity and inclusion on July 1, 2015. In this role, Kang was involved with growing the Discrimination Prevention office and the Title IX office. Kang also established BruinX, a think tank aimed at ensuring greater diversity in UCLA's faculty hiring. Kang stepped down from this role on June 30, 2020, following the end of his five-year term.

Kang earned $354,900 in 2015 and $444,234.00 in 2016.

On October 29, 2021, President Joe Biden nominated Kang to be a member of the National Council on the Humanities within the National Endowment for the Humanities.
