= Glenda Gates Riley =

American historian (born 1938)

Glenda Gates Riley (born September 6, 1938) is an American historian and educator best known for her works on women's history and women in the American West. She was Alexander M. Bracken Professor of History at Ball State University in Muncie, Indiana from 1991 until she retired in 2003.

== Early life and education ==
Glenda Gates Riley was born in Columbus, Ohio, on September 6, 1938, to George F. Gates and Lillian B. (Knafels) Gates. She began her educational career at Western Reserve University where she earned her B.A. in 1960, moving on to earn her M.A. at Miami University in Oxford, Ohio in 1963 and her Ph.D. at Ohio State University in Columbus, Ohio in 1967.

== Academic career ==
Riley began her working career as a history instructor at Denison University from 1967 to 1968, and then acted as visiting assistant professor at Ohio State University from 1968 to 1969. In 1969 Glenda Riley accepted a position at the University of Northern Iowa(UNI) where she taught the first Women's history course in 1972 and later co-designed the first Women's studies program and served as Director of Women's Studies at UNI. During her appointment at UNI, Riley served on multiple historical advisory boards and became the first woman to receive a Distinguished Scholar Award at UNI and was inducted into the Iowa Women's Hall of Fame in 1990. Glenda Riley in 1991 accepted an appointment as Alexander M. Bracken History Professor at Ball State University where she remained until her retirement in 2003.

== Writings ==
Glenda Riley provided significant contributions to the history of women in the American West which included works such as Frontierswomen: The Iowa Experience (1981), Women and Indians on the Frontier, 1825-1915 (1984), and Taking Land, Breaking Land: Women Colonizing the American West and Kenya, 1840-1940 (2003). In a historical field previously centered on the white, Anglo-American male's perspective and experience, Glenda Gates Riley led the inclusion of women's experiences in the American West. While primarily focusing on the letters and writing of white women, and later delving into more diverse representations, she influenced a new perspective of the common female's experience and role in shaping the frontier culturally and politically.

Riley's Frontierswomen: The Iowa Experience (1981) brought national attention to Iowa women and received a Distinguished Achievement Award from the Iowa State Historical Society. Riley utilizes diary entries, letters, and other personal documents alongside secondary sources to obtain understanding of the Iowa woman's experience on the frontier from 1830 to 1870. This work placed importance on the history of the Iowan women's experience on the frontier, the farm women contributing to the Iowa settler culture and settlement of the West. Her writing included the common women of the Great Plains, in a grassroots historiography sense, and concluded that these women were as strong-minded as the more attended to histories of female leaders on the Iowa frontier.

Women and Indians on the Frontier, 1825-1915 (1984) worked to understand western settlement through the perspectives of gender, race, and class, becoming one of the first works in this particular study. Glenda Riley investigated how the frontierswomen's experience changed preconceived notions of the Indian and utilized personal primary sources such as letters and diary entries to gain an understanding of the common woman's experience. Riley observed how ideologies shaped white men's and women's attitudes toward Indians, and how later interactions modified and reformed these projected images. Colonialist gender roles led white women to discern a certain humanity visible within these 'savages' of which white men were incapable through a set image of the Indian created before they ventured into the frontier. Some criticisms of this book center on the lack of investigation given to the Indian side, as the title refers to the white women's views of Indians, and more explanation of the American West being experienced. Riley, however, remained loyal to her interests and created a narrative focused on the woman's experience on the frontier.

Glenda Riley's Taking Land, Breaking Land: Women Colonizing the American West and Kenya, 1840-1940 (2003) continued her work on gender and race shaping the frontier experience and conquest of the landscape. While separated by many miles, in different times, and interacting with different ethnic groups, Riley formed an argument focused on parallels experienced by colonial, white women in spreading their 'civilized' culture. Certain similarities Riley addressed include philosophical views such as “manifest destiny” and imperialism, both believing in this sphere of superiority and civilizing to save. This view of the frontier as philosophy comprised one of four themes representing the structure of this book, the others being the frontier as place, process, and product. She notated "white settlers saw 'empty' land as theirs for the taking. Because whites tended to see progress as linear, only the increasing use of land meant they were going forward." Riley continued to build upon the complexity of women and gender roles on the political and cultural development of the frontier which comprises much of her work.

== Selected works ==
- Frontierswomen, The Iowa Experience (1981) ISBN 9780813814711
- Women and Indians on the Frontier, 1825-1915 (1984) ISBN 9780826307804
- The Female Frontier: A Comparative View of Woman on the Prairie and the Plains (1988) ISBN 9780700604241
- Cities on the Cedar: A Portrait of Cedar Falls, Waterloo, and Black Hawk County (1988) ISBN 9780931209505
- Divorce: An American Tradition (1991) ISBN 9780803289697
- A Place to Grow: Women in the American West (1992) ISBN 9780882958866
- The Life and Legacy of Annie Oakley (1994) ISBN 9780806126562
- Inventing the American Women: An Inclusive History, Volume 1: To 1877 (1995) ISBN 9780882952505
- Building and Breaking Families in the American West (1996) ISBN 9780826317193
- Taking Land, Breaking Land: Women Colonizing the American West and Kenya, 1840-1940 (2003) ISBN 9780826331113
- Confronting Race: Women and Indians on the Frontier, 1815-1915 (2004) ISBN 9780826336255
- Inventing the American Woman: An Inclusive History, Volume 2: Since 1877 (2007) ISBN 9780882952512
- Inventing the American Woman, Volume 1: To 1877: An Inclusive History (2007) ISBN 9780882959573
