= James O'Meara (journalist) =

American journalist

James O'Meara (Jun 1825-Jan 1903) was a journalist who served as editor of several of the U.S. state of Oregon's leading newspapers in the late 1800s, many of which were secessionist Democratic papers.

The papers he edited include the Democratic Standard, the Southern Oregon Gazette, the Oregon State Democrat, the Eugene Register, the States Rights Democrat, Portland Bulletin (~1868-1872), and the Portland News (1886)

In 1858 and 1866 he ran for state printer as a Democrat, losing in 1886 to Republican W. McPherson.

He retired from editing newspapers in 1889, and began publishing historical articles, including "An Early Steamboating Era on the Willamette," published in the Oregonian Jan. 15, 1891 and republished decades later in the Oregon Historical Quarterly.
