= Him Mark Lai =

American historian and writer (1925–2009)

- 麥禮謙
- Born: November 1, 1925; San Francisco, California, US
- Died: May 21, 2009 (aged 83); San Francisco, California, US
- Education: University of California, Berkeley
- Occupations: Historian; mechanical engineer
- Website: himmarklai.org

Him Mark Lai (Chinese: 麥禮謙; Jyutping: mak6 lai5 him1; pinyin: Mài Lǐqiān; November 1, 1925 – May 21, 2009) was an American historian and writer. He contributed to Chinese American historiography. Lai "rescued, collected, catalogued, preserved and shared" historical sources in Chinese and English. He was known as the "Dean of Chinese American history" by his academic peers, despite the fact that he was professionally trained as a mechanical engineer with no advanced training in the academic field of history. The Chronicle of Higher Education named Lai "the scholar who legitimized the study of Chinese America".

== Early life ==
Lai was born in San Francisco, California on November 1, 1925, to Chinese immigrants. At the age of five, Lai attended Chinese school at San Francisco Chinatown's Nom Kue School. Early in his life, Lai showed great aptitude for history. In high school, Lai won first prize at a San Francisco citywide history contest. He attended first in City College of San Francisco for two years and later, he obtained a Bachelor of Science degree in mechanical engineering at the University of California, Berkeley in 1947. In the 1960s, Lai began taking night courses in history at the University of California, Berkeley's extension program. Inspired by his instructor Stanford Lyman, Lai started to pursue research in Chinese American history. As a community activist, Lai joined the Chinese American Democratic Youth League, or Mun Ching, where he met Laura Jung, whom he eventually married in 1953. In 1963, Lai joined the Chinese Historical Society of America, and there he began to accumulate research on Chinese American history. Lai has also curated several exhibits, and taught courses in Chinese American history at San Francisco State University, University of California, Berkeley and City College of San Francisco.

== Education ==
- Nam Kue School, San Francisco Chinatown
- Commodore Stockton Elementary School
- Francisco Junior High School (Francisco Middle School)
- Galileo High School
- 1945 Class valedictorian City College of San Francisco
- 1947 BS in mechanical engineering UC Berkeley

== Life ==
Him Mark Lai was a mechanical engineer at Bechtel Power Corporation from 1953 to 1984.

Lai was not satisfied with the ways the Chinese American experience had been depicted in mainstream history writing, and so he collaborated with Thomas Chinn and Philip Choy to publish A History of the Chinese in California: A Syllabus, in 1969. With Philip Choy, Lai also wrote History of the Chinese in America: An Outline, in 1972. Lai and Choy used this piece as the foundation to co-teach a course at San Francisco State University in 1969 and also taught the same course at UC Berkeley's Ethnic Studies Department in the 1970s. This course became the basis for understanding the Chinese American experience and agenda for pursuing further research.

In 1973, Lai joined the Chinese Culture Center in San Francisco in order to use his historical knowledge to serve the community. Lai developed an exhibit for the Chinese Culture Center titled Two Centuries of Struggle and Achievement: The Chinese of America 1685- 1980, which eventually traveled to China. In 1984, Lai retired from his work as a mechanical engineer at the Bechtel Corporation in order to concentrate full-time on his historical research. Through extensive research of historical sources, Lai was able to create two compilations- Chinese Newspapers Published in North America, 1854- 1975 with Karl Lo (1977) and A History Reclaimed: An Annotated Bibliography of Chinese Language Materials on the Chinese of America (1986). These can be accessed in the special Him Mark Lai collection in the Asian American Studies Library of Ethnic Studies at the University of California, Berkeley. Beginning in 1987, Lai began publishing a journal series entitled Chinese America: History and Perspectives. Lai has served on board and three times as President of the Chinese Historical Society of America and on board and chair of the Chinese Culture Foundation of San Francisco.

Him Mark Lai's most well-known work is "Island: Poetry and History of Chinese Immigrants on Angel Island, 1910–1940", written in conjunction with Judy Yung and Genny Lim. These three formed the History of Chinese Detained on Island Project (HOC-DOI) to translate the Chinese poetry found on the walls of the Angel Island Immigration Station and to collect oral histories of detainees on Angel Island, based on the specific restrictions of the 1882 Chinese Exclusion Act. Their resulting manuscript was independently published in 1980, and published by University of Washington Press in 1991. Lai joked to a newspaper reporter that "that book is the only one that makes [him] any money."

In 1991 Him Mark Lai and Albert Cheng created the In Search of Roots Program through a partnership with the Chinese Historical Society of America, Chinese Culture Foundation, and the Overseas Chinese Affairs Office from Guangdong, China. This year-long program trains a dozen Chinese American youths how to research their family history through National Archives and Records Administration documents and oral history during the Spring. Each Summer, the students visit their ancestral villages in the Pearl River Delta region of China. Upon their return, the students create a visual display of their genealogy and display it at the Chinese Culture Center during Lunar New Year.

In 2003, the Ethnic Studies Library at UC Berkeley announced their "Him Mark Lai Collection," over 200 feet (61 m) of Lai's private research material, which he donated to the library for use by other scholars.

In 2004, Lai published a seminal study on key organizations and institutions in Chinese America, entitled Becoming Chinese American: A History of Communities and Institutions. Lai became an influential leader of the Chinese Historical Society of America by hosting periodical conferences and publishing volumes of collected research.

In 2007, Him Mark Lai was diagnosed with terminal bladder cancer, yet he continued his research and writing. Lai died at his home on May 21, 2009. He was 83. The cause was complications of cancer, according to his wife, Laura. After his death his work remained the core of the curriculum for Roots: Him Mark Lai Family History project.

The UCLA Asian American Center Press announced plans to publish his autobiography in 2009 or 2010, co-edited by Ruthanne Lum McCunn, Judy Yung, and Russell C. Leong. In 2010 the San Francisco Public Library Commission voted to rename its Chinatown branch after Lai.

== Organizations ==
Him Mark Lai was what Albert Lowe calls a "stealth organizer," who was involved in progressive organizations throughout his life, strategically disguised as an interested researcher and scholar, and did not face the same community popularity or governmental scrutiny as higher profile Asian American activists of his era, such as Grace Lee Boggs and Yuri Kochiyama. Nevertheless, he was investigated by the FBI for his activities in "Chinese American Democratic Youth League"/"Chinese American Youth Club"/"Min Qing"/"Mun Ching", a progressive group in San Francisco, as depicted in the 1980 film, The Chinatown Files.

- Chinese League for Peace and Democracy, San Francisco Chapter
- Chung Sai Yat Po, volunteer (1949)
- Min Qing (Mun Ching), (Chinese American Democratic Youth League/Chinese American Youth Club), President (1951–1959)
- Chinese Historical Society of America (CHSA) (1963–2009)
- East/West: The Chinese American weekly (1967)
- Chinese Culture Center of San Francisco (CCC)
- Chinese for Affirmative Action
- In Search of Roots Program (1991–2009)

== Publications ==
Articles

- "A Historical Survey of Organizations of the Left Among the Chinese in America," Bulletin of Concerned Asian Scholars (Fall 1972)
- "A Brief History of the Chinese World" (December 1976)
- "Chinese on the Continental U.S.," Harvard Encyclopedia of American Ethnic Groups
- Encyclopedia of Chinese Overseas and Huaquiao Huaren baike quanshu [Encyclopedia of Chinese and people of Chinese descent overseas]

Manuscripts

- A History of the Chinese in California: A Syllabus (1969)
- Island: Poetry and History of Chinese Immigrants on Angel Island, 1910–1940" (1980)
- A History Reclaimed: An Annotated Bibliography of Chinese Language Materials on the Chinese of America (1986)
- From Overseas Chinese to Chinese American: History of Development of Chinese American Society during the Twentieth Century (1992, written in Chinese)
- Becoming Chinese American: A History of Communities and Institutions (2004)
- Autobiography (forthcoming)

Editor

- Amerasia Journal, editorial committee.
- Chinese America: History & Perspectives, Editor (1987–2009)

== Filmography ==
- The Chinatown Files (2001) (http://www.filmakers.com/index.php?a=filmDetail&filmID=1094)
- Him Mark Lai: The People's Historian (2004)
