= Unbound Feet =

1995 non-fiction book by Judy Yung

- Author: Judy Yung
- Language: English
- Genre: Non-fiction
- Publisher: University of California Press
- Publication date: 1995

Unbound Feet: A Social History of Chinese Women in San Francisco is a 1995 non-fiction book written by Judy Yung and published by University of California Press. The book details the history of immigrant Chinese female population in San Francisco region.
