= Robert V. Hine =

American historian (1921–2015)

Robert Van Norden Hine Jr. (26 April 1921, Los Angeles – 27 March 2015, Irvine, California) was an American memoirist, historical novelist, and history professor who wrote several books. His 1993 memoir Second Sight recounts his experience of becoming blind at age 50 and partially recovering his sight 15 years later with the benefit of a high-risk operation.

He grew up in Beverly Hills, where his father was a real estate developer. In high school, Robert V. Hine developed severe juvenile rheumatoid arthritis. He was hospitalized for six weeks to undergo intensive therapy but graduated on schedule from high school. He started college at the University of California, Los Angeles (UCLA) but withdrew after he began to have hemorrhages in both eyes. The hemorrhages resulted from uveitis caused by his rheumatoid arthritis. As he grew older, the uveitis made removing his cataracts too risky. He earned a bachelor's degree in 1948 from Pomona College and a Ph.D. in history in 1952 from Yale University. 1949 as a graduate student, he married Shirley McChord (1920–1996), whom he had met when they were students at UCLA. As his eyesight deteriorated, she became his reader and research assistant. After graduating from Yale he published in 1953 his first book and spent a year as a fellow at the Huntington Library in San Marino, California. From 1954 to 1990 he was a faculty member of the history department of the University of California, Riverside. There he was the chair of the department from 1962 to 1967. He was a Guggenheim Fellow for the academic years 1957–1958 and 1967–1968.

For fifteen years, from 1970 to 1986, he was blind, but actively continued his teaching and research, and on the restoration of his sight through surgery, he wrote Second Sight, a first-hand account of his journey through blindness.

Hine put lecture notes in Braille on index cards he kept in his pocket and was so adept at fingering them that many students believed he had memorized his talks. For his large lecture classes, he made a seating chart in Braille that allowed him to call on individual students by name as long as they sat in their assigned seats. He also kept his classes lively with a multimedia approach that was novel for the time. A friend with dramatic flair recorded quotations from Jedediah Smith, Black Elk, and other historical figures that Hine combined with slides and music for a Ken Burns-like documentary approach to history. Hine was so skillful at assembling the presentations that a colleague dubbed him the "Cecil B. DeMille of our department."

Upon his death in 2015, he was survived by a daughter and a grandson.

== Selected publications ==
- California's Utopian Colonies. 1953. "continuously in print to this day" Hine, Robert V. (1983). 1983 pbk edition. University of California Press. ISBN 9780520048850.
- Edward Kern and American Expansion. 1962.
- Bartlett's West: Drawing the Mexican Boundary. 1968.
- The American West: An Interpretive History. 1973., 2d ed. 1984
- Community on the American Frontier: Separate but Not Alone. 1980.
- California Utopianism: Contemplations of Eden. 1981.
- In the Shadow of Frémont. 1982.
- Josiah Royce: From Grass Valley to Harvard. 1992.
- Second Sight. University of California Press. 1993. ISBN 978-0-520-08195-6; 203 pages
- with John Mack Faragher: Hine, Robert V.; Faragher, John Mack (2000). The American West: A New Interpretive History. Yale University Press. ISBN 0300078331.
- Hine, Robert V. (2006). Broken Glass: A Family's Journey Through Mental Illness. UNM Press. ISBN 9780826339973.
- with John Mack Faragher: Frontiers: A Short History of the American West. Yale University Press. 2007. ISBN 978-0-300-11710-3.
- Dynamite and Dreams: A Novel Based on the Life of Job Harriman. San Diego City Works Press. 2008. ISBN 978-0-9816020-1-1.
- I Have Seen the Fire: A Novel Inspired by the Life of Sarah Royce. UNM Press. 2008. ISBN 978-0-8263-4317-8.
