= Ruthanne Lum McCunn =

American novelist

Ruthanne Lum McCunn (Chinese: 林露德; pinyin: Lín Lùdé) (née Drysdale; born February 21, 1946) is an American novelist and editor of Chinese and Scottish descent.

== Early life ==
Ruthanne Lum McCunn was born as Roxey Drysdale on February 21, 1946, in Chinatown, San Francisco and raised in Hong Kong. Her father was a Scottish American merchant seaman from Idaho, and her mother was from Hong Kong. Her parents met in the late 1930s when her mother came to San Francisco with a cousin to visit the World's Fair, where she met Ruthanne's father, fell in love with him and got married. Interracial marriage was illegal in California at the time so they drove to Washington, where a minister, who was a friend of her father's family, married them. For the duration of World War II, they lived in San Francisco's Chinatown.

In 1947, her mother returned to Hong Kong with Ruthanne and her sister, where they lived in Sai Ying Pun. McCunn's first language was Cantonese, and she grew up surrounded by her mother's extended family. When she was six years old, her father returned from sea, and concerned that she could not speak English, placed her in a British school. Her father died in America while she was in Form Five at the King George V School.

At age sixteen, McCunn left for America in 1962, after passing her O Levels. She first arrived in Boise, Idaho, where her sister had already settled with their father's relatives. She then left for Walnut Creek, California, where she lived with a friend of her mother's. For two years, she attended Diablo Valley Junior College, and worked odd jobs from janitor to short-order cook. She then transferred to the University of California, Berkeley, and married Don McCunn at the end of her junior year. They moved to Austin, Texas, where she completed her undergraduate degree in English at the University of Texas at Austin in 1968. McCunn earned her teaching credentials from the University of California, San Francisco when they returned to San Francisco the following year.

== Career ==
McCunn first worked as a librarian and then as a teacher in a Santa Barbara elementary school before she and her husband settled permanently in San Francisco in 1974, where she was an English and bilingual teacher. She continued to teach until 1978, when she decided to write full-time.

She has taught a few terms of creative writing and Asian American literature at the University of San Francisco, Cornell University, and the University of California, Santa Cruz.

Her work has appeared in Zyzzyva. In 1991, her second novel, Thousand Pieces of Gold, was adapted into a film of the same name. McCunn was reportedly unhappy with the adaptation.

She was co-editor with Judy Yung and Russell C. Leong on the Chinese American historian Him Mark Lai's autobiography. It was published by the UCLA Asian American Center Press in 2011.

== Personal life ==
McCunn lives in San Francisco, California, with her husband, Don, and their two cats.

== Works ==
- God of Luck. Soho Press. 2008. ISBN 978-1-56947-518-8.
- Thousand Pieces of Gold. Beacon Press. 2004. ISBN 978-0-8070-8381-9. reprint
- The Moon Pearl. Beacon Press. 2001. ISBN 978-0-8070-8349-9.
- Ruthanne Lum McCunn, ed. (2002). Chinese Proverbs. Illustrator Hu Yong Yi. Chronicle Books. ISBN 978-0-8118-3683-8.
- Sole survivor. Beacon Press. 1999. ISBN 978-0-8070-7139-7.
- Ruthanne Lum McCunn (1998). Pie-Biter. Translator Ellen Lai-shan Yeung, Teresa Mlawer, Illustrator You-shan Tang. Shen's Books. ISBN 978-1-885008-07-7.
- Wooden fish songs. Dutton. 1995. ISBN 978-0-525-93927-6.
- An illustrated history of the Chinese in America. Design Enterprises of San Francisco. 1979.
