= Esther Kim Lee =

American theatre historian (born 1970)

Esther Kim Lee (born 1970) is a theatre historian.

Lee completed her Ph.D. at Ohio State University in 2000, specializing in theatre history, literature, and criticism. Lee's teaching career began at the University of Illinois at Urbana–Champaign, where she spent twelve years. She then joined the University of Maryland, College Park's School of Theatre, Dance, and Performance Studies in December 2012, as an associate professor. In 2018, Lee moved to Duke University and was appointed Frances Hill Fox Professor of Theater Studies in 2023.

Lee has served as editor of the academic journal Theatre Survey, published by the American Society for Theatre Research. In 2023, she won the ASTR Distinguished Scholar Award.
