= John Mack Faragher =

American historian

John Mack Faragher (born Phoenix, Arizona) is an American historian, author, and professor emeritus of history at Yale University. He is known for his influential scholarship on the American West, frontier history, migration, and social change in North America.

== Awards ==
- 1980 Frederick Jackson Turner Award of the Organization of American Historians for Women and Men on the Overland Trail
- 1987 Annual Book Prize, Society for Historians of the Early American Republic for Sugar Creek
- 1993 Los Angeles Times Book Prize for Biography for Daniel Boone
- 1995 Governor's Award, State of Kentucky, for Daniel Boone
- 2001 Caughey Western History Association Prize for the Best Book in Western History, for The American West
- 2000 Western Heritage Award, National Cowboy & Western Heritage Museum, for The American West
- 2017 Norman Neuerburg Award, Historical Society of Southern California, for Eternity Street

== Works ==
- Women and Men on the Overland Trail. Yale University Press. 1979. ISBN 978-0-300-08924-0. (reprint 2001)
- Sugar Creek: Life on the Illinois Prairie. Yale University Press. 1986. ISBN 978-0-300-04263-4. "John Mack Faragher."
- Daniel Boone: The Life and Legend of an American Pioneer. Henry Holt & Company. 1993. ISBN 978-0-8050-3007-5. "John Mack Faragher."
- John Mack Faragher, ed. (1996). The encyclopedia of colonial and revolutionary America. Da Capo Press. ISBN 978-0-306-80687-2. "John Mack Faragher encyclopedia."
- John Mack Faragher, ed. (1998). The American Heritage Encyclopedia of American History. Henry Holt & Company. ISBN 978-0-805-04438-6. "john mack faragher american heritage."
- Robert V. Hine; John Mack Faragher (2000). The American West: A New Interpretive History. Yale University Press. ISBN 978-0-300-07835-0. "John Mack Faragher."
- A Great and Noble Scheme: The Tragic Story of the Expulsion of the French Acadians from their American Homeland. W. W. Norton & Company. 2005. ISBN 978-0-393-05135-3. "John Mack Faragher."
- Robert V. Hine; John Mack Faragher (2007). Frontiers: A Short History of the American West. Yale University Press. ISBN 978-0-300-11710-3.
- Eternity Street: Violence and Justice in Frontier Los Angeles. W. W. Norton & Company. 2016. ISBN 978-0-393-24242-3.
- Robert V. Hine; John Mack Faragher; Jon T. Coleman (2017). The American West: A New Interpretive History. Second Edition. Yale University Press. ISBN 978-0-300-23178-6.
