= Karen Brodine =

American writer

- Born: June 14, 1947; Seattle, Washington
- Died: October 18, 1987 (aged 40); San Francisco, California
- Occupations: Poet, educator, activist, dancer, typesetter
- Notable work: Woman Sitting at the Machine, Thinking (1990)

Karen Harriet Brodine (June 14, 1947 – October 18, 1987) was an American poet, dancer, educator, writer, activist, and typesetter, based in San Francisco and Seattle.

== Early life and education ==
Brodine was born in Seattle and raised in Woodinville, Washington, the daughter of Voltaire (Val) Daniel Brodine and Mary Pierce Brodine. Her parents were teachers; they divorced during her childhood. She studied ballet and modern dance from the age of 5, graduated from Bothell High School in 1965, and graduated from the University of California, Berkeley in 1972 with a degree in dance. She earned a master's degree in creative writing at San Francisco State University in 1974.

== Career ==
Brodine taught dance in California schools after college, and was a dancer and choreographer before knee problems ended her performing career. She worked as a typesetter from 1975 to 1986. She became a poet and a writing teacher in San Francisco, and volunteered with the VISTA program as a literacy teacher in Harlem, New York City. She was a co-founder of the Women Writers Union in San Francisco, and one of the original co-editors at Kelsey Street Press. She was also an editor at the Berkeley Poets Co-op. She held national positions with the Freedom Socialist Party and Radical Women. In 1981, she was one of the poets involved in Mainstream Exiles: A Lesbian and Gay Men's Cultural Festival, an event at Valencia Tool & Die in San Francisco. From 1982 to 1984, she was coordinator of the Merle Woo Defense Committee.

== Publications ==
Brodine wrote four books of poetry, contributed to poetry collections, and edited or designed works by other authors, including Gloria Martin's memoir Socialist Feminism: The First Decade, 1966-1976 (1984).

- Slow Juggling (1975)
- Making the Park (1976, with Susan Griffin, Laura Moriarty, and others)
- Workweek (1977)
- The Messengers (1978)
- Illegal Assembly (1980)
- Woman Sitting at the Machine, Thinking (1990; published posthumously with a preface by Meridel le Sueur, and introduction by Merle Woo)

== Personal life and legacy ==
Brodine married and divorced fellow dancer John T. Daley in the early 1970s; she later identified as a lesbian. She died from breast cancer in 1987, at the age of 40, in San Francisco. Her papers are in the San Francisco Public Library's James C. Hormel LGBTQIA Center. Canadian band Propagandhi quoted a Brodine poem in their song "Letter of Resignation".
