= Peter Kwong (academic) =

Chinese professor and filmmaker

- Born: Peter Chi-Choong Kwong; 1941; Chongqing, China
- Died: March 17, 2017 (aged 75); New York, NY, U.S.
- Occupations: Professor, activist, filmmaker, journalist

Peter Kwong (simplified Chinese: 邝治中; traditional Chinese: 鄺治中; 1941–2017) was a professor of Asian American studies and urban affairs and planning at Hunter College in New York City, as well as a professor of sociology at the Graduate Center of the City University of New York.

== Biography ==
Born in Chongqing, China, he was a pioneer in Asian American studies, a leading scholar of immigration, and an award-winning journalist and filmmaker of Chinese descent. He was widely recognized for his passionate commitment to human rights and social justice. His best known scholarly work is on Chinese Americans and on modern Chinese politics. His books include:

- Chinese America: The Untold Story of America’s Oldest New Community (ISBN 1565849620);
- Chinese Americans: An Immigrant Experience, co-authored with his wife, Chinese historian Dusanka Miscevic. (ISBN 0883631288);
- Forbidden Workers: Illegal Chinese Immigrants and American Labor (ISBN 156584355X);
- The New Chinatown (ISBN 0809015854);
- Chinatown, New York: Labor and Politics, 1930-1950 (ISBN 1565846400).

He was a frequent contributor to The Nation and the International Herald Tribune and wrote a bi-weekly column on Asia, syndicated worldwide by Agence Global. His exposés of Chinese drug syndicates and Los Angeles racial riots were nominated for the Pulitzer Prize. Kwong was also a documentary filmmaker, a recipient of a CINE Golden Eagle Award, and most recently a co-producer of China's Unnatural Disaster: The Tears of Sichuan Province for HBO, which was nominated for an Academy Award in 2010. His 1980 television film, “Third Avenue: Only the Strong Survive,” won an Emmy Award.

== See also ==
- Chinese Americans in New York City
