= Judy Yung =

American librarian and activist (1946–2020)

Judith Yung
- Born: January 25, 1946; San Francisco, California, U.S.
- Died: December 14, 2020 (aged 74); San Francisco, California, U.S.
- Education: San Francisco State University (B.A. 1967); University of California, Berkeley (M.L.S. 1968; Ph.D. 1994)
- Spouse(s): Eddie Fung, 2003-2018
- Scientific career
- Fields: Ethnic Studies
- Workplaces: University of California, Santa Cruz, 1990-2004

Judith Yung (January 25, 1946 – December 14, 2020) was a librarian, community activist, historian, and professor emerita in American Studies at the University of California, Santa Cruz. She specialized in oral history, women's history, and Asian American history. She died on December 14, 2020, in San Francisco, where she had returned in 2018.

== Life ==
Judy Yung was the fifth daughter of six children born to immigrant parents from China. She grew up in San Francisco Chinatown, where her father worked as a janitor and her mother as a seamstress to support the family. Yung was able to acquire a bilingual education by attending both public school and Chinese language school for ten years. She received a B.A. in English Literature and Chinese Language from San Francisco State University in 1967 and a Masters in Library Science from the University of California, Berkeley the next year. Later, she went back to obtain her Ph.D. (1994) in Ethnic Studies from the University of California, Berkeley.

In the late 1960s and early 1970s, Yung worked as librarian for the Chinatown branch of the San Francisco Public Library and later established the first Asian public library in America at the Park Boulevard branch of the Oakland Public Library, pioneering the development of Asian language materials and Asian American interest collections in the public library to better serve the Asian American community. She also spent four years working as associate editor of the East West newspaper.

In 1975, inspired by the discovery of Chinese poetry on the walls of the Angel Island detention barracks, Yung embarked on a research project with Him Mark Lai and Genny Lim to translate the poems and interview former Chinese detainees about their immigration experiences. They self-published Island: Poetry and History of Chinese Immigrants on Angel Island, 1910-1940 in 1980, and a second expanded edition of the book was published by the University of Washington Press in 2014.

From 1981 to 1983, with a federal grant from the Women's Educational Equity Program, Yung directed the Chinese Women of America Research Project, resulting in the first traveling exhibit on the history of Chinese American women and the book, Chinese Women of America: A Pictorial History. She then returned to graduate school to hone her research skills as a historian.

Upon receiving her Ph.D. in Ethnic Studies in 1990, Yung was hired to establish an Asian American Studies program at the University of California, Santa Cruz, where she taught courses in Asian American studies, women's history, oral history, and mixed race until she retired in 2004. She has since devoted her time to writing more books about Chinese American history and serving as a historical consultant with a number of community organizations and film projects.

In 2002, while working on Chinese American Voices, Judy Yung met Eddie Fung, a POW during World War II. They got married a year later and made Santa Cruz their home. After her husband died in 2018, Yung moved back to her hometown San Francisco.

Yung appears in the 2021 documentary The Six, in which she explains the significance of a Chinese poem written by RMS Titanic survivor Fong Wing Sun, and Chinese poetry written by Chinese immigrants while being held at Angel Island in the 1920s and 1930s.

She died on December 14, 2020, of complications from a fall at her home. She was 74 years old.

== Awards ==
- 2015, National Women's History Month Honoree
- 2015, Immigrant Heritage Award in Education, Angel Island Immigration Station Foundation
- 2011, Caughey Western History Association Prize (for Angel Island)
- 2007, Annie Soo Spirit Award, Chinese Historical Society of America
- 2006, Lifetime Achievement Award, Association for Asian American Studies
- 2003, Excellence Through Diversity Award, University of California, Santa Cruz
- 2001, Presidential Recognition Award, Chinese American Librarians Association
- 1999, Excellence in Teaching Award, University of California, Santa Cruz
- 1997, Jeanne Farr McDonnell Book Award (for Unbound Feet), Women's Heritage Museum
- 1996, Robert G. Athearn Book Award (for Unbound Feet), Western History Association
- 1996, National Book Award in History (for Unbound Feet), Association for Asian American Studies
- 1996, Distinguished Award for Culture, Chinese Culture Foundation of San Francisco
- 1987, Outstanding Asian Women of the Year, Asian Women's Resource Center, San Francisco
- 1982, American Book Award (for Island: Poetry and History of Chinese Immigrants on Angel Island, 1910-1940), Before Columbus Foundation
- 1980, Outstanding Citizen Award, Oakland Museum

== Works ==
- Him Mark Lai; Genny Lim; Judy Yung, eds. (1980). Island: Poetry and History of Chinese Immigrants on Angel Island, 1910-1940. Hoc Doi. ISBN 978-0-936434-00-1.
- Chinese Women of America: A Pictorial History. University of Washington Press. 1986. ISBN 0-295-96357-3.
- Unbound Feet: A Social History of Chinese Women in San Francisco. University of California Press. 1995. ISBN 978-0-520-08867-2.
- Unbound Voices: A Documentary History of Chinese women in San Francisco. University of California Press. 1999. ISBN 978-0-520-21860-4. "Judy Yung."
- San Francisco's Chinatown. Arcadia Publishing. 2006. ISBN 0-7385-3130-8.
- Judy Yung; Gordon H. Chang; Him Mark Lai, eds. (2006). Chinese American Voices: From the Gold Rush to the Present. University of California Press. ISBN 978-0-520-24310-1. "Judy Yung."
- The Adventures of Eddie Fung: Chinatown Kid, Texas Cowboy, Prisoner of War. University of Washington Press. 2007. ISBN 978-0-295-98754-5.
- Erika Lee; Judy Yung (2010). Angel Island: Immigrant Gateway to America. Oxford University Press. ISBN 978-0-19-973408-5.
- Judy Yung; Ruthanne Lum McCunn; Russell Leong, eds. (2011). Him Mark Lai: Autobiography of a Chinese American Historian. UCLA Asian American Studies Center and Chinese Historical Society of America. ISBN 978-0-934052-18-4.
- Him Mark Lai; Genny Lim; Judy Yung, eds. (2014). Island: Poetry and History of Chinese Immigrants on Angel Island, 1910-1940, 2nd edition. University of Washington Press. ISBN 978-0-295-99407-9.
- San Francisco's Chinatown. Arcadia Publishing. 2016. ISBN 978-1-4671-1682-4.
