= Thousand Pieces of Gold =

Book by Ruthanne Lum McCunn

- First edition
- Author: Ruthanne Lum McCunn
- Language: English
- Genre: historical novel
- Publication date: 1981
- Publication place: United States
- ISBN: 080708381X

Thousand Pieces of Gold is a 1981 historical novel by Ruthanne Lum McCunn and based on the life of Polly Bemis, a 19th-century Chinese immigrant woman in the American Old West. In 1991, the novel was adapted into a film of the same name.

== Plot ==
Lalu is the daughter of a Chinese farmer. When her father loses everything, Lalu finds herself thrust into debt slavery. Her misfortunes eventually take her to the Pacific Northwest.

== Background ==
McCunn first came across Lalu Nathoy's story when she was researching the lives of Chinese in Idaho for an earlier nonfiction book called An Illustrated History of the Chinese in America:

I came across her story in a book called Idaho Chinese Lore by Sister Alfreda Elsensohn— it included just a few pages about her. But I immediately knew that I wanted to find out more about her and write an entire book about her because she brought out so many things about American history that we don't actually know about, generally, in this country. And also because, to me, she was such an extraordinary person in her own right. There are many people who survive incredible hardships, and she certainly did. But to survive with your capacity for compassion for other people intact and not to turn hard and bitter yourself is, to me, extraordinary. And that was what drew me to her and to want to find out more about her.

McCunn has said that Polly Bemis reminded her of her own great-grandmother who was also born in northern China and sold into slavery. After Thousand Pieces of Gold was published, she learned that her father, who had died when she was a girl, had met Bemis when he was a teenager working summer jobs as a fire watcher in Idaho.
