= List of Korean Americans =

The following is a list of notable Korean Americans, including original immigrants who obtained American citizenship and their American descendants.

To be included in this list, the person must have a Wikipedia article showing they are Korean American or must have references showing they are Korean American and are notable.

== Art and design ==
- Dana Tai Soon Burgess, choreographer, cultural figure
- Richard Chai, fashion designer
- Frank Cho, comic book artist (Spider-Man, The New Avengers), writer, and creator (Liberty Meadows)
- David Choe, abstract artist
- Michael Choi, comic book artist (Witchblade, X-23 and X-Force)
- Doo-Ri Chung, fashion designer
- Peter Chung, animator, creator of cult animated TV series Æon Flux
- CYJO (Cindy Hwang), photographer, "KYOPO project"
- Dennis Hwang, artist, Google doodler, game designer and artist of Pokémon Go
- Derek Kirk Kim, cartoonist and author of critically acclaimed graphic novel Same Difference and Other Stories
- Nic Cha Kim, founder of Gallery Row in Downtown Los Angeles
- Scott Kim, puzzlemaster, artist, computer game designer
- Yu Yeon Kim, curator of art
- Grace La, designer, principal of La Dallman, professor of architecture, Harvard University Graduate School of Design
- Il Lee, artist
- Jae Lee, comic book artist (Namor the Sub-Mariner, Inhumans)
- Jim Lee, best-selling comic book artist (X-Men, Batman, Superman) and co-creator (Gen^{13}, WildC.A.T.s); co-founder of Image Comics; publisher and chief creative officer of DC Comics
- Lela Lee, actress and cartoonist, creator of the comic strip and animated cartoons Kim, the Angry Little Asian Girl and Angry Little Girls
- Jiha Moon, artist
- Nam June Paik, Korean-born artist; father of video art
- Greg Pak, writer, director, actor (Robot Stories)
- Andy Park, comic book artist (Tomb Raider, X-Men)
- Peter Shin, a director of Family Guy
- Peter Sohn, animator at Pixar Animation Studios (The Good Dinosaur, Elemental)
- Amy Sol, contemporary artist based in Las Vegas, Nevada
- Tommy Yune, comic book writer and artist (Speed Racer, Robotech) and animation director (Robotech: The Shadow Chronicles)

== Business ==
- Nelson Chai, investment banker and former CFO of the New York Stock Exchange
- Do Won Chang, founder of Forever 21
- Charlotte Cho, esthetician, author and co-founder of Soko Glam
- Timothy Hwang, founder and CEO of FiscalNote and president of the National Youth Association (NYA)
- Sabrina Kay, founder and chancellor of Fremont College
- David Kim, former CEO of Baja Fresh
- Daniel J. Kim, founder of Red Mango
- James Kim, founder of Amkor
- Jim Kim, founder of venture capital firm Formation 8
- Moon Kook-jin, founder of Kahr Arms, manufacturer of the Desert Eagle
- Brian Lee, co-founder of Legalzoom.com, ShoeDazzle.com, and The Honest Company
- Chong Moon Lee, founder of Diamond Multimedia
- Curtis Lee, founder and CEO of Luxe
- David Lee, real estate developer
- Kewsong Lee, CEO of The Carlyle Group
- Young Lee, co-founder of Pinkberry
- Thai Lee, CEO and president of SHI International, billionaire
- Ilhan New, founder of La Choy
- Jane Park, founder of Julep, cosmetics company
- James Park, founder and CEO of Fitbit
- Sung Won Sohn, professor of economics at California State University, former president of LA Hanmi Bank
- Daewon Song, co-founder of Almost Skateboards
- James Sun, CEO and founder of GeoPage.com; The Apprentice finalist
- Lisa Song Sutton, businesswoman, attorney, former Miss Nevada United States and former congressional candidate
- Gideon Yu, co-owner of the San Francisco 49ers and Executive Chairman and CEO of Bowers & Wilkins
- Richard Yoo, founder and former CEO of Rackspace

== Community leaders and activists ==
- Ahn Changho, early 20th century immigrant community activist and leader, member of Korean independence movement
- Kenneth Bae, imprisoned by North Korea for human rights activity
- Emil J. Kang, non-profit arts administrator, curator, professor. Youngest president and first Asian-American to head a major symphony orchestra. First Korean-American to be nominated by the president of the United States for membership in the National Council on the Arts National Endowment for the Arts
- Angela E. Oh, attorney and social/political activist best known for her role as spokesperson for the Korean American community after the 1992 Los Angeles Riots and her position on President Bill Clinton's One America Initiative
- Park Yong-man, early 20th century immigrant community activist, member of Korean independence movement
- Song Oh-kyun, Korean independence activist (originally from Pyongyang, North Korea)
- Song Yi-kyun, Korean independence activist and aviator (originally from Pyongyang, North Korea)

== Criminals ==
- Seung-Hui Cho, murdered 32 people at Virginia Tech before committing suicide with a gun
- Fullerton Boys, Korean gangsters

== Culinary arts ==
- Danny Bowien, chef and owner of Mission Chinese Food in San Francisco and New York
- David Chang, chef, owner of Momofuku Noodle Bar, Momofuku Ko and Momofuku Ssäm Bar in New York City
- Roy Choi, co-founder and head chef of Kogi Korean BBQ food trucks and restaurants in Los Angeles
- Judy Joo, chef, owner of Jinjuu Restaurant (London and Hong Kong) Iron Chef on Iron Chef UK; judge on Iron Chef America and The Next Iron Chef; host of Korean Food Made Simple Cooking Channel; judge on Kitchen Inferno
- Ann Kim, chef and co-owner of Young Joni and popular pizzerias in Minneapolis, Minnesota
- Beverly Kim, finalist on Top Chef (Season 9); first winner of Top Chef Last Chance Kitchen; chef-owner of Parachute, Chicago, Illinois
- Kristen Kish, winner of Top Chef (Season 10); chef at Stir, Boston, Massachusetts
- Corey Lee, chef-owner of Michelin-starred Benu in San Francisco; former head chef at The French Laundry
- Edward Lee, contestant on Top Chef (season 9); host of television show Culinary Genius
- Maangchi (Emily Kim, 김광숙), author, popularizer of Korean cuisine and its preparation

== Entertainment ==
- Philip Ahn, actor
- Ralph Ahn, actor
- Amy Anderson, stand-up comedian and actress
- Aubrey Anderson-Emmons, actress (Modern Family)
- Fred Armisen, actor, comedian
- Awkwafina, also known as Nora Lum, rapper, actress and comedian of Chinese and Korean descent
- Nicole Bilderback, actress
- Moon Bloodgood, actress
- Johnny Yong Bosch, actor, best known as Adam Park in Power Rangers
- Steve Byrne, comedian, actor
- Theresa Hak Kyung Cha, author, video and filmmaker
- Katie Chang, actress
- Timothy Chang, comedian and actor
- Karen Chee, comedian and comedy writer, Late Night with Seth Meyers
- Arden Cho, actress, (Teen Wolf, KPOP Demon Hunters)
- Henry Cho, comedian and actor
- John Cho, actor born in Seoul, South Korea and raised in Los Angeles, California he appeared in the American Pie franchise and Harold & Kumar Go to White Castle as well as the Star Trek reboot series as Hikaru Sulu; singer for the group Left of zed
- Margaret Cho, comedian, former star of the television sitcom All American Girl
- Smith Cho, actress
- SungWon Cho, actor, voice actor and YouTuber
- Kelly Choi, model, television presenter
- Kenneth Choi, actor
- Justin Chon, actor
- Daniel Chun, writer, co-producer (The Simpsons)
- Charlet Chung, actress and voice actress
- Jamie Chung, actress
- Philip W. Chung, playwright, founder and Artistic Director of Lodestone Theatre Ensemble
- Morena Corwin, model and Playboy playmate
- Piper Curda, actress and singer
- Saylor Curda, actress and singer
- Joy Dietrich, film director
- Michaela Dietz, voice actress (Steven Universe)
- Joanna Gaines, star of Fixer Upper
- Tati Gabrielle, actress
- Jon Gosselin, father of sextuplets; a subject of the reality show Jon & Kate Plus 8
- Mark Fischbach (Markiplier), YouTuber and actor
- Bong Soo Han, "father of American Hapkido"; choreographed and performed in the fight scenes of Billy Jack
- Daniel Henney, model, actor in South Korea
- Gene Hong, producer, writer, and actor on Wild 'N Out
- Chanel Iman, model
- Ken Jeong, comedian, actor
- Grace Jung, comedian, writer and director
- Joseph Kahn, music video and movie director
- Angela Kang, television showrunner, producer, and writer
- Michael Kang, writer/director (The Motel, West 32nd)
- Sung Kang, actor (The Motel, Better Luck Tomorrow, The Fast and the Furious: Tokyo Drift)
- Tim Kang, actor (The Mentalist)
- Alan Kim, actor, youngest nominee for BAFTA Award for Best Actor in a Supporting Role
- Catherine Haena Kim, actress and model
- Daniel Dae Kim, actor
- Evan C. Kim, actor, best known for his role in the 1977 John Landis comedy The Kentucky Fried Movie
- Grace Kim, Playboy playmate
- Irene Kim, model and fashion designer
- Jacqueline Kim, actress
- Randall Duk Kim, actor
- Yunjin Kim, actress
- Esther Ku, comedian
- Yul Kwon, contestant on Survivor: Cook Islands
- Alexander Sebastien Lee, actor, filmmaker
- Alice Lee, actress
- Becky Lee, contestant on Survivor: Cook Islands
- Bobby Lee, comedian, actor, podcaster
- C.S. Lee, actor
- Chris Chan Lee, filmmaker
- Ki Hong Lee, actor (The Maze Runner)
- James Kyson Lee, actor
- Lee Ji-ah, actress
- Justin Lee, actor
- Lela Lee, actress and cartoonist
- Liz Lee, actress, My Life as Liz
- Patricia Ja Lee, actress, best known as Cassie Chan in Power Rangers
- Raymond Lee, actor (Quantum Leap (2022 TV series))
- Rex Lee, actor (Entourage)
- Stephanie Lee, actress and model
- Sung-Hi Lee, model who appears mostly in soft-core nude photoshoots
- Will Yun Lee, actor (Die Another Day)
- Ma Dong-seok, actor
- Charles Melton, actor (Riverdale, The Sun Is Also a Star)
- Mike Moh, actor, martial artist, stuntman (Kamen Rider: Dragon Knight)
- Leonardo Nam, actor
- Ricky Lee Neely, actor
- Soon Hee Newbold, filmmaker, actress, martial artist
- Dennis Oh, actor
- Sandra Oh, actress
- Soon-Tek Oh, actor
- Dennis Joseph O'Neil, model and actor
- Joy Osmanski, actress
- Hettienne Park, actress (Hannibal)
- Ho Sung Pak, actor, Teenage Mutant Ninja Turtles, Liu Kang and Shang Tsung in Mortal Kombat
- Grace Park, actress, Battlestar Galactica
- Joon Park, actor
- Linda Park, Korean-born actress (Enterprise)
- Randall Park, actor (Fresh Off the Boat)
- Soo Joo Park, model
- Steve Park, actor (In Living Color)
- Sydney Park, actress (Spork, Instant Mom, The Walking Dead, Spirit Riding Free, Wish Upon, Lifeline, Pretty Little Liars: The Perfectionists)
- Soon-Yi Previn, actress; wife of Woody Allen; adoptive daughter of Mia Farrow
- Lindsay Price, television actress
- Phillip Rhee, actor (Best of the Best movies), Tae Kwon Do and Hapkido master
- Eddie Shin, actor
- Keong Sim, actor
- Sonja Sohn, actress
- Stephen Sohn, model
- James Sun, first runner-up, The Apprentice 6
- James Sweeney, filmmaker and actor
- Brian Tee, actor (The Fast and the Furious: Tokyo Drift)
- Jenna Ushkowitz, actress and singer (Glee)
- Suzanne Whang, host of HGTV's House Hunters, Polly on NBC's Las Vegas, award-winning stand-up comedian
- Joe Wong, comedian
- Eugene Lee Yang, filmmaker, actor, and co-creator of the online comedy series The Try Guys
- Niki Yang, animator, writer, storyboard artist and voice actress
- Han Ye-seul, actress
- Steven Yeun, actor (The Walking Dead)
- Aaron Yoo, actor (Disturbia)
- Christine Yoo, scriptwriter and director of Wedding Palace
- Ji-young Yoo, actress (Expats)
- Elizabeth Yu, actress
- Johnny Yune, comedian and actor (They Call Me Bruce?)
- Karl Yune, model and actor (Memoirs of a Geisha, Anacondas: The Hunt for the Blood Orchid, brother of Rick Yune)
- Rick Yune, model and actor (Die Another Day, The Fast and the Furious)
- Lee Sung Jin, writer and director
- Lo Mutuc, actoe

== Journalism ==
- Virginia Cha, CNN News anchor
- Juju Chang, ABC News anchor and reporter
- Alina Cho, CNN News correspondent
- Liz Cho, ABC News anchor and reporter
- Sophia Choi, former CNN Headline News anchor, now at KVBC-DT
- Sarah Jeong, journalist specializing in information technology law and other technology-related topics; former member of the editorial board of The New York Times
- Jay Caspian Kang, Vice News Tonight correspondent
- Arnold Kim, founder of MacRumors
- James Kim, former senior editor at CNET
- Lee Ann Kim, anchor and reporter for KGTV; executive director of the San Diego Asian Film Festival
- Lisa Kim, NBC News news anchor for NBC11
- Michael Kim, ESPN anchor
- Seung Min Kim, White House correspondent for The Washington Post
- Mina Kimes, ESPN Journalist
- Kyung Lah, CNN News correspondent
- Jean H. Lee, former Associated Press bureau chief in Seoul and Pyongyang
- Michelle Ye Hee Lee, The Washington Post reporter and current president of the Asian American Journalists Association
- MJ Lee, CNN News political correspondent
- Corina Knoll, Los Angeles Times reporter
- Suchin Pak, MTV News anchor and reporter
- Amara Sohn-Walker, CNN News correspondent
- Eun Yang, NBC4/WRC-TV News anchor and reporter, Washington, DC
- Paula Yoo, journalist, children's and young adult's author, and television screenwriter
- Eunice Yoon, China Bureau Chief and Senior Correspondent for CNBC
- Phil Yu, founder and owner of the Angry Asian Man blog
- Young Jean Lee, New York Times writer

== Law and government ==
- Judge Herbert Choy, appointed to the U.S Court of Appeals for the Ninth Circuit; first Asian American appointed to the federal bench
- Julie J. Chung, diplomat, Acting Assistant Secretary of State for Western Hemisphere Affairs
- Judge Michael Hun Park, United States Court of Appeals for the Second Circuit
- Judge Kenneth K. Lee, United States Court of Appeals for the Ninth Circuit
- Wendy Lee Gramm, former head of the Commodity Futures Trading Commission and the Office of Information and Regulatory Affairs (OIRA); wife of former United States Senator Phil Gramm
- Yumi Hogan, First Lady of the State of Maryland; first Korean American first lady of a U.S. state and the first Asian American first lady in the history of Maryland
- BJ Kang, FBI agent, lead investigator of insider trading case against Raj Rajaratnam
- Young Woo Kang, policy advisor of the National Council on Disability of the US White House in 2001
- Michael Kim, trial lawyer
- Harold Hongju Koh, dean of Yale Law School and former Assistant Secretary of State during the Clinton administration
- Lucy H. Koh, judge, US District Court for the Northern District of California, appointed 2010
- Ronald Moon, Chief Justice of the Hawai'i Supreme Court
- Annabel Park, founder of Coffee Party USA
- Meroe Park, associate deputy director of the Central Intelligence Agency from 2013 to 2017
- John Yoo, Berkeley law professor and former Deputy Attorney General of the United States
- Sung Kim, US Ambassador to the Philippines

=== Elected officials ===
- Martha Choe, city councilmember in Seattle
- John Choi, county attorney of Ramsey County, Minnesota and former Saint Paul City Attorney
- Jun Choi, former mayor of Edison, New Jersey
- Dr. Steven Choi Ph.D, California State Assemblyman, 68th District
- Christopher Chung, the first elected mayor of Palisades Park, New Jersey, where Koreans constitute the majority of the population
- Jake Fitisemanu, member of the Utah House of Representatives (2025–present)
- Helen Gym, member of the Philadelphia City Council (2016-2022), first Asian American woman to be elected to the position in the city
- Mary Hayashi, member of the California State Assembly (2006–2012)
- Soo Hong, Republican member of Georgia's State House of Representatives, first Korean American woman elected to Georgia's General Assembly, representing the 103rd district (2023–present)
- Hoon-Yung Hopgood, member of Michigan State House of Representatives, first Korean American elected to public office in Michigan
- Sukhee Kang, former Mayor of Irvine, California
- Mark L. Keam, member of the Virginia House of Delegates (2010–2022)
- Andy Kim, Democratic United States senator from New Jersey, first Korean American elected in the United States Senate. Former Congressman from New Jersey's 3rd congressional district (2019-2024), US diplomat and national security official
- Harry Kim, former Mayor of Hawaii County
- Jane Kim, Supervisor in San Francisco
- Jay Kim, former Republican Congressman from California (1993-1999), first Korean American elected in the United States Congress
- Patty Kim, State Representative of Pennsylvania
- Ron Kim, first Korean American elected in the New York State Assembly (2013–present)
- Tammy Kim, former Vice Mayor of Irvine, California
- Young Kim, Republican Congresswoman from California's 40th congressional district (2021–present)
- Sylvia Luke, lieutenant governor of Hawaii, first Korean American elected to a statewide office in the U.S.A.
- Dave Min, Democratic Congressman from California's 47th congressional district (2025–present), former state senator for California's 37th senate district (2020–2025)
- David Oh, member of the Philadelphia City Council (2012-2023), first Asian American to be elected to the position in the city
- Sam Park, Democratic member of Georgia's State House of Representatives, first Korean American and the first openly gay person of color elected to Georgia's General Assembly, representing the 101st District (2017–present)
- Maria Robinson, Director of the Grid Deployment Office (2022– 2025), member of Massachusetts House of Representatives, representing the 6th Middlesex District (2019–2022), first Korean-American to be elected to the General Court of Massachusetts
- Cindy Ryu, Washington House of Representatives, first female Korean American Mayor in the United States (Shoreline)
- David Ryu, first Korean American elected to the Los Angeles City Council (2015–2020)
- Paull Shin, former Washington state senator (1999-2014); Korean adoptee
- Anna Song, trustee on the Santa Clara County Office of Education
- Michelle Steel, Republican Congresswoman from California's 48th congressional district (2021–2025)
- Marilyn Strickland, Democratic Congresswoman from Washington's 10th congressional district (2021–present)
- Leezah Sun, member of the Arizona House of Representatives (2023–2024)
- Julie Won, New York City Councilor (2022–Pres)
- Sam Yoon, Boston City Councillor (2005–2009), first Asian American to be elected to the position in the city

== Literature ==
See Korean American writers for a more extensive list.

- Matthew J. Baek, illustrator, children's book author, and graphic designer
- Steph Cha, novelist
- Leonard Chang, novelist, short story and TV writer
- Alexander Chee, fiction writer, poet, journalist, and reviewer
- Julia Cho, playwright and television writer
- Kah Kyung Cho, philosopher and writer
- Franny Choi, poet
- Mary H.K. Choi, author
- Sook Nyul Choi, children's storybook writer
- Susan Choi, novelist
- Heinz Insu Fenkl, novelist, folklorist, and translator
- Jenny Han, author of children's and young adult novels, including the 'To All the Boys I've Loved Before Series'
- Lee Herrick, poet
- Euny Hong, journalist and author of The Birth of Korean Cool: How One Nation is Conquering the World through Pop Culture
- Hyun Yi Kang, scholar and writer
- Minsoo Kang, historian and writer
- Younghill Kang, early Asian American writer; has been called "the father of Korean American literature"
- Crystal Hana Kim, author
- Elaine H. Kim, writer, editor and professor in Asian American Studies
- Elizabeth Kim, journalist and novelist
- Eugenia Kim, author
- Mike Kim, author
- Myung Mi Kim, poet
- Richard E. Kim, author, professor of literature
- Suki Kim, author, investigative journalist, novelist
- Suji Kwock Kim, poet, playwright, author of Notes From The Divided Country
- Corina Knoll, editor, journalist
- Cecilia Hae-Jin Lee, writer and artist
- R. O. Kwon, author
- Don Lee, author, editor
- Ed Bok Lee, poet, writer
- Min Jin Lee, novelist
- Mary Paik Lee, author of Quiet Odyssey(1990)
- Walter K. Lew, poet and scholar
- Nami Mun, novelist
- Gary Pak, writer, editor and professor of English, noted as one of the most important Asian Hawaiian writers
- Linda Sue Park, American-born writer
- Ronyoung Kim, novelist
- T. K. Seung, philosopher and literary critic
- Cathy Song, poet
- Jane Jeong Trenka, author of The Language of Blood
- Monica Youn, poet, National Book Award finalist
- Young Jean Lee, playwright and director
- Ji-Yeon Yuh, reporter, writer, editor and professor in Asian American history

== Military ==
- JoAnne S. Bass, 19th Chief Master Sergeant of the Air Force, first female senior enlisted service member of any United States military branch, first Asian American to hold the senior enlisted position in the Air Force
- Dan Choi, U.S. Army officer and gay rights activist
- Susan Ahn Cuddy, first female gunnery officer in the United States Navy
- Major Gen. Sharon K.G. Dunbar, Commander of the Air Force District of Washington (AFDW); Commander of the 320th Air Expeditionary Wing, headquartered at Joint Base Andrews, Maryland
- Jeff Hwang, U.S. Air Force fighter pilot and 1999 winner of Mackay Trophy
- Andrew Kim, former head of CIA's Korea Mission Center
- Richard C. Kim, U.S. Army brigadier general, Deputy Commander of United States Army North
- Colonel Young-Oak Kim, highly decorated U.S. Army combat veteran of World War II and the Korean War; first non-white to command an Army combat battalion in US history
- Fred Ohr, World War II ace fighter pilot
- Peter M. Rhee, trauma surgeon and military veteran
- Sue Mi Terry, CIA intelligence analyst specializing in East Asia

== Music ==
- 1nonly, rapper
- Ahn Trio, Juilliard-educated classical music trio, featured in print and television ads for Gap
- Priscilla Ahn, alternative/folk singer
- Ailee, singer based in South Korea
- AleXa, singer based in South Korea
- Amerie, R&B singer-songwriter, actress
- Anderson Paak, singer, rapper and multi-instrumentalist
- Aaron Kwak, also known as Aron, member of South Korean boy band NU'EST
- Chandol (Charley Yang), singer and social media personality.
- Sarah Chang, classical violinist and recipient of the Avery Fisher Prize
- David Choi, singer-songwriter and YouTube sensation
- Jae Chong, music producer, formerly of R&B group Solid
- Clara Chung, singer
- Dumbfoundead, rapper Jonathan Edgar Park
- Dia Frampton, musician, younger sister of Meg Frampton
- Meg Frampton, musician, older sister of Dia Frampton
- Shinik Hahm, conductor, professor
- Joe Hahn, founding member of alternative rock band Linkin Park, multi-platinum and Grammy Award winner
- Heejun Han, singer and American Idol finalist (season 11)
- Laine Hardy, singer and American Idol winner (season 17)
- Hei-Kyung Hong, soprano with The Metropolitan Opera Company
- Joshua Hong, singer, and member of South Korean boy group Seventeen
- Huh Yunjin, singer and member of South Korean girl group Le Sserafim
- Huening Kai, singer and member of South Korean boy band Tomorrow X Together
- Huening Bahiyyih, singer and member of South Korean girl group Kep1er
- Kim Samuel, former Produce 101 Contestant & Soloist
- Danny Im, member of South Korean hip hop group 1TYM, R&B singer based in South Korea
- Yuna Ito, Korean-Japanese, American-born J-pop singer and actress
- Jessi, singer and rapper
- Brian Joo, member of South Korean duo Fly to the Sky, R&B singer based in South Korea
- Jessica Jung, singer, musical actress of the South Korean version of Legally Blonde: The Musical; former member of group Girls' Generation; sister of Krystal Jung
- Krystal Jung, singer, dancer, actress, model; member of South Korean group f(x); sister of Jessica Jung
- Nicole Jung, singer, dancer, rapper and former member of KARA
- Crystal Kay, J-pop (Zainichi Korean) singer
- David Kim, concertmaster of the Philadelphia Orchestra
- Dennis Kim, concertmaster of the Pacific Symphony Orchestra
- Eun Sun Kim, conductor of the San Francisco Opera
- Earl Kim, pianist and composer; Harvard University professor
- Eli Kim, member of South Korean boy band U-KISS
- George Han Kim (also known as Johan Kim), singer and member of former R&B group Solid
- Paul Kim, classical pianist
- Rebecca Kim, rapper, ex-member of band After School
- Stephanie Kim, singer, dancer and member of South Korean girl group The Grace
- Soovin Kim, violinist from New York City
- Andy Lee, singer, actor, and member of South Korean boy band Shinhwa
- JinJoo Lee, guitarist and member of DNCE.
- Kodi Lee, pianist and singer-songwriter
- Megan Lee, singer, actress
- Sean Lee, violinist, four-season concertmaster and teaching assistant at Juilliard
- Sunny Lee, singer, radio host, member of South Korean group Girls' Generation
- Kevin Kwan Loucks, pianist and arts entrepreneur
- Nancy McDonie, singer and member of South Korean group Momoland
- Lucia Micarelli, violinist
- Eric Mun, rapper, actor and leader/member of South Korean boy band Shinhwa
- John Myung, bass guitar player of progressive metal band Dream Theater
- Eric Nam, singer and TV host based in South Korea
- Soon Hee Newbold, composer, conductor and violinist
- Karen O, lead singer of the Yeah Yeah Yeahs
- Eugene Park, electric violinist in South Korea
- Jae Park, singer-songwriter, composer, and former guitarist for South Korean band Day6
- Jay Park, hip hop singer, rapper, b-boy, dancer, and former ex leader of 2PM
- John Park, singer and first runner up of Superstar K2, Korean version of American Idol, semi-finalist on American Idol.
- Park Joon-hyung, rapper and leader/member of South Korean pop group g.o.d
- Lena Park, K-pop, R&B singer, songwriter, composer
- Mike Park, ska and punk musician, founder of Asian Man Records
- Teddy Park, member of 1TYM, singer/rapper/producer based in South Korea.
- Todd Park Mohr, lead vocals/guitars/keyboards/saxophone of Big Head Todd and the Monsters
- Peniel Shin, rapper, and member of South Korean boy group BTOB
- Son Hoyoung, singer and member of South Korean pop group g.o.d
- Susie Suh, singer-songwriter, signed with Epic Records
- T (Tasha Reid), R&B singer based in South Korea
- Nosaj Thing (Jason Chung), electronic musician
- Tiger JK, musician
- Tim, R&B singer based in South Korea
- Tokimonsta (Jennifer Lee), electronic music artist, producer, and DJ
- Kevin Woo, singer, dancer and member of South Korean Boy Band U-KISS
- Kiki Wong, guitarist of Smashing Pumpkins
- Yaeji Lee, singer, producer, and DJ
- Steve Seung-Jun Yoo, singer and dancer formerly based in South Korea
- Scott Yoo, conductor, host of Now hear this on the PBS network.
- Tiffany Young, singer, musical actress Fame as Carmen Diaz; member of South Korean group Girls' Generation
- Michelle Zauner, singer and songwriter who performs under the name Japanese Breakfast

== Religion ==
- Su Bong, Soen Sa Nim in the Kwan Um School of Zen and the designated heir of Seung Sahn's lineage
- Peter Ahn, translator of the New American Standard Bible
- Eugene Cho, President of Bread for the World
- Hae Jong Kim, Bishop of the United Methodist Church
- Julius Kim, President of The Gospel Coalition
- Walter Kim, President of National Association of Evangelicals
- James A. Lee, President of Southern Reformed College and Seminary
- Michael Oh, CEO of Lausanne Committee for World Evangelization
- Andrew S. Park, theologian
- Angela Warnick Buchdahl, rabbi

== Science, technology and education ==
- Tae-Ung Baik, professor of law at the University of Hawaii Manoa William S. Richardson School of Law; legal scholar of international human rights law and Korean law
- Victor Cha, professor in Asian studies, former Director for Asian Affairs in the White House's National Security Council
- Dennis Choi, neuroscientist at Emory University, member of the Institute of Medicine of the National Academies, former executive vice president for neuroscience at Merck, former chairman of the department of neurology at Washington University in St. Louis School of Medicine
- Howard Choi, spinal cord injury specialist
- Esther Choo, emergency physician and professor at the Oregon Health & Science University
- John Chun, designer of AC Cobra and Shelby Mustang GT350 and GT500 models; Tonka Toys designer
- Jefferson Han, one of the main developers of "multi-touch sensing" technology, owner of Perceptive Pixel company
- Moo-Young Han, physicist
- Dennis Hong, professor and the founding director of RoMeLa (Robotics & Mechanisms Laboratory) of the Mechanical & Aerospace Engineering Department at UCLA
- Waun Ki Hong, Division Head and Professor at the University of Texas MD Anderson Cancer Center and pioneer in field of cancer chemoprevention and cancer medicine.
- Hyun Yi Kang, scholar and writer; chair of Women's Studies and Associate Professor in Comparative Literature and English at University of California, Irvine
- Minsoo Kang, historian and writer at University of Missouri
- Sung-Mo "Steve" Kang, chancellor of University of California, Merced; former professor of electrical and computer engineering at various institutions
- Larry Kwak, world-renowned physician and scientist who has pioneered breakthrough innovations in immunology and cancer vaccines; and named one of Time Magazine's 100 Most Influential People in 2010.
- Jaegwon Kim, William Herbert Perry Faunce Professor of Philosophy at Brown University
- Jeong H. Kim, president of Bell Labs
- Jim Yong Kim, Francois Xavier Bagnoud Professor Health and Human Rights at Harvard University; former director of HIV/AIDS at the World Health Organization; 17th president of Dartmouth College; president of the World Bank
- June Huh, 2022 Fields medalist mathematician, professor at Princeton University
- Peter S. Kim, president of Merck, former MIT-Whitehead Institute for Biomedical Research biochemist, member of National Academy of Sciences
- Howard Koh, professor of the Practice of Public Health; associate dean for Public Health Practice at the Harvard School of Public Health; former Massachusetts Commissioner of Public Health
- Bandy X. Lee, psychiatrist with Yale University and the co-author of the book, The Dangerous Case of Donald Trump
- Benjamin W. Lee, theoretical physicist (influenced development of the Standard Model)
- Chang-Rae Lee, professor of creative writing at Princeton University; novelist
- Jung-Min Lee, oncologist at the National Cancer Institute
- David Oh, NASA engineer and lead flight director of the Mars Curiosity rover
- Andrew S. Park, Methodist theologian
- Gary Pak, professor of English at University of Hawaii at Mānoa; one of the most important Asian Hawaiian writers
- No-Hee Park, Dean of the School of Dentistry at the University of California, Los Angeles.
- Mark L. Polansky, NASA astronaut
- Michelle Rhee, former chancellor of District of Columbia Public Schools; education reform advocate
- Sebastian Seung, computational neuroscientist, brain and cognitive sciences professor at MIT, and author of Connectomes
- Nam-Pyo Suh, doctor of engineering of Carnegie Mellon University, 14th president of KAIST in South Korea
- Jeannie Suk, assistant professor of law at Harvard Law School; award-winning writer
- Meredith Jung-En Woo, dean of the college and graduate school of arts and sciences at the University of Virginia, professor of political science and Korean studies
- Ji-Yeon Yuh, professor in Asian American history and Asian diasporas at the Northwestern University
- Joon Yun, radiologist; founder of Palo Alto Institute

== Sports ==
- Kenny Allen Former NFL player; Father is from Korea
- Darwin Barney, MLB player; grandfather is from Korea and grandmother is from Japan
- Alycia Baumgardner, professional boxer
- Stephanie Bell also known as Jade, Mia Tim and Michin, professional wrestler
- Marissa Brandt, Olympic ice hockey player
- Eugene Chung, former NFL player, first Korean American to be drafted in the 1st round, played offensive line
- Rich Cho, NBA executive, Vice President of Basketball Strategy of Memphis Grizzlies
- Simon Cho, Olympic speed skater; won the bronze medal in men's 5000 meter relay at the 2010 Vancouver Games
- John Choi, e-sports player
- Scott Coker, former mixed martial arts founder and businessman for Strikeforce and Bellator MMA
- Hank Conger, MLB player
- Lavi Crain, artistic gymnast, mother is from Korea
- Emily Cross, Olympic fencer; won the silver medal in foil team at the 2008 Beijing Games
- Toby Dawson, Olympic skier, won the bronze medal in men's freestyle skiing at the 2006 Torino Games
- Bill Demong, Olympic skier; mother is half Korean
- Marcus Demps, American football player
- Will Demps, American football player
- Dane Dunning, MLB Player
- Jake Dunning, MLB player
- Johnny Eblen, mixed martial artist
- Tommy Edman, MLB player, mother is from Korea.
- Tom Farden, head coach of the Utah Red Rocks
- Marcus Freeman, head coach of Notre Dame Football, former NFL player
- James Hahn, professional golfer
- Kyle Hamilton, First-team All-American Notre Dame football player
- Benson Henderson, mixed martial artist, former UFC lightweight champion
- Sam Howell, American football quarterback
- John Huh, professional golfer
- Vicky Hurst, professional golfer
- Jahmai Jones, MLB outfielder and second basemen
- Anthony Kim, professional golfer
- Chloe Kim, elite snowboarder, Winter X Games gold medalist (superpipe, 2015) Olympic gold medalist (halfpipe, 2018)
- Christina Kim, professional golfer
- Kevin Kim, tennis player
- Jessica Pegula, tennis player; daughter of Terry and Kim Pegula
- Kim Pegula, businesswoman and co-owner of Pegula Sports and Entertainment (Buffalo Bills, Buffalo Sabres, and other teams) alongside her husband Terry; born in Seoul and adopted by an American family at age 5
- Younghoe Koo, American football player
- Tae Man Kwon, Hapkido Grand Master; 9th degree Black Belt
- Alison Lee, professional golfer
- Angela Lee, mixed martial artist
- Brandun Lee, professional boxer
- Jeanette Lee, pool player, nicknamed "The Black Widow" for her tendency to wear black
- John Lee, former football player
- Sammy Lee, diver, first American-born male Asian Olympic gold medalist
- David Lipsky, professional golfer; mother is from Korea
- Moon Tae-jong, professional basketball player
- Kyler Murray, NFL quarterback
- Kevin Na, professional golfer
- Naomi Nari Nam, figure skater
- Jim Paek, NHL hockey player
- Angela Park, professional golfer
- Jane Park, professional golfer
- Richard Park, NHL player
- B.J. Penn, mixed martial artist and former UFC lightweight and welterweight champion
- Casey Phair, South Korean professional footballer
- Rob Refsnyder, MLB player; born in Seoul, South Korea, and adopted by a couple from Southern California when he was five months old.
- Jhoon Rhee, taekwondo master and entrepreneur
- Terrmel Sledge, MLB player
- Daewon Song, professional skateboarder
- Sonya Thomas, aka "Black Widow," competitive eater, holder of 29 world titles
- Hines Ward, football player, MVP of Super Bowl XL
- Michelle Wie West, professional golfer
- Alex Yi, soccer player
- Ariane Andrew also known as Cameron, professional wrestler
- Shay Whitcomb, MLB infielder
- James Yun, professional wrestler
- Ben Leber, NFL Linebacker

== Other ==
- Emma Broyles, Miss America 2022, as Miss Alaska.
- Philip Jaisohn, first Korean to become an American citizen; first Korean American to receive an American medical degree (Originally from Boseong County, Jeollanam-do, South Korea)
- Yeonmi Park, North Korean defector
