= Luxe =

Luxe may refer to:

- Luxé, a commune in Charente department, France
- Luxe (company), developer of the Luxe app, an on-demand parking and car services mobile application
- The Luxe, a 2007 young adult novel by Anna Godbersen
- LUXE, a 2017 electro soul and dream pop compilation album
- Luxe Radio, a Moroccan radio network
- Luxe.tv, a worldwide TV network

== See also ==
- Deluxe (disambiguation)
