= Kim Yu-yeon =

Kim Yu-yeon (Korean: 김유연) may refer to:

- Kim Yu-yeon (curator) (born 1956), South Korean curator
- Kim Yoo-yeon (sport shooter) (born 1982), South Korean sport shooter
- Kim Yu-yeon (swimmer) (born 1991), South Korean swimmer
- Kim Yoo-yeon (singer) (born 2001), South Korean singer and member of TripleS
