= 102.0 FM =

FM radio frequency

The following radio stations broadcast on FM frequency 102.0 MHz:

== Africa ==
- Radio Okapi in Matadi, Congo

== Bulgaria ==
- N-JOY in Plovdiv

== China ==
- CNR Music Radio in Chenzhou
- CRI Voice of the South China Sea in Qionghai
- Shantou Radio & TV Station Economic Radio in Shantou
- CNR The Voice Of China in Taishan

== France ==
- Vibration in Nogent-le-Rotrou and Orléans

== Indonesia ==
- Prambors FM in Semarang, Central Java
- RRI Pro 1 in Bogor, West Java

== India ==
- AIR FM Rainbow in Visakhapatnam

== Ireland ==
- Beat 102 103 in North Wexford, South Carlow and Kilkenny
- CUH FM Hospital Radio in Cork University Hospital, Cork, County Cork

== Israel ==
- Radio Eilat in Eilat
- Radio Tel Aviv in Gush Dan

== Latvia ==
- European Hit Radio in Madona

== Malaysia ==
- Era in Tapah, Bidor, Chenderiang and Trolak, Perak
- Manis FM in Kuala Terengganu, Terengganu

== Morocco ==
- Luxe Radio in Essaouira

== Slovenia ==
- Radio ARS, Krvavec transmitter

== Spain ==
- Radio Nacional in Logroño

== United Kingdom ==
- Capital Manchester and Lancashire in Manchester
- Capital Mid-Counties in Stratford-upon-Avon
- Drystone Radio in Wharfedale
- Greatest Hits Radio Derbyshire in Bakewell, Matlock and Barnsley
- Greatest Hits Radio South in Salisbury
- Greatest Hits Radio Surrey & East Hampshire in Alton and Bordon
- Nation Radio Suffolk in Ipswich and Suffolk
- Heart South in Hastings
- Isle of Wight Radio in Cowes, Ventnor and Ryde
- Original 106 in Dundee
