= Then I Met You =

== Brand ==
- Then I Met You, a skincare brand launched by Charlotte Cho

== Albums ==
- Then I Met You, a 2010 album by Vinnie Who.
