= Yuh =

Yuh may refer to:

== People ==
- Yuh Hwan-kil (1962–2009), South Korean boxer
- Yuh Jae-doo (born 1948), South Korean boxer
- Ji-Yeon Yuh, American academic
- Yuh Myung-woo (born 1964), South Korean boxer
- Jennifer Yuh Nelson (born 1972), American film director

== Music ==
- "Get Into It (Yuh)", a 2021 song by Doja Cat
