= Lodestone Theatre Ensemble =

Theatre organization based in Los Angeles

- logo by Meina Co
- Formation: 1999
- Dissolved: 2009
- Type: Theatre group
- Purpose: Asian American theatre
- Location: Studio City, California
- Notable members: Chil Kong; Alexandra Bokyun Chun; Dennis Dun; Roger Fan; Daniel Dae Kim; Camille Mana; Eddie Shin; Kelvin Han Yee

Lodestone Theatre Ensemble was a non-profit Asian American theatre organization in Los Angeles, founded in 1999. It was a membership-driven organization. The ensemble disbanded in 2009.

== History ==
In 1995, following the 1992 Los Angeles riots, veteran actor Soon-Tek Oh created the Society of Heritage Performers (SHP), a Korean American theatre ensemble. SHP evolved into Lodestone Theatre Ensemble in 1999, organized by original founders: actors Alexandra Bokyun Chun, Tim Lounibos and Chil Kong, and writer Philip W. Chung. Their new focus was embracing a broader Asian Pacific American identity. Chung and Kong remain as present co-artistic directors.

In 2009, Kong appeared on the GSN game show, Catch 21, starring Alfonso Ribeiro and Mikki Padilla, finishing in second place.

== Programs ==
Lodestone Theatre Ensemble has presented over 75 mainstage productions, special events, and readings/workshops of both new and established works. New works are presented in the "Yellow Box" reading series. Theatre for Teens and Youth Outreach programs aid disadvantaged youth in partnership with Asian Pacific Health Care Venture, Korean Youth Cultural Center and Asian Youth Center. Mainstage productions are done in residence at the GTC (Grove Theatre Center) in Burbank, California.

== Productions ==
=== 1999 ===
- Texas by Judy Soo Hoo
- Laughter, Joy & Loneliness & Sex & Sex & Sex & Sex by Philip W. Chung

=== 2000 ===
- American Monsters by Philip W. Chung, Matt Pelfrey, Judy Soo Hoo

=== 2001 ===
- A Dirty Secret Between the Toes by Annette Lee
- Terminus Americana by Matt Pelfrey

=== 2002 ===
- Freak Storm by Matt Pelfrey
- Refrigerators by Judy Soo Hoo
- When Tigers Smoked Long Pipes by Angela Kang

=== 2004 ===
- Claim to Fame by Isaac Ho

=== 2005 ===
- Solve For X by Judy Soo Hoo
- American Monsters 2 by Corinne Chooey, Isaac Ho, Angela Kang, Oanh Ly, Judy Soo Hoo

=== 2006 ===
- The Golden Hour by Philip W. Chung
- One Nation, Under God by Philip W. Chung

=== 2007 ===
- Telemongol (with sketch comedy troupes, OPM and 18 Mighty Mountain Warriors, and improv group Cold Tofu)
- The Mikado Project by Doris Baizley & Ken Narasaki
- The Trojan Women by Euripides, translated by Kenneth Cavender

=== 2008 ===
- Trapezoid by Nic Cha Kim
- Suddenly, Last Summer by Tennessee Williams

=== 2009 ===
- Ten to Life by Nic Cha Kim, Annette Lee, Tim Lounibos, and Judy Soo Hoo
