= Leo Koguan =

American businessman (born 1955)

Leo KoGuan
- Born: 1955 (age 70–71); Indonesia
- Education: Columbia University; New York Law School
- Known for: Chairman and co-founder, SHI International
- Spouse: Thai Lee (m. 1989; div. 2002)
- Children: 1

Leo Koguan
- Traditional Chinese: 廖凱原
- Simplified Chinese: 廖凯原
Transcriptions
Standard Mandarin
- Hanyu Pinyin: Liào Kǎiyuán
Yue: Cantonese
- Jyutping: Liu^{6} Hoi^{2}-jyun^{4}
Southern Min
- Hokkien POJ: Liāu Khái-guân
- Teochew Peng'im: Liou^{7} Kai^{2}-nguêng^{5}

Leo Koguan (born 1955) is an Indonesian-born Chinese American businessman, investor, and philanthropist. He is the chairman and co-founder of SHI International Corp, and was the third-largest individual shareholder in Tesla, Inc.

== Biography ==
Leo was born in Indonesia in 1955 to Chinese parents. He then moved to the United States and graduated from Columbia University's School of International and Public Affairs and New York Law School.

Leo co-founded SHI International Corp., an enterprise software company headquartered in Somerset, New Jersey with his ex-wife Thai Lee. He also invested in luxury hotel development in Shanghai's Xintiandi district through his shares in Shui On Land.

Leo is known in Mainland China for his philanthropic activities to a number of top universities. In 2008, Leo donated $30 million to Shanghai Jiao Tong University, which renamed its law school after him. He also donated $28 million to Peking University, which named one of its law school buildings after him. He endowed scholarships at Peking University and was named an honorary trustee. He was a donor to Tsinghua University, which named the new Tsinghua University Law Library after him. He also made a $12.5 million donation to Fudan University, which named its law building after him.

Initially a retail investor, Leo picked up stock trading in 2019 and amassed a fortune through his position in Tesla. He was the company's third largest individual shareholder, behind Elon Musk and Larry Ellison, until December 2024, when Leo began reducing Tesla shares.

== Personal life ==
In 1989, Leo Koguan married Thai Lee, who is now the president and CEO of SHI International. They divorced in 2002.

Leo lives in Singapore. In October 2020, he paid S$62M for Singapore's largest penthouse, Guoco Tower's Wallich Residence, from British inventor and billionaire entrepreneur Sir James Dyson.

As of May 2024, Leo had a net worth of $6 billion, according to Forbes.
