= Robert C. Orr =

Robert Cameron Orr is an American policy maker and academic who serves as Professor of Public Policy at the University of Maryland and as Special Advisor for Climate Change to the United Nations Secretary-General.

== Early life and education ==
Orr is the son of two public high school teachers and grew up in California.

He holds a Ph.D. and M.P.A. in international relations from the School of Public and International Affairs at Princeton University, and a bachelor's degree from the University of California Los Angeles (UCLA).[2] He also studied at Beijing University in Beijing, China, National Taiwan Normal University in Taipei, Taiwan, and La Potificia Universidad Catolica in Lima, Peru. He speaks Spanish and Mandarin Chinese.

== Career ==
In 2014 Orr was appointed Professor and Dean of the University of Maryland School of Public Policy. During his tenure as Dean of the highly ranked school, he led rapid growth of the school, created two new undergraduate majors, built the school's new award-winning home in Thurgood Marshall Hall, and was elected to serve as President of the Network of Schools of Public Policy, Affairs and Administration (NASPAA), the association of over 300 schools of public policy and affairs in the United States and globally. In 2025 he stepped down as Dean, while continuing to serve as Professor at the School.

Orr simultaneously serves as Under-Secretary General and Special Advisor to the United Nations Secretary-General for Climate Change, a position he has held since 2014. In this role he has facilitated global climate action under the Paris Agreement, a landmark international treaty adopted in 2015, alongside UN Special Envoy Michael Bloomberg. Orr has been recognized as a key architect of this pathbreaking treaty.

From 2004 to 2014, Orr served as the United Nations Assistant Secretary-General for Policy Coordination and Strategic Planning in the Executive Office of the Secretary-General, under Secretaries-General Kofi Annan and Ban Ki-moon. In this capacity he was responsible for running the Secretary-General's Policy Committee, was a member of the Management Committee, and was responsible for creating major UN initiatives including the Paris Climate Agreement, Sustainable Energy for All (SE4All), the Every Woman Every Child maternal and child health movement, the creation of a new UN Human Rights Council, the UN Global Strategy on Counter-Terrorism and the Global Counter Terrorism Center, the UN Peacebuilding Council, support office and fund, as well as the Global Pulse, a big data initiative with Pulse Labs in New York, Jakarta, Indonesia, and Kampala, Uganda. In 2014 the United Nations Secretary-General issued a public statement crediting Orr for these initiatives: "On subjects as diverse as counter-terrorism, human rights, peacebuilding, women's and children's health, public-private partnerships and climate change, Mr. Orr has forged the strategy and architecture for a twenty-first century United Nations."

In 2003, Orr was named executive director of the Belfer Center for Science and International Affairs at the Kennedy School of Government at Harvard University. Before that, he was Director of the Council on Foreign Relations in Washington, D.C., where he ran the Congressional, Corporate, and membership programs. He remains a life member of CFR.

Between 2001 and 2003, Orr co-directed a bipartisan commission on post-conflict reconstruction sponsored by the Center for Strategic and International Studies in Washington and the Association of the United States Army. On the basis of this work, in 2003 he was asked by the U.S. Secretary of Defense to lead an independent field assessment of the U.S. occupation of Iraq. This assessment made multiple recommendations for a course correction in U.S. policy to the Secretary of Defense, the Secretary of State, and both houses of the U.S. Congress.

Between 1996 and 2001, Orr held a variety of senior positions in the Government of the United States. He served as Deputy to Richard Holbrooke, the United States Ambassador to the United Nations and Director of the USUN Washington office. In this capacity, he helped secure agreement by the U.S. Congress and the UN member states of the "reform for arrears" deal that resulted in U.S. payment of nearly $1 billion of delayed US membership fees to the United Nations. As Director of Global and Multilateral Affairs at the National Security Council in the White House from 1996-1997, he helped to negotiate the Helms-Biden Act, signed by President Clinton, which served as the legal basis for the payment of U.S. arrears. At the NSC he was in charge of peacekeeping, humanitarian and multilateral affairs. While serving in the White House he also led the U.S. negotiating team that resulted in the Caribbean/United States Summit Partnership for Prosperity and Security in the Caribbean, signed by President Clinton and all heads of state of the Caribbean Community (CARICOM) in May 1997.

Prior to this Orr served at the International Peace Academy in New York, with the United States Agency for International Development (USAID) in Nairobi, Kenya, and as Mandarin Chinese-English interpreter and advisor for Dan Rather of CBS News in Beijing, China as well as correspondent Bob Simon, whose resulting stories from China received multiple Emmy Awards.

== Personal life ==
In 2000 he married Audrey Choi, then chief-of-staff to the Council of Economic Advisers and the daughter of children's author Sook Nyul Choi. They have two children.
