= Southern Reformed College and Seminary =

U.S. non-denominational, Christian educational institution

Coordinates: 29°49′16″N 95°41′17″W

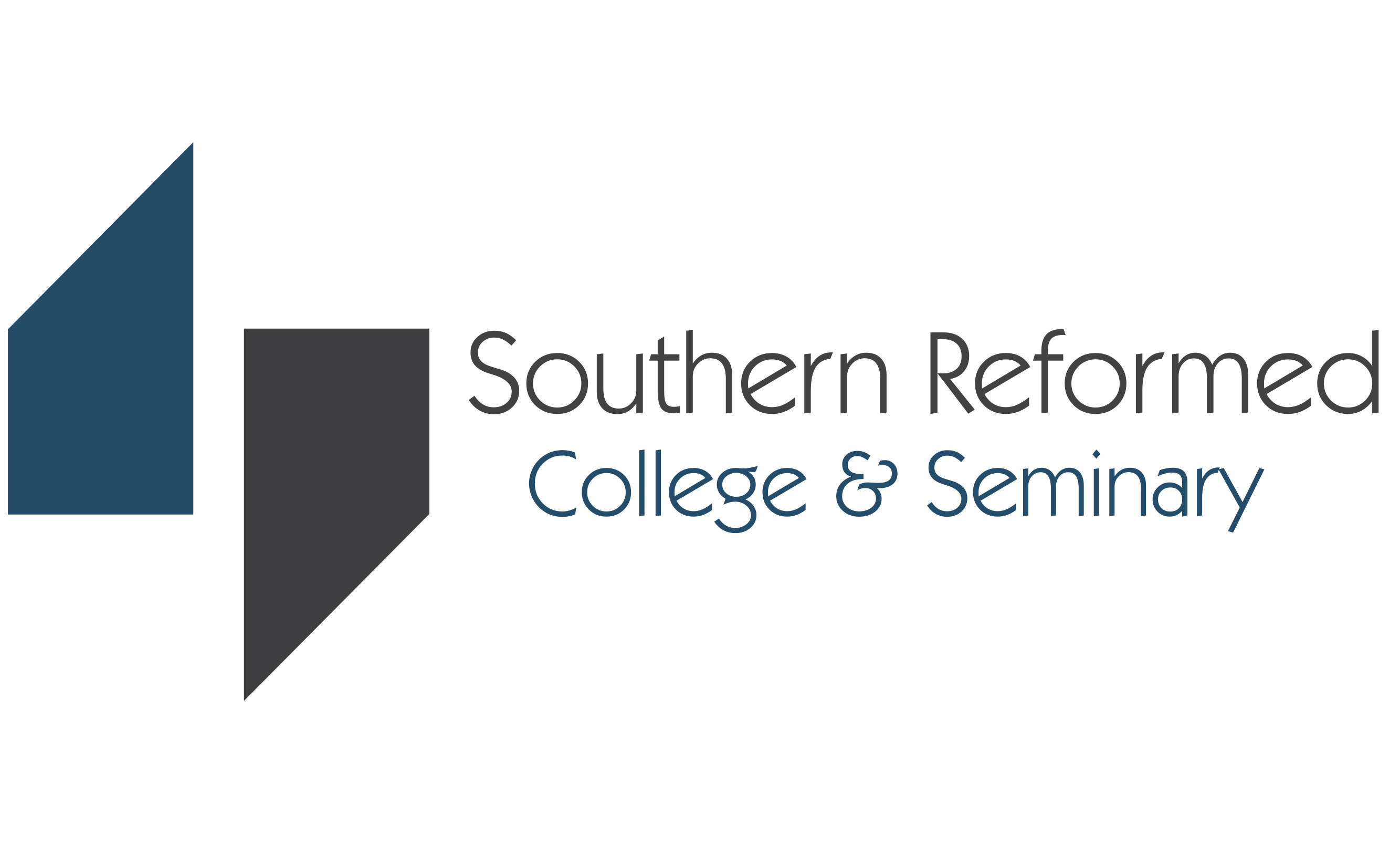
- Founded: 2008
- President: Steve W. Hall, DMin.
- Website: www.srsem.net

Southern Reformed College and Seminary is a multi-cultural, Christian theological institution based in the United States that is established to serve the underserved in the Houston metropolitan area.

== History ==
Southern Reformed College and Seminary was founded in 2008. The institution is broadly evangelical that embraces all Reformed expressions from Baptist, Presbyterian, Dispensationalist, Methodist, and charismatic theological traditions. The school is a member of Association for Biblical Higher Education. The current president is Dr. Steve W. Hall.
