= Dana Tai Soon Burgess =

American choreographer and dancer

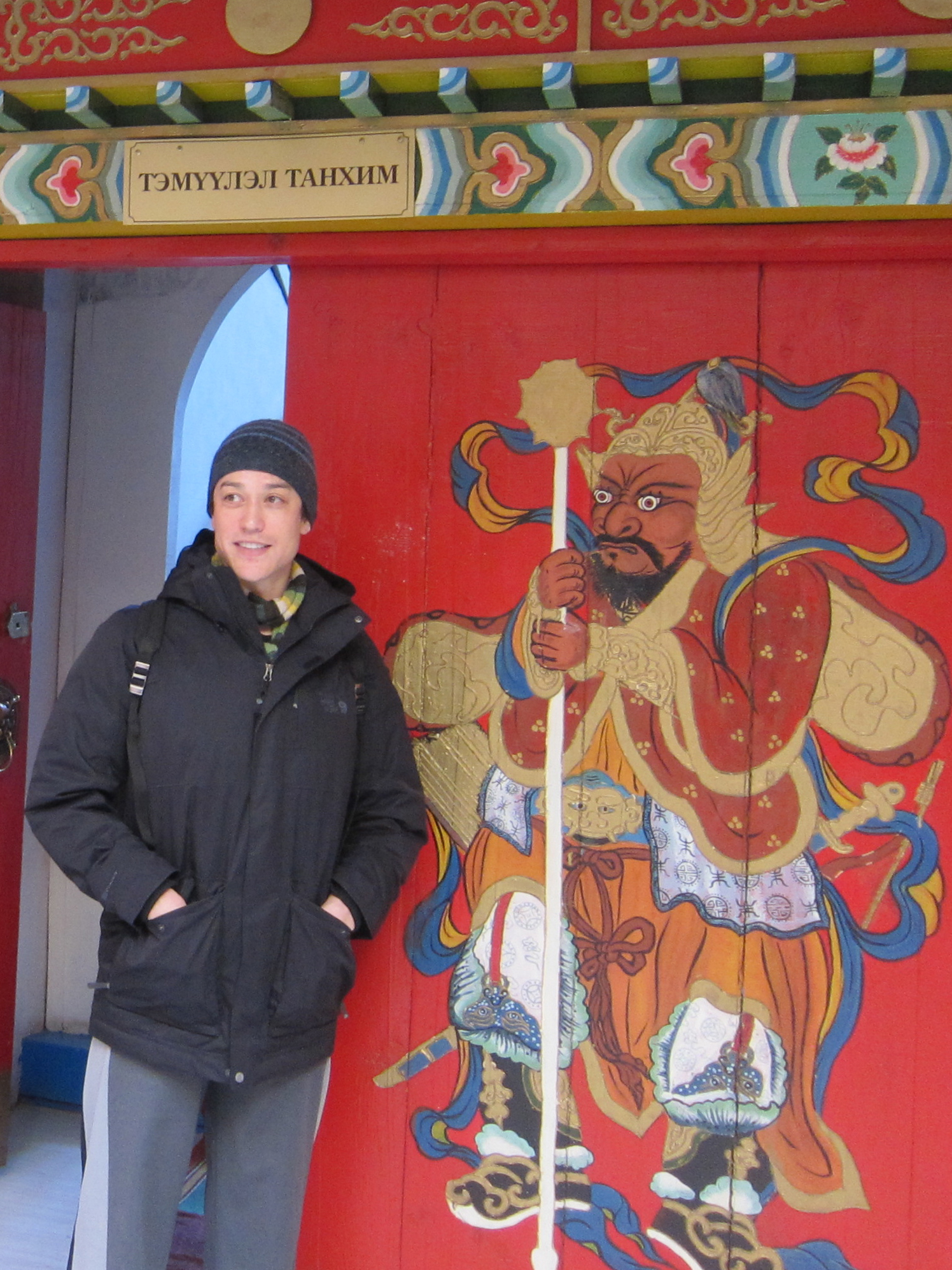
- Burgess in Ulaanbaatar, Mongolia in March 2011
- Born: February 26, 1968 (age 58); Carmel, California
- Education: Santa Fe High School 1985
- Alma mater: University of New Mexico 1990; George Washington University 1994
- Occupations: Dancer, choreographer, cultural envoy, advocate
- Years active: 1991–present
- Notable work: Tracings, Island, Charlie Chan and the Mystery of Love, We choose to go to the moon
- Spouse: Jameson Freeman

Dana Tai Soon Burgess (born February 26, 1968) is an American choreographer and dancer. In May 2016 Burgess was named the Smithsonian's first-ever choreographer in residence at the National Portrait Gallery. His work has tended to focus on the "hyphenated person" (someone who is of mixed ethnic or cultural heritage), as well as issues of belonging and societal acceptance. He serves as a cultural envoy for the U.S. State Department, an appointment he uses to promote international cultural dialogue through "the global language of dance." Throughout his career, Burgess has performed, taught, and choreographed around the world.

== Early life and education ==
Burgess was born in California but grew up in Santa Fe, New Mexico, the son of visual artists Joseph James Burgess Jr. and Anna Kang Burgess. He began dancing at the age of 16 after a brief childhood career as a competitive martial artist. His mother is descended from the first group of Korean immigrants to come to America. His earliest Korean American ancestors are Chin Hyung Chai, who arrived in Hawaii aboard the Gaelic, known as the "first ship," in 1903, and Man Soo Kang, who arrived on the ship Manchuria in 1904. They became Hawaiian plantation workers.

After graduating from Santa Fe High School in 1985, Burgess attended the University of New Mexico and studied dance and Asian history. Burgess graduated in 1990 and moved to Washington, D.C., where he attended the George Washington University and completed a master's degree in Fine Arts in 1994. He has trained with notable dancers, such as Tim Wengerd and Judith Bennahum. He also studied the Michio Itō technique in Washington, D.C.

== Career ==
=== Choreography & Dance Company ===
In 1992, Burgess established the Moving Forward: Contemporary Asian American Dance Company. This was renamed in 2005 to Dana Tai Soon Burgess & Co. (DTSB&Co.) and again in 2013 to Dana Tai Soon Burgess Dance Company (DTSBDC). It is the preeminent contemporary dance company in the Washington, D.C., area.

In 2006, he retired from dancing due to a bad back. But in 2008, he returned to the stage as a stand-in for one of his dancers, which resulted in a Washington Post review by critic Sarah Kaufman called "Retired Burgess Hasn't Lost A Step" that said "Burgess has emerged as the area's leading dance artist, consistently following his own path and producing distinctive, well-considered works." The performance included the premiere of Hyphen, a surrealist dance work featuring video images by Nam June Paik from the 1960s, which Burgess was granted special access to.

In May, 2014 he was quoted in Smithsonian magazine as saying his artistic focus had shifted to exploring the idea of cultural "confluence".

Burgess has retired from dancing due to a back injury, but is still teaching, researching and choreographing extensively.

In May 2016 Burgess was named the Smithsonian's first-ever choreographer in residence at the National Portrait Gallery.

Burgess has collaborated with renowned lighting designer Jennifer Tipton, designer Han Feng, sculptor John Dreyfuss, artist CYJO, among others.

=== Touring ===
Burgess's dance works have been performed in numerous venues, including the Kennedy Center, La Mama, the United Nations headquarters, Dance Place, the Corcoran Gallery of Art, the Asia Society, and the Lincoln Center Out of Doors. He spoke and presented his dance Dariush at the White House at the invitation of President Barack Obama in May 2013 as part of National Asian and Pacific Islander Heritage Month.

Burgess's choreography has also been commissioned by Ballet Memphis and the Kennedy Center. His work "The Nightingale" toured to over 70 American cities.

Burgess' work has focused on the immigrant experience and cultural divides, which has resulted in several of his performances being showcased on prominent State Department sponsored tours around the world. He has taught, lectured, performed and toured around the world in countries such as Surinam, Egypt, Israel, Jordan, Korea, China, India, Pakistan, Mongolia, Venezuela, Germany, Latvia, Ecuador, Panama, Mexico, Peru, and Cambodia, among others.

=== Recent work ===
On August 11, 2013, Dana Tai Soon Burgess Dance Company performed a new dance work Revenant Elegy at The National Gallery of Art, inspired by their Diaghilev and the Ballets Russes Exhibit, organized by the Victoria and Albert Museum of London. This was followed by a residency at the National Portrait Gallery, where Burgess created a dance work called Homage inspired by the museum's "Dancing the Dream" exhibition. Both Revenant Elegy and Homage were performed at the Kennedy Center in February, 2014.

He was the first Smithsonian choreographer-in-residence at the National Portrait Gallery from 2013 to 2014. In April 2014, Burgess premiered the new work Confluence there to critical acclaim. Burgess and his dancers were featured as part of the museum's “Dancing the Dream” exhibition, where his portrait hung alongside modern-dance pioneers including Isadora Duncan and Martha Graham, and contemporary 'masters' Twyla Tharp and Mark Morris. Audiences and museum tourists were able to observe the "living exhibit" of Burgess choreographing and rehearsing with his dancers from August, 2013 through July, 2014.

Burgess' portrait was previously featured at the National Portrait Gallery in the KYOPO exhibit, a work by artist CYJO in 2011. Burgess's 2008 surrealist work "Hyphen" was re-staged to be included alongside an orchestral multimedia performance called "KYOPO: Multiplicity" by CYJO in the museum's Kogod Courtyard in 2012.

In May 2014 he told Smithsonian magazine that his work Confluence, created as part of DTSBDC's residency at National Portrait Gallery, explored “an underlying inter-connectedness" of all people. When asked if this work was "influenced by America's increasingly diverse population", he said, “Yes, I think the cultural terrain is changing as is my company's focus. Somehow I feel that my aesthetic is embracing a much larger vision of humanity's shared emotional journey.”

In November 2014 the Korean Cultural Center of Washington, DC presented an exhibition called "Ancestry, Artistry, Choreography" about Burgess, his immigrant ancestors, and his dance company that "document[ed] his multicultural background and its influence on his ballet-meets-contemporary work". The exhibition featured family photographs and artifacts, including his grandfather's 1903 passport, as well as 22 large photographs, costumes, props and video from the dance company's 22-year history.

Burgess premiered Picasso Dances, a work inspired by four Pablo Picasso paintings at the Kreeger Museum, in March 2015 to critical acclaim. The piece was a result of a 3-month residency at the museum.

In September 2015 he premiered "We choose to go to the moon", a dance created in partnership with NASA and inspired by John F. Kennedy's 1962 speech of the same name, the space race, and "humanity's shared relationship with the cosmos", at the Kennedy Center. The tech-heavy and multimedia performance included interviews conducted by Burgess with astronauts (including Bruce McCandless), space scientists and experts, and a New Mexican medicine woman. The work received favorable reviews and significant press attention.

In May 2016 Burgess was named the Smithsonian's first-ever choreographer in residence at the National Portrait Gallery.

Starting in 2021, Dana Tai Soon Burgess Dance Company launched a short dance film series, with each video honoring social justice icons, including Marian Anderson, William A. Campbell, Charlayne Hunter-Gault, J. Rosamond Johnson, Earl Warren, Cesar Chavez and Dolores Huerta, and George Takei.

Burgess launched Slant Podcast, "a discussion series with Asian-American luminaries from the arts, academia, journalism, and other sectors about identity, belonging, and creating in America" in June 2021. Tony-winning playwright David Henry Hwang was the first guest.

In 2024, the Dana Tai Soon Burgess Dance Company joined in the Kennedy Center's 10,000 Dreams: A Celebration of Asian Choreography festival along with other dance groups The Washington Ballet, Pacific Northwest Ballet, Singapore Ballet, Goh Ballet, Ballet West, Houston Ballet and the National Ballet of China in honor of Choo San Goh.

=== Youth programs ===
At the time he founded his dance company, Burgess also established the Moving Forward: Asian American Youth Program, which was a summer program for Asian American youth. The program still operates under the name DTSB Asian American Youth Program, and is a year-round mentoring program for high school students. Feeling "caught between different cultural worlds" as a child, Burgess has said he created the program as a way for young people to explore identity, artistic self-expression, and their Asian American heritage.

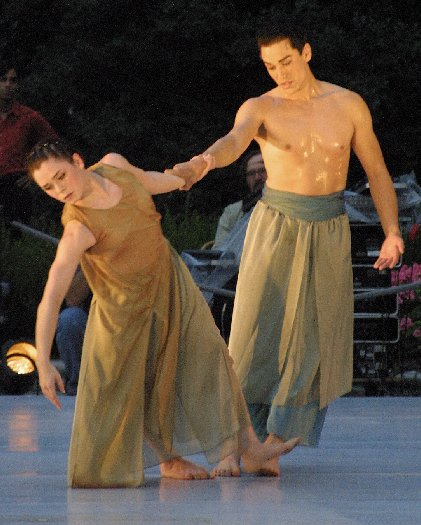
Burgess during a public performance on the National Mall in Washington, D.C., in 2002

=== Teaching ===
Burgess has taught at the Kirov Academy of Ballet and the Washington Ballet in Washington, D.C., the Hamburg Ballet in Germany, the National Ballet of Peru, San Marcos University in Peru, Sejong University in Korea, as well as in China, Mongolia, India, Jordan, and the British Virgin Islands, among others.

Burgess' teaching career has also included George Mason University, Georgetown University, the University of Maryland and George Washington University. At 26 Burgess became Director of Georgetown University's dance program in 1994. He began teaching at George Washington University in 2000, where he is currently Professor of Dance. Burgess designed and oversaw the implementation of a new, global distance and onsite learning MFA program for dance at the George Washington University in 2011. He chaired George Washington University's Department of Theatre and Dance from 2009 to 2017.

He has served on the board of Asian American Arts and Media and was a commissioner for the Commission for the Arts and Humanities for the District of Columbia and as a commissioner for Asian American and Pacific Islander (AAPI) Affairs for Washington, DC.

== Awards and recognitions ==
In 1994 he received the award for Outstanding Emerging Artist at the 12th Annual Mayor Arts Award Ceremony. His dance company was awarded the Mayor's Arts Award for Excellence in 2005. He has completed two senior Fulbrights in dance and won seven Metro D.C. Dance Awards as well as the Pola Nirenska Award.

He has been honored by the Smithsonian Institution and was a prominent feature in the Smithsonian exhibition "A Korean American Century" as part of the Korean American Centennial Celebration in 2003.

Stacy Taus-Bolstad mentioned Burgess and some of his career highlights in her 2005 book Koreans in America alongside comedian Margaret Cho under "Famous Korean Americans".

In 2009 Burgess was featured in advertisements for the "New 202" campaign produced by the D.C. Commission on the Arts and Humanities to highlight art and culture in the nation's capital.

He has been referred to as the "poet laureate of Washington dance".

In 2012 he was described as "not only a Washington prize, but a national dance treasure" by Pulitzer Prize winner Sarah Kaufman.

Since 2013, Burgess has been the first choreographer-in-residence at the Smithsonian National Portrait Gallery.

March 18, 2017 was declared Dana Tai Soon Burgess Day in Santa Fe, New Mexico.

A short documentary about Burgess and the dance company, with funding from the Humanities Council DC, called "Passages from the Journey", was premiered online in December 2020.

In February, 2021 he received the Aaron Stein Memorial Fund Award from the American Group Psychotherapy Association.

Burgess was the 2021 recipient of the Selma Jeanne Cohen Dance Lecture Award, presented by the Fulbright Association.

== Personal life ==
In 2011, "The Reliable Source" reported that Burgess became engaged to yoga teacher and playwright Jameson Freeman while touring the temple of Angkor Wat in Cambodia. The couple married in Santa Fe, New Mexico in September 2015. The mayor of Santa Fe later visited them at their Washington home to congratulate them. Freeman won the Democratic primary for the 86th district of the West Virginia House of Delegates in May, 2022. He lost in the general election to the Republican incumbent. In 2024, Freeman was the vice president of The Arts Club of Washington.
