= Sabrina Kay =

American Entrepreneur

- Born: Korea
- Education: University of Southern California & The Wharton School at University of Pennsylvania
- Occupation: Entrepreneur
- Years active: 2002–present
- Title: CEO, Chancellor
- Board member of: East West Bank, MannKind Corporation, Hagerty, Petersen Automotive Museum
- Children: 1
- Website: www.sabrinakay.com

Dr. Sabrina Kay is an American entrepreneur, corporate board member, investor, and philanthropist who has been involved in technology, education, fashion, leadership, banking, and finance. She pursued undergraduate studies in Computer Science and Mathematics at the California State University in Long Beach. She holds a doctorate degree from the University of Pennsylvania where she was a member of the inaugural class of Wharton School's Work-Based Learning Leadership program, a Master of Science in Education from the University of Pennsylvania Graduate School of Education, and an M.B.A. from the University of Southern California.

== Business ventures ==
She is CEO of Fremont Private Investments and a strategic partner of VSS Capital. She was a founder, Chancellor, and CEO of Fremont University, a private university she started for inner city youth while attending the Wharton School as a laboratory of her doctorate dissertation. Today, Fremont University provides MBA, Bachelor of Arts, Associate of Arts, Associate of Science degrees in the Technology, Healthcare, Business, and Paralegal programs and diplomas in wellness fields. She also founded California Design College (CDC), now The Art Institute of California – Hollywood and sold it to Education Management (NASDAQ: EDMC) in 2003. Other ventures she founded include Premier Business Bank (sold to First Foundation Bank, NASDAQ: FFWM in 2018), The Sabrina Kay Collection, Fashion Umbrella, and LAdesigns.

== Corporate boards ==
She serves as a member of the board of directors of East West Bank (NASDAQ: EWBC), Hagerty (NYSE: HGTY), MannKind (NASDAQ: MKND) and is an advisor to Panda Restaurant Group and the Cherng Family Trust. She also was a board member of Combined Properties, Galvanize (sold to NYSE: LRN), and Ex’pression College as well as being an advisor and board member of the various companies she invested in.

== Civic boards ==
She served as a Los Angeles City Planning Commissioner, Founding Commissioner of the California Scholarshare Investment Board, California's 529C plan, accreditation evaluator for ACICS, and evaluator for BPPE (Bureau for Private Postsecondary Education). She was the President of CAPPS (California Association of Private Postsecondary Schools), ICEPAC (Independent Coalition of Private Educators’ Political Action Committee), CCAPAC (Career College Association Political Action Committee) and board members of the Board of Governors of USC Alumni Association, USC Marshall School Board of Leaders, USC Korean American Studies Program, KAC (Korean American Coalition), ACDPUK (Advisory Council on Democratic & Peaceful Unification of Korea), and KACCLA (Korean American Chamber of Commerce of Los Angeles).

== Philanthropy and non-profit boards ==
She started the Sabrina Kay Charitable Foundation in 2002 and has been an active philanthropist in inner-city youth education and arts. She served as the chairman of After School All Stars Los Angeles for 20 years, beginning in 2002, and has been a board member of Petersen Automotive Museum, Los Angeles Sports and Entertainment Commission, and International Medical Corps Leadership Council. She has also served on the board of American Friends of the Louvre, the California Fashion Association, Getty House Foundation, Weingart Center, and Board of Leaders of USC Marshall School.

== Awards ==
Her achievements have been recognized with numerous awards, including the Visionary Award from Asia Society, Cedars Sinai Hospital, and Fashion Industries Guild, the Leadership Award from USC Asian Pacific Alumni Association, the Education Award from After-School All-Stars presented by former California Governor Arnold Schwarzenegger, United Nations Global Goals Award at the UN General Assembly by Novus Summit, the Humanitarian Award from International Medical Corps, and the Lifetime Education Leadership Award from Learning Consortium with Steve Wozniak and Sal Khan. She was inducted into the Hall of Fame by California Association for Private Postsecondary Schools, named Woman of the Year by the California Legislature, was named Rising Asian Woman by the World Affairs Council, and was a finalist for Entrepreneur of the Year by Ernst & Young.
