= Toraichi Kono =

Assistant to Charlie Chaplin (1885–1971)

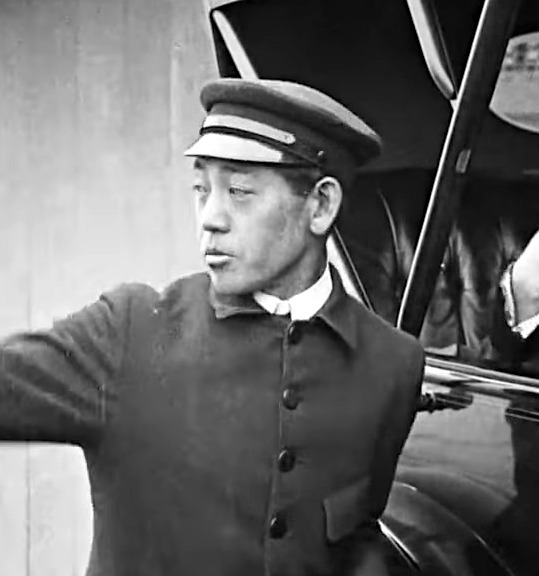
- Toraichi Kono in 1917
- Born: 1885; Hiroshima, Japan
- Died: 1971 (aged 85–86); Tokyo, Japan
- Occupations: Valet; Secretary
- Known for: Charlie Chaplin's valet and confidant

Toraichi Kono (高野虎市, Kōno Toraichi, 1885–1971) was the valet and secretary of Charlie Chaplin.

He appeared in three of Chaplin's films as the valet to Chaplin's characters, and he worked as a representative for United Artists. He was arrested by the FBI on suspicion of espionage in the lead-up to World War II, and he was held in an internment camp, before being released in 1949 and returning to Japan in the 1950s. Kono has been the subject of increasing historical interest, both for the insights that his papers have provided into Chaplin's complicated relationship with Japan, and because he was one of the few Asian residents of the United States to be active in the nascent American film industry.

== Life and career ==
Kono was born in Hiroshima in 1888. He grew up in Japan, before moving to Southern California by around 1904. Kono pursued training both as an airplane pilot and as a lawyer.

Kono met Charlie Chaplin and became his driver in 1916, and the two became friends. Kono performed in Chaplin's 1917 film The Adventurer, playing Chaplin's chauffeur, mirroring his job in real life. He appeared as Chaplin's driver in two of Chaplin's other films, but was not credited for his appearances. Kono remained an employee and confidant of Chaplin's for the following 18 years. Although how personally close they were is a matter of dispute, Kono's biographer Hiroyuki Ono cites letters addressed to Kono but meant for Chaplin as evidence that Kono served a role analogous to personal secretary or scheduler for Chaplin.

Kono provided one of the few firsthand accounts of the events leading up to the mysterious death of Thomas Ince in 1924.

In 1932, Chaplin went on a three-week trip to Japan with Sydney Chaplin, his brother and business manager, and Kono. Because the political situation in Japan was extremely volatile, Kono has been credited with helping Charlie and Sydney Chaplin to travel more safely through the country. They had a confrontation with members of the paramilitary Black Dragon Society, and shortly after they were with Takeru Inukai watching a sumo wrestling match when Inukai's father, prime minister Inukai Tsuyoshi, was assassinated by Black Dragon Society members. Subsequent information suggested that Chaplin himself may also have been targeted for assassination.

In 1934, Kono had an argument with Chaplin and Paulette Goddard, Chaplin's wife, which caused him to quit as Chaplin's valet. Chaplin instead named him as the Japan representative of Chaplin's production company, United Artists, but Kono quit after a year.

Before the attack on Pearl Harbor, Kono was arrested by the FBI for alleged social connections to Japanese spies. The FBI suspected that he was helping the Japanese navy to gather intelligence on U.S. battleships. The Japanese military strike on Pearl Harbor occurred while the United States was attempting to deport Kono to Japan, at which point he was relocated to the Kooskia Internment Camp. He was imprisoned until 1948.

Kono returned to Hiroshima in the 1950s. He died in 1971.

== Media ==
In 2004, Kono's second wife made boxes of Kono's papers and photographs available to Kono's biographer, Hiroyuki Ono, enabling much more thorough research into Kono's life and his relationship to Chaplin. Philip W. Chung wrote a play, My man Kono, which had its world premiere in February, 2025, at the A.R.T./NY Mezzanine Theater in NYC, performed by the Pan Asian Repertory Theater Company. In 2009, Hiroyuki Ono wrote a biography of Kono, called チャップリンの影: 日本人秘書高野虎市 (Shadow of Chaplin: Japanese Secretary Toraichi Kono). Kono was also discussed in depth by Makino Mamoru in the book Chaplin among the ashes.
