= Sook Nyul Choi =

American novelist

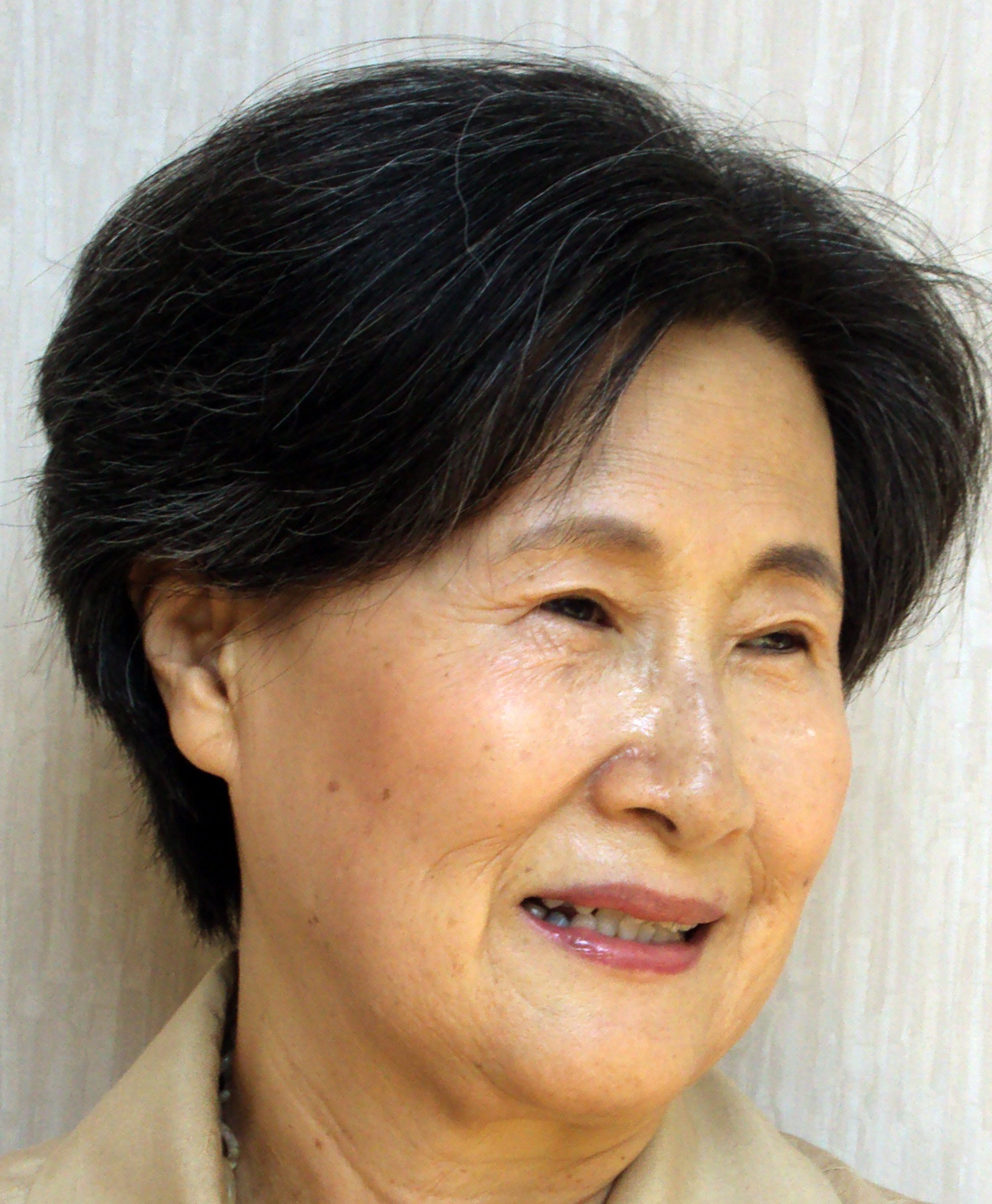
- Sook Nyul Choi, 2009
- Born: 1937 (age 88–89); Pyongyang, Korea
- Writing career
- Genre: Children's literature

- Sook Nyul Choi
- Hangul: 최숙렬
- Hanja: 崔淑烈
- RR: Choe Sukryeol
- MR: Ch'oe Sungnyŏl

Sook Nyul Choi (Korean: 최숙렬; born 1937) is a Korean American children's storybook author.

== Writing ==
Choi's native language is Korean. Choi writes about her own experiences as a young refugee from North Korea during the Korean War through her heroines in her books. She said, "I now have two countries, my native country of Korea, and my adopted country, the United States. Through my writing, I want to bring to life the history and culture of Korea to share with all my American friends."

In her first young adult book, The Year of Impossible Goodbyes (1991), Choi writes about 10-year-old Sookan's life and her family during the brutal Japanese occupation of the Korean Peninsula. When World War II ends, the Russian Army occupies the area north of the 38th Parallel thus creating Communist North Korea. This is the story of Sookan's life under the Japanese and Russian Occupation, and her harrowing escape from North Korea to South Korea in search of freedom.

The book won numerous awards including Best Books for Young Adults, ALA Notable Book and Judy Lopez Book Award by the National Women's Book Association. It has been translated into several languages including Korean, French, Italian, and Japanese. It is also available in Braille and in audio book.

Her books can be used not only to promote reading and writing, but also to tie literature into the social studies curriculum in middle schools, high schools, and also political science at the college level. Choi's books explore themes of communism, freedom, international politics, and interaction among nations. They can be used to teach about socio-geopolitical events and historical realities of Asian nations, including how big powers affect the fate of small nations.

Choi's works are also featured in many literary books and reference books for educators.

- Oxford Companion to Women's Writing, edited by Cathy N. Davidson, Linda Wagner-Martin
- Contemporary Authors by Gale Group, Volume 197
- Author and Artists for Young Adult, by Gale Group, Volume 38
- Multicultural Voices in Contemporary Literature: a Resource for Teachers, by Frances Ann Day
- Themes in Reading: a Multicultural Collection, by Jamestown Publishers, Volume 1
- Eight Book of Junior Authors and Illustrators, edited by Connie G Rockman
- Something About the Authors, Volume 73, 126, 131, by Gale Group
- Children's Literature Reviews, by Gale Group, edited by Deborah J Morad
- Literature Works, Collection 3, Book 1, by Silver Burdett Ginn
- Houghton Mifflin Reading by Horizons
- Celebrate: Invitation to Literature, by Houghton Mifflin
- Lecture Reading, My Time to Shine, Siego Yo, Siego Yo!, by Scott Foresman
- Yellow Light, edited by Amy Ling
- Themes in Reading: a Multicultural Connection, Volume 1, by Jamestown Publishing, a resource for teachers
- Asia Pacific Reader, by Madeline Mattarozzi Laming, Oxford University Press
- Asian American Authors, by Kathi Ishizuka
- Encuentros Maravillosos, Serie de Español para La Escuela Elemental, Pearson Educación

== Personal life ==
Choi was born in Pyongyang, now part of North Korea. During the Korean War, she fled to South Korea. She emigrated to the United States to pursue higher education, earning her B.A. from Manhattanville College in 1962 and becoming a school teacher in New York. She later moved to Cambridge, Massachusetts, where she began working as a writer, lecturer, and creative writing teacher. She is the widow of Nung Ho Choi, with whom she had two daughters. The older daughter, Kathleen Choi, was a child actress on Sesame Street and Romper Room, and in 1993 went on to marry John J. H. Kim of Fort Lee, New Jersey, the great-grandson of Korean prime minister Kim Hong-jip. The younger daughter Audrey Choi was formerly chief-of-staff of the Council of Economic Advisers, and married Robert C. Orr, an aide to Richard Holbrooke, in 2000. Choi was also featured in Audrey's 2016 TED Talk titled, How to Make a Profit While Making a Difference.

== Books ==
- Year of the Impossible Goodbyes. New York: Dell, 1991, ISBN 0-440-40759-1
- Echoes of the White Giraffe, Houghton Mifflin, 1993
- Halmoni and the Picnic, Houghton Mifflin Books for Children, 1993
- Gathering of Pearls, Houghton Mifflin, 1994
- The Best Older Sister, Delacorte Books for Young Readers, 1997
- Yunmi and Halmoni's Trip, Houghton Mifflin, 1997, ISBN 0-395-81180-5

== Awards ==
Book	Awards
Year of the Impossible Goodbyes	Judy Lopez Book Award by the National Women's Book Association, 1992. Selected for "Best Books for Young Adults" list by the Young Adult Library Services Association (YALSA); Selected for "Best Books for the Teen Age 1992" list by the New York Public Library for young people, ages 12–18. American Library Association Notable Book; Selected for "Bulletin Blue Ribbon for 1991" by the Bulletin of the Center for Children's Books; A "Hungry Mind Review" Book of Distinction; State Book Awards Master Reading Lists: States of Alabama, Kansas, Maine, Utah, Vermont, Illinois, Georgia, and Indiana. School Library Journal List of "One Hundred Books Too Good to Miss", 1998.
Echoes of the White Giraffe	State Book Award Master Reading List: Tennessee
Halmoni and the Picnic	Silver Burdett Gin Textbook Series; Featured on the Reading Rainbow television series Important Books for the 1990s, Whole Language Teaching Association; Skippig Stones Honor Award, 1994
Gathering of Pearls	1995 Books for the Teen Age Award
Other Awards	Tribute to Women Award by YWCA, Cambridge, MA 1992 Korea Foundation Fellowship Award, 1998 Fulbright Scholar Award, 2004 Ewha High School Alumni Art and Literature Award, 2004 Author of the Year, Children's Books by Boston Public Library, 2008 Literary Lights for Children Award by Associates of the Boston Public Library, 2009 Distinguished Alumni Award of Manhattanville College, 2012
