= Jung-Min Lee =

South Korean-American medical oncologist and physician-scientist

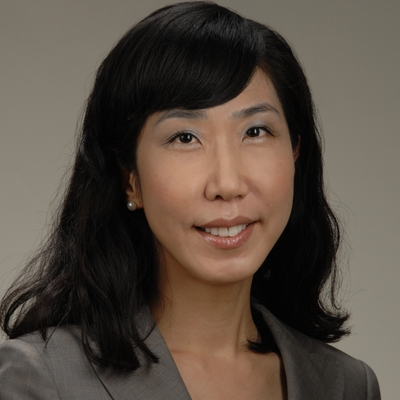
- Education: Yonsei University (MD)
- Scientific career
- Fields: Medical oncology, clinical trials, drug development
- Workplaces: National Cancer Institute

Jung-Min Lee is a South Korean-American medical oncologist and physician-scientist focused on the early clinical drug development and translational studies of targeted agents in BRCA mutation-associated breast or ovarian cancer, high-grade epithelial ovarian cancer, and triple-negative breast cancer. She is a senior investigator in the Women's Malignancies Branch at the National Cancer Institute.

== Early life and education ==
Lee is a earned a MD at Yonsei University Wonju College of Medicine. She completed a residency in internal medicine at Holy Family Hospital, Catholic University of Korea. At the age of 26, she immigrated to the United States. Lee conducted a research fellowship in pathology and cell biology at Thomas Jefferson University and residency training in internal medicine at the Albert Einstein College of Medicine. She completed a clinical research fellowship on breast cancer functional imaging at the Memorial Sloan Kettering Cancer Center. From 2008 to 2012, Lee was a medical oncology and hematology fellow at the National Cancer Institute's (NCI) Medical Oncology Branch (MOB).

== Career and research ==
Lee has been a NIH Lasker Clinical Research Scholar since 2016. Lee studies BRCA mutation-mediated cancers such as ovarian and breast cancer. In 2012, Lee became an assistant clinical investigator at NCI and joined the Molecular Signaling Section/Women's Cancers Clinic, MOB, to investigate potential biomarkers and develop rational combinations of targeted therapies for rare subsets of women's cancers. Lee is a participating member in the Gynecologic Oncology Group, American Association for Cancer Research, American Society for Clinical Oncology, and the Breast and Gynecologic Malignancies Faculty of the NCI Center for Cancer Research (CCR).

Lee's research is focused on clinical drug development and translational studies of targeted agents in BRCA mutation-associated breast or ovarian cancer, high-grade epithelial ovarian cancer, and triple negative breast cancer, as these diseases share similar molecular abnormalities. Her clinical and translational research interests include examining the hypothesis of clinical synergy of the combination of targeting key proteins in the DNA damage repair pathways, cell cycle, tumor microenvironment, and immune check points in clinical trials, incorporating collected patient tissue and blood samples. She is the principal investigator of ongoing phase 1 and 2 studies, with a PARP inhibitor (olaparib) in combination with carboplatin or cediranib, and other biologic agents. Lee's clinical trial is the first to test the modulation of immune-checkpoint activity by increasing the antigenic microenvironment with active targeted therapy. Her research has expanded to include the use of CRISPR-Cas9 mediated therapeutic editing of genes involved in disease causing such as PARP1, Rpe65 and Mct8.

Additionally, Lee has published clinical guidelines for the management of acromegaly, adrenal incidenteloma, and atrial fibrillation.

== Awards and honors ==
Lee was awarded the 2011 Jane C. Wright M.D. Young Investigator Award from the American Society of Clinical Oncology and the 2012 New York Ovarian Cancer Research Award from the Foundation for Women's Cancers.
