= Philip W. Chung =

Korean American playwright and artistic director

- Occupations: Playwright, Screenwriter, Producer

Philip W. Chung is a Korean American writer/producer, co-founder of Los Angeles-based Lodestone Theatre Ensemble and was its co-artistic director.

== Career ==
Chung has written and produced for theatre, film and television. He was the Co-founder/Artistic Director of the Asian American theatre company Lodestone Theatre Ensemble and is the current creative director for director Justin Lin's company YOMYOMF. His producing projects include the upcoming LGBTQ-themed horror film Moonshadow, the Stage 13/HBO Max Asian food series Family Style, Google's first 360 degree live-action film Help directed by Justin Lin (also Writer), the U.S.-China co-production Hollywood Adventures starring Zhao Wei (Co-Producer and Co-Writer), the Artbound/PBS documentary East West Players: A Home On Stage (Consulting Producer), and the Karen Gillan-starring indie film Late Bloomers (Associate Producer).

Chung has taught Asian American studies courses at UC Santa Cruz and playwriting at the L.A. Cultural Affairs Dept. and the Asian American Writers Workshop.

His play My Man Kono about the life of Charlie Chaplin's Japanese American valet Toraichi Kono premieres off-Broadway in NYC in 2025. His play Unbroken Blossoms, about the making of the 1919 D.W. Griffith-directed silent film Broken Blossoms told from the pov of the film's Chinese American consultants (James B. Leong and Moon Kwan), premieres at East West Players summer 2024.

He is also writing features for Netflix and Buzzfeed Studios.

== Plays ==
- Home is Where the Han Is
- Laughter, Joy & Loneliness & Sex & Sex & Sex & Sex
- Dead of Night
- Aziatik Nation '04
- The Golden Hour
- One Nation, Under God
- My Man Kono
- Unbroken Blossoms
- Grace Kim & The Spiders From Mars
