= Kim Yoo-yeon (sport shooter) =

South Korean sport shooter

Personal information
- Nationality: South Korea
- Born: 30 March 1982 (age 44) Seoul, South Korea
- Height: 1.53 m (5 ft 0 in)
- Weight: 43 kg (95 lb)

Korean name
- Hangul: 김유연
- RR: Gim Yuyeon
- MR: Kim Yuyŏn

Sport
- Sport: Shooting
- Event: 50 m rifle 3 positions (STR3X20)
- Coached by: Yang Kwang-suk

Kim Yoo-yeon (Korean: 김유연; born March 30, 1982, in Seoul) is a South Korean sport shooter. Kim represented South Korea at the 2008 Summer Olympics in Beijing. where she competed in the women's 50 m rifle 3 positions. She was able to shoot 193 targets in a prone position, 181 in standing, and 195 in kneeling, for a total score of 569 points, finishing in thirty-fourth place.
