= Michael Kim (trial lawyer) =

American lawyer

- Born: South Korea
- Education: Harvard College; Harvard Law School
- Occupation: Trial lawyer
- Employer(s): Kobre & Kim

Michael Kim is an American trial lawyer and co-founder of Kobre & Kim, a litigation focused law firm.

Born in Korea, Kim emigrated to the United States when he was 13. By the age of 29, Kim had graduated from Harvard College and Harvard Law School, to work as a prosecutor in US Attorney's Office in the Southern District of New York. During his tenure one of his most important cases was the prosecution of the $75 million Sterling Foster scam, a crime that would be the inspiration for the movie Boiler Room.

Before settling in New York City, Kim spent time living in Dubai, Europe, and Costa Rica, where he learned to speak fluent Spanish. He also served as a U.S. Army infantry officer.

In the summer of 2003, alongside colleague Steven Kobre from the US Attorney's Office, Kim opened the litigation firm Kobre & Kim, which focused exclusively on disputes and investigations. Their entrepreneurship turned out to be a ground-breaking achievement as it was the first time in 20 years that alumni from the US Attorney's Office in Manhattan had started their own firm immediately after government service. Since then, the firm has expanded from New York to a total of 15 locations including Buenos Aires, Chicago, Delaware, Miami, San Francisco, São Paulo, Washington DC, Hong Kong, Seoul, Shanghai, London, Tel Aviv, the British Virgin Islands, and the Cayman Islands. Kim relocated to Seoul in 2015 to focus on disputes and investigations in Korea.

Kim has been involved in various litigations including defending Brian Hunter, an energy trader, who faced an enforcement action brought by the Federal Energy Regulatory Commission; advising the Commonwealth of the Northern Mariana Islands in seeking to recover over US$100 million in unpaid taxes from the founder of ComputerLand Corp., William H. Millard; and obtaining a US$30 million award on behalf of U.S. Airways against Oppenheimer & Co., Inc. before a Financial Industry Regulatory Authority arbitration panel in New York.

He was profiled in a New York Times article on the growing corporate outing practice of shooting at a range. Kim was quoted as saying "we do very aggressive litigation and trial work so we prefer an activity that dovetails nicely with that aggressive culture, and hitting a little white ball on the greens doesn't do much for us."
