= Thai Lee =

Korean American billionaire businesswoman

- Born: 1958 (age 67–68); Bangkok, Thailand
- Education: Amherst College (BA); Harvard Business School (MBA)
- Known for: CEO and co-founder, SHI International
- Term: 1989–present
- Spouse: Leo Koguan (m. 1989–2002)
- Children: 2
- Parent: Daniel Kie-Hong Lee
- Relatives: Margaret Lee (older sister)

Thai Lee (born 1958) is a Thai-born Korean-American billionaire businesswoman, the co-owner, CEO and president of SHI International, reported by Forbes to be the largest woman-owned business in the US in 2012. In May 2025, she was worth US$5.8 billion. She is a member of the board of directors of the Committee for Human Rights in North Korea.

== Early years ==
Thai Lee was born in 1958 in Bangkok, Thailand, but spent most of her childhood in South Korea. Her family moved frequently due to her father's job as a Korean economist promoting South Korea's postwar development plan. Lee moved to the United States in her teens and attended high school in Amherst. She attended Amherst College in Amherst, Massachusetts, earning a double major BA in biology and economics in 1980. She followed in the footsteps of her father, who was the first Korean student to graduate from Amherst College in 1950. Lee went on to earn an MBA from Harvard Business School in 1985. She was the first Korean woman to graduate from the business school. Lee served as the first female president of the Amherst College Alumni Society from 2004 to 2005.

== Awards and recognition ==
- Life trustee, Amherst College
- Former president, Amherst College Alumni Society
- Harvard University, Dean's Advisory Board
- Distinguished Alumni Award, Harvard Business School
- Ernst & Young's Entrepreneur of the Year in 2012
- Trustee emeritus, Amherst College
- Harvard Business School, 2013 Alumni Achievement Award

== Family ==
In 1989, Lee married Leo Koguan, a Columbia University graduate, New York Law School-educated lawyer and the co-founder and chairman of SHI. They divorced in 2002.

She has two children. She lives in Austin, Texas.
