= Hyun Yi Kang =

Korean-American scholar and writer (born 1967)

Laura Hyun Yi Kang (born 1967) is a Korean-American scholar and writer.

Kang is a professor of gender and sexuality studies in the School of Humanities at University of California, Irvine. Kang holds a B.A. in ethnic studies and English from UC Berkeley and a Ph.D. from UC Santa Cruz.

== Selected works ==
- Traffic in Asian Women, Duke University Press, 2020
- Writing Self, Writing Nation: A Collection of Essays on Dictee by Theresa Hak Kyung Cha, Third Women Press, 1994 (contributor)
- Compositional Subjects: Enfiguring Asian/American Women, Duke University Press, 2002
- Echoes upon Echoes: New Korean American Writings, Temple Univ Press, 2003 (co-editor)
- Conjuring "Comfort Women": Mediated Affiliations and Disciplined Subjects in Korean/American Transnationality, Journal of Asian American Studies - Volume 6, Number 1, February 2003, pp. 25–55

== Awards ==
- Association of Asian American Studies Book Award in Cultural Studies 2003
- UC Irvine Chancellor's Award for Excellence in Undergraduate Research 1998
