= Minsoo Kang =

Korean historian (born 1967)

- Born: 1967 (age 58–59)
- Occupations: Historian, essayist, short story writer
- Writing career
- Notable works: Of Tales and Enigmas, Sublime Dreams of Living Machines: The Automaton in the European Imagination

Minsoo Kang (born 1967) is a historian and writer. Currently, he is an associate professor of European intellectual history in the Department of History at the University of Missouri–St. Louis. Kang is also an expert on the history of automata in science and in fiction.

Kang has published numerous books and articles on European history. In 'Of Tales and Enigmas', a collection of his essays and short stories, Kang adopts the styles of Western genre fiction to explore his personal vision of Korean history, which creates a surrealistic landscape where histories, ideas, and legends freely and harmoniously intermingle.

== Early life ==
Minsoo Kang was born in Seoul, South Korea. His father is a South Korean diplomat and his mother is a professor of French literature. In accordance with the international nature of his father's job, Kang grew up in Korea, Austria, New Zealand, Iran, Germany, Brunei, and other places for shorter periods. He is fluent in Korean and English, and can read in German and French.

Kang graduated from the University of Southern California in 1988 with a B.A. in Interdisciplinary Studies of History, Philosophy, and Religion; he received his M.A. and Ph.D. degrees in European History from University of California, Los Angeles in 1991 and 2004, respectively.

== Academic work ==
Kang is an expert on the history of automata. His book Sublime Dreams of Living Machines looks at automata in the European imagination throughout history. While covering a broad history of golems, talking heads, mechanical ducks, and so forth, Kang pursues questions regarding how automata fit the historical periods that created them.

Kang is an assistant professor of Modern European history with a concentration in eighteenth and nineteenth century France, Britain, and Germany. His research focuses on intellectual and cultural history, the history of science and technology, and global history pertaining to interactions between Europeans and East Asians in the early modern period. He has also written several essays on Korean history focusing on the transition from the late Goryeo dynasty to the early Joseon.

Kang's work often explores the relationship between history and fiction. His master's thesis, The Intrusion of History: The Novels of Milan Kundera in the Context of Czechoslovak History pursued the idea of using literature for the study of history. He also studies film, historical novels, and science fiction as history.

== The Melancholy of Untold History: A Novel ==
In 2024, his book The Melancholy of Untold History: A Novel was published. The novel received a positive review in Paste Magazine, with Alana Joli Abbott praising Minsoo's use of prose as well as his ability to weave "philosophy and mythology and grief together until they feel as though they’re perfect companions." In the Korea Times, cultural critic David Tizzard said that the book is "pulling at the fabric of our reality" while creating something "careful, abstract, innovative, and erudite."

== Bibliography ==
=== Fiction and short stories ===
- Of Tales and Enigmas, Prime, 2006
- Three Stories: Lady Faraway, The Well of Dreams, The Dilemma of the King and the Beggar; Magazine: Lady Churchill's Rosebud Wristlet 22, 2002
- A Fearful Symmetry, in Ellen Datlow, Kelly Link and Gavin J Grant eds., The Year's Best Fantasy and Horror 2007, St. Martins, New York, 2007
- The Melancholy of Untold History: A Novel, 2024, William Morrow,

=== Nonfiction ===
- Visions of the Industrial Age, Ashgate, 2008
- Sublime Dreams of Living Machines: The Automaton in the European Imagination, Harvard University Press, 2011

=== Essays and articles ===
- De la Sagesse Inaboutie du Barbare: Un Erudit Confucéen Lit la vie de Saint Ignace, in Daniel S. Milo, Alain Boureau ed., Alter Histoire: Essais d’Histoire Expérimentale, Les Belles Lettres, Paris, 1991
- Review of Das Schreckliche Mädchen, in The American Historical Review 96, 4, 1991
- Review of Hard Times and Culture - Fin de Siécle Vienna, in The American Historical Review 97, 4, 1992
- The Moderns: Art, Forgery, and a Postmodern Narrative of Modernism, in Robert Rosenstone ed., Revisioning History, Princeton University Press, Princeton, 1995
- How to Keep Heaven's Mandate, The Times Literary Supplement, June 19, 1998
- Ten Short Essays on Korea, AZ 1, 1, 1999
- Gyungbok Palace: History, Controversy, Geomancy, Manoa 11, 1, 1999
- Reading Dutch, Rethinking History 4, 3, Winter 2000
- The Use of Dreaming for the Study of History, Rethinking History 5, 2, Summer 2001
- Review of John E. Wills Jr.’s 1688: A Global History, Rethinking History 5, 3, Winter 2001
- Wonders of Mathematical Magic: Lists of Automata in the Transition from Magic to Science, 1533–1662, Comitatus: A Journal of Medieval and Renaissance Studies 33, 2002
- Building the Sex Machine: the Subversive Fantasy of the Female Robot, Intertexts, 9, 2, 2006
- The Ambivalent Power of the Robot, Antenna: The Journal of Nature in Visual Culture, 9, March 21, 2009.
- Review of Walter L. Abramson's Embattled Avant-Gardes: Modernism's Resistance to Commodity Culture, Journal of World History, June 2009.

== Honor ==
- The Year's Best Fantasy and Horror 2007 in Ellen Datlow, Kelly Link and Gavin J Grant eds (for short story: A Fearful Symmetry)

== See also ==
- List of Asian American writers
