= Soko Glam =

Online beauty marketplace

- Company type: Private company
- Industry: Skin care
- Founded: 2012; 14 years ago
- Founders: Charlotte Cho, David K. Cho
- Headquarters: New York City, US
- Area served: Worldwide
- Website: Sokoglam.com

Soko Glam (SokoGlam!) is an online marketplace that specializes in Korean beauty products. The company was founded in 2012 by Charlotte Cho and David K. Cho, and is considered one of the biggest providers of K-Beauty products in the US.

== History ==
Soko Glam was founded on 1 December 2012 by esthetician and author Charlotte Cho and Businessman David K. Cho. The couple met in 2008 while in Seoul, South Korea, and began curating Korean beauty products to the U.S. marketplace. Soko Glam operates as an online retailer of Korean beauty products and treatments, specializing in Skin Care, hair, and makeup. The company has recently expanded to become one of the biggest firms in the U.S. to specialize in K-Beauty products and treatments. Soko Glam currently distributes globally from its headquarters in New York City, US.

== See also ==
- Charlotte Cho
- K-Beauty
