= Peter Ahn =

American missionary

Peter Pyungchoo Ahn (May 21, 1917 – August 13, 2003) was a Korean-born missionary of the United Methodist Church. He served as pastor of San Francisco Korean United Methodist Church from 1953 until 1960. Ahn earned his Ph.D. (1962) from Boston University, and was one of the original translators of the New American Standard Bible.
