= SHI International Corp =

American IT company

SHI International Corp.
- Type: Private
- Industry: B2B, IT products and services
- Founded: November 1989
- Founder: Thai Lee and Leo KoGuan
- Headquarters: Somerset, New Jersey, United States
- Area served: Worldwide
- Owner: Thai Lee, CEO and President
- Number of employees: 6,000 employees
- Website: www.shi.com

SHI International Corp. (commonly referred to as SHI), headquartered in Somerset, New Jersey, is a privately owned provider of IT infrastructure, end-user computing, cybersecurity, and IT optimization products and services. SHI has customers in the non-profit, private, and public sectors. It has 6,000 employees across more than 35 offices in the United States, Canada, France, Hong Kong, Singapore, and the United Kingdom. SHI has amassed 17,000 customers, including companies such as Boeing, Johnson & Johnson and AT&T.

SHI operates two integration centers in Piscataway, New Jersey (Knox – 305,000-sq. ft. and Ridge – 400,000-sq. ft.), along with three international integration centers (Nexus in the U.K., Tiel in the Netherlands, and Tampines in Singapore).

== History ==
SHI was founded in November 1989 by Thai Lee and Leo KoGuan (co-founder and chairman of the board).

In 2016, SHI acquired Eastridge, a Microsoft services provider.

In Q1 of 2017, SHI launched AWS Support Services for public cloud and forecasts, managing over $1 billion in customers' Microsoft Cloud assets in 2017.

In 2017, SHI acquired eTelligent Solutions, Inc. (ESI), the maker of the cloud-based Technology Asset Management (TAM) platform.

In 2018, Sonde Health Inc., an affiliate of PureTech Health appointed SHI's president and CEO, Thai Lee, to its board of directors.

In 2019, SHI signed a seven-year naming rights partnership with Rutgers University's football stadium in Piscataway, New Jersey (now known as SHI Stadium).

In 2020, SHI's Austin, Texas, office moved into Garza Ranch to keep pace with the company's growth.

In 2020, SHI launched Stratascale, a new subsidiary focused on delivering digital agility and technology consulting.

In July 2022, SHI was shut down for a week due to a cyber attack.

In 2022, SHI Healthcare launched.

In 2022, SHI became an official technology partner of the LPGA Tour.

In 2023, LPGA Tour golfers Allisen Corpuz and Annie Park became official SHI brand ambassadors.

== Operations ==
=== Recent public contracts ===
==== 2024 ====
In March 2024, SHI signed a multi-year cooperative purchasing contract with Sourcewell, a State of Minnesota local government agency and service cooperative. This contract enables state and local governments, public and private K-12 schools, colleges and universities, and nonprofit organizations nationwide to procure SHI software, hardware, and a full range of technology solutions and professional services.

Through Sourcewell’s procurement process, eligible agencies gain streamlined access to SHI’s offerings—delivering purchasing across product categories including cloud services, peripherals, networking, security, data center solutions, esports and library furniture, STEM and STEAM technology, and more.

==== 2022 ====
In July 2022, SHI signed a multi-year NASPO ValuePoint Software Value-Added Reseller (SVAR) contract enabling states, cities, counties, municipalities, special districts, K-12 schools, colleges and universities, and quasi-government and nonprofit organizations full access and ability to procure SHI software and a range of supporting services.

==== 2021 ====
In October 2021, SHI signed a four-year contract with the Indiana Department of Administration to provide desktops, laptops, tablets, monitors, printers, peripherals, and lifecycle management services to the state's government agencies and educational institutions.

==== 2020 ====
In August 2020, SHI was awarded a prime contract for Army ITES-SW2, which allows the Army to procure software and related services.

In May 2020, SHI was awarded a prime contract for NASA SEWP V Category A&D, which allows all federal agencies to procure IT services, hardware, software, and a variety of speciality IT offerings.

In March 2020, SHI signed a multi-year Sourcewell contract that provides increased administrative efficiencies and competitive purchasing options to state and local government and K-12 and higher education institutions across the public sector agency spectrum.

==== 2019 ====
In February 2019, SHI signed a GSA IT Schedule 70 contract that allows all federal, state, and local entities to procure IT services, hardware, software, and a variety of speciality IT offerings.

==== 2018 ====
In November 2018, SHI was awarded a prime contract for DoD ESI Microsoft, which allows Department of Defense agencies, the intelligence community, the United States Coast Guard, and foreign military sales the ability to procure Microsoft-related products and offerings.

In November 2018, SHI won a spot on a 10-year, $3.17 billion blanket purchase agreement from the U.S. Navy to provide worldwide perpetual licenses and annual subscriptions for Microsoft-made software products to the Defense Department, intelligence community, and U.S. Coast Guard.

== Ownership ==
SHI is owned by billionaire co-founders and former spouses Thai Lee and Leo Koguan. Lee is the CEO and president of the company and KoGuan is the non-executive chairman; he is also Tesla, Inc.'s third largest private shareholder after Elon Musk and Larry Ellison.

SHI is the largest Minority- and Woman-Owned Business Enterprise (MWBE) in the U.S. In 2023, it was named one of America's Best Midsize Employers by Forbes. In 2020, it was included on Forbes' list of America's Best Employers for Women.
