= Howard Choi =

American physician

Howard Choi is a physician in the United States and the principal editor of a physical medicine and rehabilitation (PM&R) handbook, PM&R Pocketpedia, and a companion book, Pain Medicine Pocketpedia. Award for Choi include the American Medical Association Foundation Leadership Award (2001) and the Foundation for PM&R New Investigator Award (2004).

== Medical education ==
Choi graduated from SUNY Downstate Medical Center in 1997 and received a Master's in Public Health from the Harvard School of Public Health in 2004. After completing a residency in PM&R at the Johns Hopkins University School of Medicine in 2001, Choi completed additional training as a clinical fellow in spinal cord injury medicine at VA Boston Healthcare System/Harvard Medical School.

== Career ==
Choi is an assistant professor of rehabilitation medicine at Mount Sinai School of Medicine.

== Publications ==
- Choi H, Binder DS, Oropilla ML, Bernotus EE, Konya D, Nee MA, Tammaro EA, Sabharwal S (2006). "Evaluation of selected laboratory components of a comprehensive periodic health evaluation for veterans with spinal cord injury and disorders". Arch Phys Med Rehabil. 87 (5): 603–10. doi:10.1016/j.apmr.2006.02.001. PMID 16635621.
- Choi H, Liao WL, Newton KM, Onario RC, King AM, Desilets FC, Woodard EJ, Eichler ME, Frontera WR, Sabharwal S, Teng YD (2005). "Respiratory abnormalities resulting from midcervical spinal cord injury and their reversal by serotonin 1A agonists in conscious rats". J Neurosci. 25 (18): 4550–9. doi:10.1523/JNEUROSCI.5135-04.2005. PMC 6725034. PMID 15872102.

== Books ==
- Choi H, Sugar R, Fish D, Shatzer M, Krabak B. PM&R Pocketpedia. Lippincott Williams and Wilkins (2003). ISBN 0-7817-4433-4
- Kim HS, Fish D, Choi H. Pain Medicine Pocketpedia. Lippincott Williams and Wilkins (2011). ISBN 0-7817-7218-4, ISBN 978-0-7817-7218-1
