= Fullerton Boys =

Korean American gang in Fullerton, United States

- Founded: 1996
- Founding location: Fullerton, California
- Territory: Orange thorpe
- Ethnicity: Korean Americans
- Activities: sale of drugs, protection money
- Allies: Wah Ching
- Rivals: Surenos

Fullerton Boys, commonly spelled Fullerton Boyz, is a group of gang members mostly composed of Korean-American delinquents that lived in the city of Fullerton, California. Most of its members belonged to the LVM gang, SZA gang (Sarzana) gang and some from the Wah Ching gang. These gang members were known to also claim Fullerton Boyz against their rivals and as the gangs disbanded in Fullerton, most of them started to claim Fullerton Boyz as a gang.

== See also ==
- Gangs in the United States
