= Corina Knoll =

American editor and journalist

Corina Knoll is an American editor and journalist who is the Los Angeles bureau chief of The New York Times. Before joining The New York Times in 2019, she worked for more than a decade for the Los Angeles Times.

== Career ==
Earlier in her career, Knoll covered US Soccer for ESPN Soccernet.com, with her first article about Dax McCarty titled "McCarty pursues his passion" being published on January 19, 2006. Knoll also worked in the public relations department of the Minnesota Timberwolves of the National Basketball Association. She worked in sports marketing before pursuing a freelance writing career. She was soon hired by the magazine KoreAm Journal, assuming the roles of senior writer and senior editor. She was managing editor of the magazine from February 2007 to March 2008.

In 2023, she won the Excellence in Written Reporting – News Award from the Asian American Journalists Association.

== Personal life ==
Knoll is a Korean adoptee who was raised in Iowa and graduated from Macalester College.
