= Nic Cha Kim =

- Born: September 19, 1974 (age 51); Lakewood, California
- Occupations: Documentary filmmaker, television reporter, playwright, activist
- Years active: 2000–present
- Website: NicChaKim.com

Nic Cha Kim (born September 19, 1974) is an American television reporter, documentary filmmaker, playwright, and cultural activist, also known as the Founder of Gallery Row in Downtown Los Angeles.

Kim is a reporter for the weekly news series SoCal Connected, a weekly news series on KCET. In 2017, Nic won two Los Angeles Emmys for Information Segment and Informational Series (More Than 50% Remote).

== Early life ==
Kim was born in Lakewood, California but was raised in Arcadia, California. After graduating from Arcadia High School in 1992, Kim studied English at University of California, Berkeley but dropped out in 1998 and moved to Los Angeles.

== Career ==
=== Gallery Row ===
In 2003, Nic Cha Kim presented a proposal with friend Kjell Hagen to create an arts and culture district called Gallery Row through parts of Civic Center, Historic Core, and Fashion District in Downtown Los Angeles. Co-sponsored by Jan Perry and Antonio Villaraigosa, Los Angeles City Council voted unanimously to designate Gallery Row on July 23, 2003 (Council File Indes: 03-1571).

Once the City of L.A. approved the district, Kim started Gallery Row Organization with a mission to create a thriving, pedestrian-friendly, culturally abundant, urban neighborhood. Gallery Row spans north–south along Main Street and Spring Street from 2nd Street in the north to 9th Street in the south. There are now over 40 art galleries in Gallery Row and the monthly Downtown Art Walk attracts over 30,000 visitors. Gallery Row Organization brought new art galleries into Downtown Los Angeles through economic development programs, introduced new signage to promote the Gallery Row district, produced cultural events with local community leaders, and curated the first TAP Card design competition for the Los Angeles Department of Transportation.

=== Niche.LA Video Art ===
In 2005, Kim opened the first art gallery in Los Angeles dedicated to video art. Based in Gallery Row, Niche.LA Video Art exhibited over 50 art shows curating video art, digital art, 3D mapping, glitch, dadamoshing, cyberart, nanoart, fractal art, and light art. A regular participant of the monthly Downtown Art Walk, Kim often used his gallery to convince creative entrepreneurs to open art galleries in Gallery Row to become part of the Downtown L.A. art scene. Kim closed the gallery in 2012 to pursue documentary filmmaking.

=== Art Battle L.A. ===
Produced by Nic Cha Kim, Art Battle L.A. is a 52 min. street art documentary that chronicles graffiti artists Mear One, Man One, Inkie, and Eine as they spend a week together painting murals all over Los Angeles under the direction of L.A. Freewalls to support Hollywood Arts, a nonprofit dedicated to helping emancipated foster children living in the streets by teaching them employable arts skills. Art Battle L.A. premiered on KCET's Open Call and is currently available on Snagfilms.

=== Songs in the Key of Los Angeles: The Bedrock Sessions ===
Songs in the Key of Los Angeles: The Bedrock Sessions is a multi-platform collaboration between KCET, Library Foundation of Los Angeles, the Los Angeles Public Library, and USC professor Josh Kun that brings to life the Library's Southern California Sheet Music Collection. Consisting of sheet music pieces that range from the 1840s through the 1950s, the Collection offers a singular portrait of Los Angeles history and culture rendered in music and visual art. Produced by Nic Cha Kim, KCET presented a 5-part short documentary series featuring musicians Aloe Blacc, Petrojvic Blasting Company, Julia Holter, I See Hawks in L.A., and La Santa Cecilia that aired together as a special on KCET's transmedia arts and culture series, Artbound.

=== Teatro Jornalero Sin Fronteras ===
Co-Directed and Co-Produced by Nic Cha Kim, Teatro Jornalero Sin Fronteras follows deported and displaced Guatemalans as they reintegrate back into their home country. Day Labor Theater Without Borders is a program of Cornerstone Theater Company where they perform plays based on stories from day labor communities. Teatro Jornalero Sin Fronteras was nominated for the 67th Los Angeles area Local Emmy in 2015 in the Feature Segment category.

=== SoCal Connected ===
Kim works at KCET as a television reporter for the weekly news series SoCal Connected and is the winner of 2 L.A. Emmys from the Television Academy, 3 Golden Mikes from the Radio & Television News Association, and the National Arts & Entertainment Journalism Award and a SoCal Journalism Award from the L.A. Press Club.

== Theatre ==
Kim originally moved to Los Angeles to become a playwright before becoming a documentary filmmaker. He joined the East West Players where he participated in the David Henry Hwang Writers Institute and worked as Resident Producer for Lodestone Theatre Ensemble from 2005-2010. Kim joined Company of Angels in 2012 when he participated in the annual L.A. Views series. His plays Trapezoid, Like Yesterday, RE:verse, and Rise Up have all been produced for the stage.

== Filmography ==
=== Journalism ===
Season 8

- “California Condors” (2017) - Reporter
- “Landfill Fight” (2017) - Reporter
- “Loving Joshua Tree to Death” (2017) - Reporter

Season 7

- “Simple Solution to Help the Homeless” (2017) - Reporter
- “‘Feathers of Fire’: A Spectacular Shadow Play" (2017) - Reporter
- “Hyperloop: Tube Travel at Near Supersonic Speed” (2017) - Reporter
- “A Great Use for UC Irvine’s Garbage” (2017) - Reporter
- “Urban Tree Canopy Benefits LA Communities, Some More Than Others” (2017) - Reporter
- “A Tiny House is a Work of Art” (2017) - Reporter

Season 6

- The Restoration and Revival of L.A.'s Hollyhock House (2015) - Reporter
- Bringing CicLAvia to South Los Angeles (2015) - Reporter
- Clare Graham's 'Warehouse of Wonders (2014) - Reporter
- Radio Personality Art Laboe (2014) - Reporter
- Grand Central Market: Past and Present (2014) - Reporter
- A Labyrinth of Books, Art, and Records (2014) - Reporter
- Art or Ad? L.A.'s Mural Law Written in Gray Ink (2014) - Reporter
- The Bottle Tree Ranch (2014) - Reporter
- The Future of Leimert Park (2014) - Reporter
- A Moveable Feast at the Brewery Art Colony (2014) - Reporter

=== Short Documentaries ===
- The Spirit of North Shore (2015) - Director, Producer
- Teatro Jornalero Sin Fronteras (2014) - Co-Director, Co-Producer
- My Moby Dick (2013) - Producer, Story Editor
- Songs in the Key of Los Angeles: The Bedrock Sessions (2013) - Producer, Story Editor
- Thank You For Coming (2013) - Producer, Story Editor
- Art Battle L.A. (2012) - Executive Producer, Producer, Writer

=== Feature films ===
- Art Battle L.A. (2012) - Executive Producer, Producer, Writer
- Qwerty (2011) - Associate Producer
- The Mikado Project (2010) - Associate Producer

=== Short films ===
- Vignette (2012) - Executive Producer, Director, Producer, Writer
- Sketch (2012) - Executive Producer, Producer, Writer
- Equal Opportunity (2007) - Associate Producer
- Pollen (2006) - Executive Producer, Producer, Writer

== Bibliography ==
=== Plays ===
- "a.l.a. (Asians in Los Angeles)"
- "Hyperbola"
- "Like Yesterday"
- "Point"
- "RE:verse"
- "Rise Up"
- "Taste of Home, A"
- "Trapezoid"
- "Tuba Player, The"
