= Luxe (company) =

- Type: Privately held company
- Founded: 2013
- Founders: Curtis Lee, Craig Martin
- Defunct: 2017
- Fate: Acquired
- Successor: Volvo Cars
- Headquarters: San Francisco (HQ)
- Number of locations: 6 cities
- Area served: United States
- Key people: Curtis Lee (CEO, founder)
- Products: Parking spaces, car services
- Services: On-demand parking and car services marketplace
- Website: www.luxe.com

5ecret 5tar Inc, doing business as Luxe, was a business that developed, marketed and operated the Luxe mobile app, an on-demand parking and car services mobile application. Using Luxe, customers could submit a request to have their car parked, fueled, washed, charged, serviced or driven home by the company's valets. Luxe was acquired by Volvo Cars in September 2017.

== Overview ==
Luxe was founded as Luxe Valet in 2013, by Curtis Lee and Craig Martin, former colleagues at Zynga. The app and service was launched the following October. Luxe is headquartered in San Francisco, California.

In the 12 months between the first two rounds of funding, the company grew to 6 business markets San Francisco, Seattle, New York City, Austin, Chicago and Los Angeles. The company works with parking lot operators. By April 2016, the company further expanded to other cities in the United States. The company also entered a relationship with Tesla Motors whereby Luxe would have exclusive access to dedicated Tesla charging stations for its customers.

The New York Times compared the service to Uber, Lyft and Amazon Prime for its ease of use and transformative impact on urban dwellers.

In April 2017, Luxe announced that it was ceasing valet operations in its remaining markets. The company was acquired by Volvo five months later.

== Funding ==
Luxe received its seed round funding of $5.5 million in October 2014, Series A funding of $20 million in February 2015 and a round of $50 million in April 2016 led by The Hertz Corporation.

== Media coverage ==
Luxe has been featured in Techcrunch, Bloomberg, Business Insider, Washington Post and others.
