= Luxe Radio =

Radio network in Morocco

- Country: Morocco
- Headquarters: 48, Bd. Rahal El Meskini, Casablanca

Programming
- Language(s): French

Ownership
- Owner: Abdessamad Aboulghali

History
- Launch date: 1 March 2009

Coverage
- Availability: On eight FM transmitters

Links
- Website: www.luxeradio.ma

Luxe Radio (Arabic: لوكس راديو) is a privately owned francophone Moroccan radio network. It focuses on fashion and lifestyle topics, and presents news and social, economic, and political debates. It plays exclusively cover versions of songs, particularly in lounge and electronic dance styles. Luxe Radio is based in Casablanca, Morocco, and broadcasts in Casablanca, Rabat, Jadida, Marrakesh, Essaouira, Agadir, Settat, and Asfi.

== History ==
In 2008, Abdessamad Aboulghali responded to an international call for projects put out by Morocco's High Commission for Audio-Visual Communication (الهيئة العليا للاتصال السمعي البصري), a regulatory commission established by King Muhammad VI. Among 4 stations selected, Luxe Radio got its license on February 23, 2009. On March 1, it began broadcasting with five programs: Les Matins Luxe with Seddik Khalfi, Diamant rose with Ikram El Ghinaoui, Avec ou sans parure with Youssef Ait Akdim, Superflu with Habib Hemch and Les Nuits magiques with Karim Allam Bouché. The station's general director was Ilham Alami.

- 7:30 am – 10:00 am: "Les Matins Luxe"
- Noon - 1:00 pm: "Heure Essentielle"
- 2:00 pm – 3:30 pm: "Avec ou sans Parure",
- Afternoon features :
  - 3:45 pm: Magazine Design
  - 4:00 pm: Magazine Les mots du luxe
  - 4:15 pm: Magazine Voyage
  - 4:30 pm: Magazine High-Tech
  - 4:45 pm: Magazine Bien être
  - 5:00 pm: Magazine Automobile
  - 5:15 pm: Magazine Architecture
  - 5:30 pm: Magazine Art Contemporain
  - 5:45 pm: Magazine Gastronomie

== Frequencies ==
FM frequencies by city:

- Casablanca : 99.2 MHz
- Rabat : 105.4 MHz
- Jadida : 98.0 MHz
- Marrakesh : 101.2 MHz
- Agadir : 102.4 MHz
- Essaouira : 102.0 MHz
- Settat : 102.4 MHz
- Asfi : 100.4 MHz
