= CYJO =

South-Korean-born American photographer

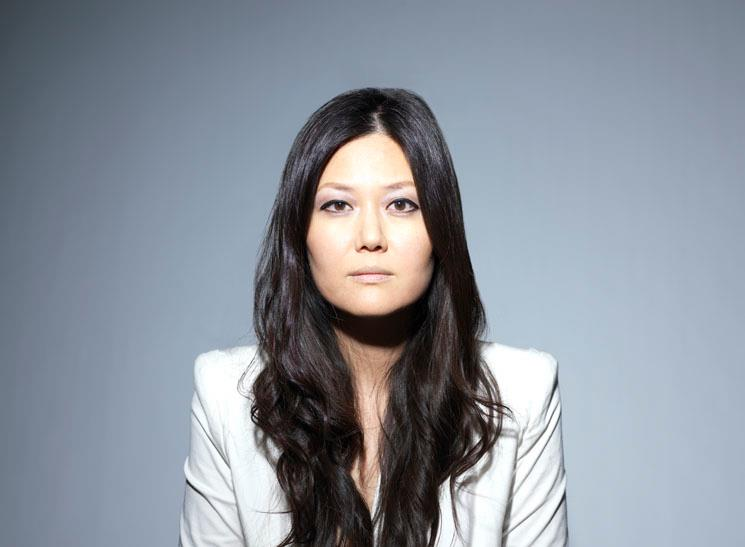
- Born: Cindy Hwang; June 13, 1974 (age 52); Seoul, KR
- Known for: Photography Contemporary Art
- Notable work: KYOPO Project, Substructure

CYJO /ˈsiːˈdʒoʊ/, born Cindy Hwang (1974), is an American Fine-art photographer. She is known for her photographic and textual projects, such as Substructure and KYOPO Project.

== Life and career ==
CYJO was born in Seoul, Korea, and immigrated to the US in 1975. She attended University of Maryland, College Park, Instituto Politecnico Internazionale Della Moda, in Italy, and graduated magna cum laude at Fashion Institute of Technology, in New York City.

CYJO is the creator of the KYOPO Project, its name a reference to the Korean diaspora. Her biography states, "KYOPO Project is a photographic and textual project about immigration and identity through the lens of the Korean ancestry. Over 200 people, mostly living in America, explore their relationships with their ancestral culture and the other cultures they embody through citizenship or through life experiences."

Her work has been exhibited in the US and abroad, and has been shown in museums such as the National Portrait Gallery at the Smithsonian Institution, as part of their first major showcase of contemporary Asian American portraiture. About KYOPO Project, The Washington Post wrote, "the pictures have the slickness of a fashion shoot, but the texts reveal hidden depth and complexity". Smithsonian Magazine wrote, "CYJO’s images are wonderfully unencumbered: she uses her lens to convey straight-forward stories of the constructed “self”—here we are, the images tell us, in our stance as contemporary Korean Americans. Change may constantly skim the surface of modern life, but KYOPO reveals something lasting beneath". CYJO's Substructure is a collection of photos documenting the hands of 50 Chinese migrant workers. In the summer of 2010, CYJO traveled to three different migrant centers with the goal of providing "an educational platform" to increase awareness of the difficulties experienced by the migrants. CYJO focused on the hands as both an expressive tool and anonymous means of sharing these migrant voices.

== Major works ==
=== The KYOPO Project (2004–2010) ===
The KYOPO Project is a photographic and textual project that explores identity and immigration through the lens of Korean ancestry. The KYOPO Project dissects over 230 kyopo (people of Korean ethnicity living outside the Korean peninsula). KYOPO is a forced collective of individuals that challenges the idea of a monolithic Korean and investigates what it means to be a Korean and American. Relationships with ancestry, their culture of citizenship and other cultures they embody are expressed explaining a constantly evolving identity. Issues discussed in the KYOPO Project include adoption, generational issues, Asians in politics & arts, “mixed” kyopo and the global identity. KYOPO, the publication, published by Umbrage Editions, features 237 photos and interviews with a foreword by writer and lecturer of ethnic studies Marie Myung Ok Lee and introduction by art critic and academic Julian Stallabrass.

=== Substructure (2010) ===
Substructure is a photographic, textual and video project on the global topic of migration profiling 50 migrants residing in Beijing. Aged 5–80, these individuals from varying provinces including Henan, Shandong and Anhui talk about their journeys for a better life and a developing China. Their portraits are photographed and videotaped anonymously through their hands where the detailed print of the photo contrasts the raw kinesthetic gestures in video. Substructure was created in collaboration with an NGO, Compassion for Migrant Children (CMC).

== Other works ==
- Moment, Moving Moments (2012): Moment, Moving Moments, explores the characterization of Dashilar through still and moving images. Both individual and façade are extricated to show the historic and evolving identity of a hutong (ancient city alley or lane formed by traditional courtyard residences) that have over 600 years of history.
- Digital Fallout (2012): Digital Fallout is a series of 96 digital configurations that have accidentally surfaced on the computer monitor while online in China. Random, color combinations and compositions are captured to create varied portraits of the Internet structure currently present. This series is a product of its regulatory firewall context that often results with varied and sporadic Internet speeds creating temporary bouts of digital fallout. This work is a continuing series.
- Mixed Blood (2010): Mixed Blood features 9 families that reside in NY, all of which have children that are mixed ethnicities. These NY families talk about being American/a New Yorker and share their experiences/relationships with the various cultures they embody.
- Sunrise (2010): Sunrise is a portrait series of Mao and his rise into becoming the first leader of a unified China. The iconic Mao portrait currently hung at Tiannamen Square in Beijing, China is referenced where the background, a sunrise that symbolizes a New China becomes the point of focus. Color densities of this sunrise depict his rise and wane of power. Eighty-two sunrises are depicted, each representing a year of his life.
- Blue Sky Day (2010): Blue Sky Day documents the color palette of Beijing’s sky for a period of 30 days in correlation with air quality readings which are gathered from the Ministry of Environmental Protection of the People’s Republic of China.
- Beauty 01 (2010): Beauty 01 is a quadriptych of a Western and Asian woman which investigates cultural aspects of beauty by exhibiting both their original and manipulated portraits.
- Quarantined (2009): Quarantined is a photo documentary of some of the safety measures China took to prevent the spread of H2N1 in 2009. It documents a quarantined individual where two perspectives were captured, the quarantined subject through the computer lens via Skype and the subject’s experiences sent via his iPhone. All images are showcased in the same scale as the actual image displayed on the computer screen and iPhone.

== Exhibitions ==
- Asia Society Texas Center, Houston, Texas, KYOPO in "Portraiture Now, Asian American Portraits of Encounter" (2012 -2013)
- JANM (Japanese American National Museum), Los Angeles, California, KYOPO in "Portraiture Now, Asian American Portraits of Encounter" (2013)
- The Smithsonian National Portrait Gallery, Washington D.C., “Asian in America, Portraits of Encounter” (2011–2012)
- Atrium Gallery, London, “Substructure” (2011)
- T. Art Center, Beijing, “Substructure” (2010)
- Korea Society, New York City, “The KYOPO Project” (2008)
