= Charlotte Cho =

Korean American entrepreneur, esthetician, and author

- Cho in 2026
- Born: July 29, 1985 (age 41); California
- Occupations: Businesswoman, entrepreneur, Esthetician, author, CEO
- Known for: Soko Glam

Charlotte Cho is a South Korean American esthetician, author and entrepreneur. She is best known as the cofounder of Soko Glam, a company that specializes in Korean beauty products. She is considered a major contributor to the current K-Beauty emergence in the U.S.

== Career ==
Charlotte Cho was born in California. In 2008 she travelled to South Korea to assist Samsung in their marketing and communications department During this time she met and married US Army Captain David K. Cho, and they both began curating Korean skincare and makeup products to the US market. In 2012 they founded Soko Glam. The company is currently considered one of the most prominent firms specializing in K-Beauty products and treatments in the US Charlotte Cho regularly publishes her experiences and research about Korean beauty products, practices, and trends via various News Media and Soko Glam's website. In 2015, she authored a book on Skin Care titled "The Little Book of Skin Care: Korean Beauty Secrets for Healthy, Glowing Skin" (2015). In 2018, she launched Then I Met You, a premium skin care line rooted in the concept of Jeong and meaningful experiences.

== Books ==
- "The Little Book of Skin Care: Korean Beauty Secrets for Healthy, Glowing Skin". William Morrow; First edition (November 10, 2015). ISBN 978-0062416384
- "The Little Book of Jeong: The Korean Art of Building Deep Connections – and How It Changed My Life". CJCDKC LLC; First Edition (July 15, 2021) ISBN 978-1735566795
