= Gallery Row, Los Angeles =

Gallery Row
- Neighborhood in Los Angeles
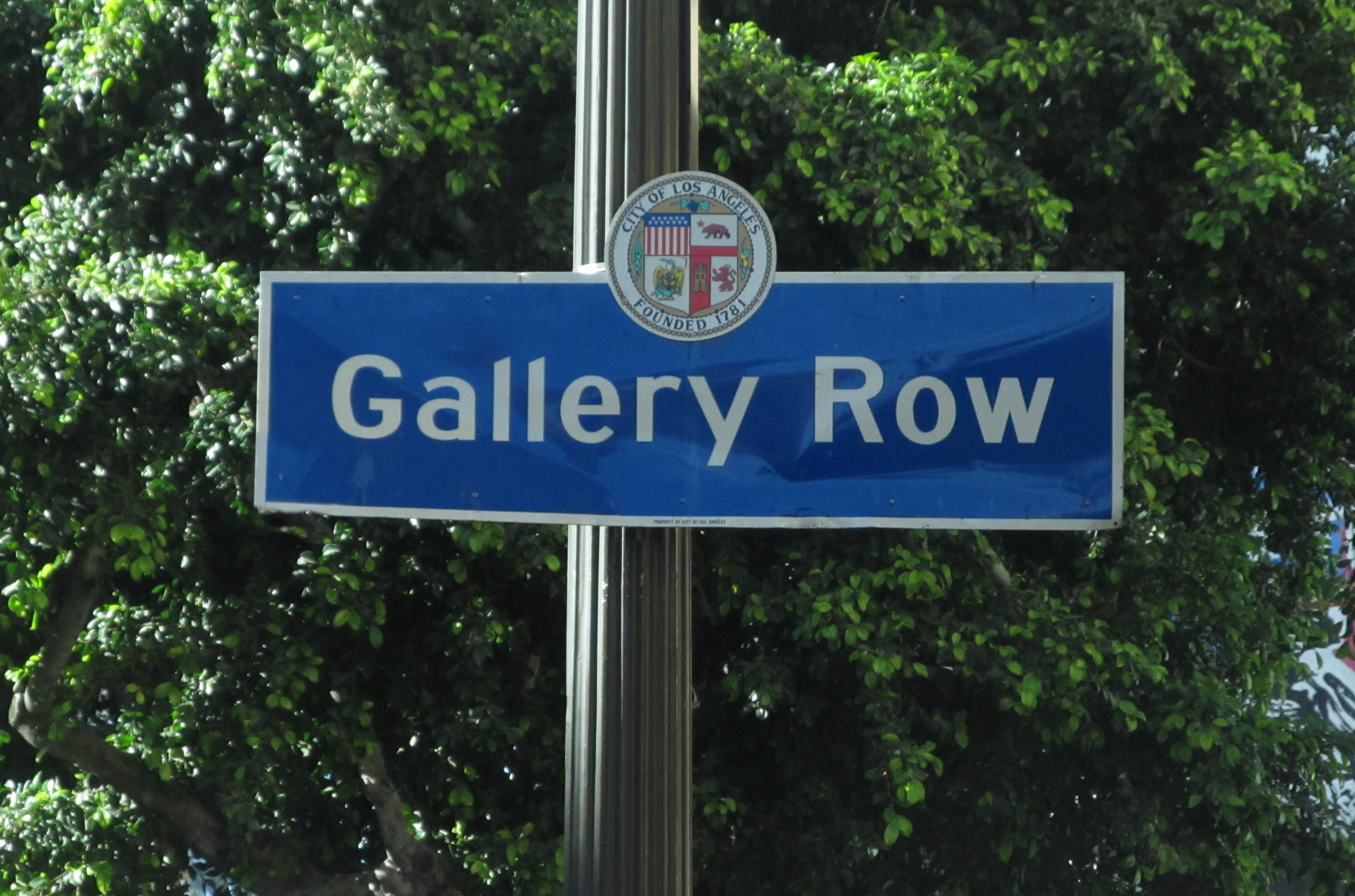
- Neighborhood sign at the intersection of Spring and Fifth Street

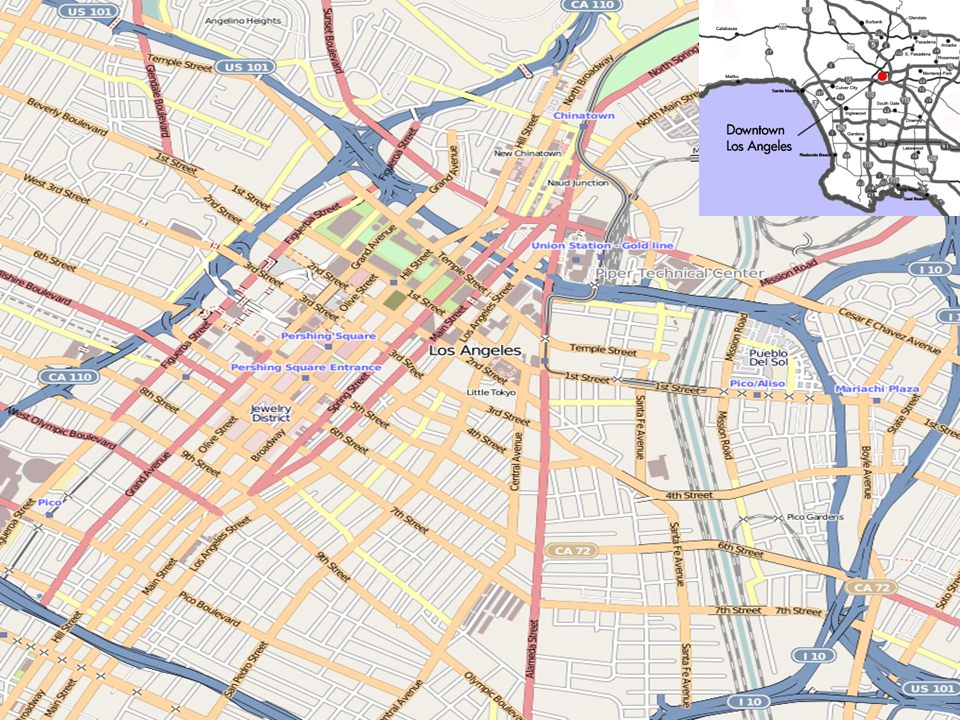
- Location within Downtown Los Angeles
- Coordinates: 34.048161°N 118.247371°W
- Country: United States
- State: California
- County: Los Angeles County
- City: Los Angeles
- Area code: 213

Gallery Row is a neighborhood in downtown Los Angeles, designated by the city council in 2003 to promote the concentration of art galleries along Main and Spring Streets.

== Location ==
It runs north–south along Main and Spring Streets from 2nd Street in the north to 9th Street in the south.

== History ==
Gallery Row is based on a proposal by artists Nic Cha Kim and Kjell Hagen, members of the Arts, Aesthetics, and Culture (AAC) Committee of the Downtown Los Angeles Neighborhood Council (DLANC). There were only three galleries in the area: Inshallah Gallery on Main Street near 3rd, bank (Lorraine Molina) on Main Street near 4th, and 727 Gallery on Spring Street near 7th (Adrian Rivas, James Rojas). The borders of the proposed district were driven by inclusion of the existing art venues and the potential for expansion in the largely-vacant district.

In 2003, much of the Historic Core shared attributes with Skid Row; the area was marginally active with shoppers and other visitors by day, but by evening most establishments closed and people went elsewhere. A city council motion co-sponsored by Jan Perry and Antonio Villaraigosa to designate Gallery Row was passed in July 2003, and Gallery Row street signs were installed in the fall.The AAC Committee met weekly at Inshallah Gallery to plan an opening ceremony, which was scheduled for May 15, 2004. At Biddy Mason Park on Spring Street, the ceremony was hosted by Los Angeles city officials. Temporary galleries were set up in empty storefronts, a series of theatre readings was presented at the Los Angeles Theatre Center, and information booths supported the local community. By September 2004, eight galleries were operating.

== Downtown Art Walk ==
The Downtown Art Walk, on the second Thursday of each month, is a self-guided tour of the downtown art venues. They include commercial art galleries, public museums, and non-profit arts venues. The walk was begun by gallery owner Bert Green a month before the opening of his gallery at 5th and Main. The AAC committee was spun off as the nonprofit Gallery Row Organization, which promotes and develops the district's cultural resources.

The number of participating galleries reached 30 in 2007, and about 40 in 2010. DLANC sponsored the Art Walk shuttle in 2007, which began service in June of that year. The number of visitors grew from about 75 in September 2004 to more than 15,000 in 2010.

== See also ==
- Gentrification
- Urban renaissance
- Urban renewal
