= Ji-Yeon Yuh =

American sociologist

Ji-Yeon Yuh is an American reporter, writer, editor and professor in Asian American history and Asian diasporas at Northwestern University. Since 2005, Yuh is the director of Program in Asian American Studies at Northwestern University.

Yuh is a co-founder and National Spokesperson of the Alliance of Scholars Concerned about Korea organization.

== Biography ==
Yuh studied at Erasmus Society of the Latin School of Chicago in 1983. She received her B.S. in Cognitive Science at Stanford University in 1987; and her Ph.D. from the Department of History at University of Pennsylvania in 1999.

After she graduated from Stanford University, Yuh worked as a reporter at the Omaha World-Herald, Omaha, NE from September 1987 to May 1989. Afterward, she had several engagements as a reporter with Newsday, New York, NY: from June to September 1987, May 1989 to July 1990. In 1991 from June to September, she was an editorial board member and writer at The Philadelphia Inquirer, Philadelphia, PA.

In May 1990, after Yuh criticized an article by fellow Newsday columnist Jimmy Breslin as sexist, Breslin heatedly retorted with racial and sexual invective. Asian American and anti-hate groups forcefully decried Breslin's outburst. Breslin appeared on The Howard Stern Show to banter about his outburst and Koreans in general. Following this controversial radio broadcast, Newsday managing editor Anthony Marro suspended Breslin for two weeks, after which Breslin apologized.

Upon Yuh's graduation from the University of Pennsylvania, she started her teaching and research career in Asian American Studies at Northwestern University and serves as a director at the Asian American Studies Program.

She is the author of the book Beyond the Shadow of Camptown: Korean Military Brides in America, which chronicled the history of Korean women who immigrated to the United States as the wives of U.S. soldiers and examines the dynamics of race, culture, gender, and nationalism from the perspective of Korean military brides.

== Selected publications ==
=== Books ===
- Beyond the Shadow of Camptown: Korean Military Brides in America, New York University Press, 2002

=== Selected articles ===
- “Moved By War: Migration, Diaspora, and the Korean War.” Journal of Asian American Studies, Vol. 8, No. 3, Oct. 2005. pp. 277–292.
- “Imagined Community: Sisterhood and Resistance Among Korean Military Brides,” in Asian Pacific Islander American Women: A Historical Anthology, edited by Shirley Hune and Gail Nomura, New York University Press, 2003, pp. 221–236.

== Awards ==
- Peabody Award for the radio documentary, “Crossing East,” (consulting scholar), 2006
- Milestone Maker Award, Asian American Institute, 2004
