= Fremont University =

College in California

Coordinates: 33.868258°N 118.096954°W

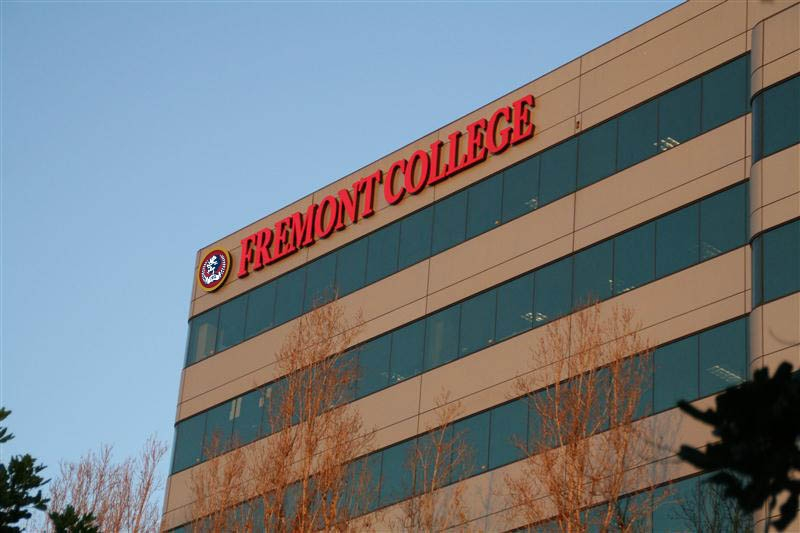
- Type: Private for-profit college
- Established: 1986; 39 years ago
- Location: Cerritos, California, United States
- Campus: Campus in Cerritos, California, and online

Fremont University, formerly Fremont College, is a private for-profit college in Cerritos, California. It offers vocational degree programs with a focus on serving working adults.

== History ==
The college has its origins in the founding of Platt College in 1879 in St. Joseph, Missouri, as one of the first business schools west of the Mississippi. A branch campus was established in southern California in 1986. The name was changed to Fremont College in 2007. Fremont College was acquired by Select Education Group (SEG) in 2019 and subsequently changed its name to Fremont University.

== Academics ==
Fremont University offers programs in business, paralegal studies, healthcare, wellness and administration of justice. Online and on-campus programs are available.

The college is accredited by the Accrediting Commission of Career Schools and Colleges. The institution is also approved to operate by the California Bureau for Private Postsecondary Education. Fremont University's paralegal studies program is approved by the American Bar Association. The sports and rehabilitation therapy and the massage therapy programs are approved by the California Massage Therapy Council.
