= Yu Yeon Kim (curator) =

South Korean curator

- Born: 1956 (age 69–70); South Korea
- Occupation: Curator

Korean name
- Hangul: 김유연
- RR: Gim Yuyeon
- MR: Kim Yuyŏn

Yu Yeon Kim (born 1956) is an independent curator based in New York City, United States and Seoul, South Korea. Kim has curated and been a commissioner of many distinguished international exhibitions of contemporary art.

== Works ==
In 2008, Kim curated "Corporeal/Technoreal", a Media Art project for the Poland Mediations Biennale. (Note: Website) In the same year she curated the first exhibition of Korean contemporary art in Cuba. The project, "Los Puntos del Compas" (The Points of the Compass) was exhibited at the Fundacion Ludwig de Cuba and other satellite sites in Havana. The exhibition was also hosted by the Sala de Arte Publico Siqueiros, Mexico City.

In 2007, she curated "Counterpoint", an international exhibition of art that is part of a series exploring cultural, political and territorial divisions – using the schism of Korea as a relative point. The exhibition was held at Bund 18 in Shanghai, and the Coreana Museum of Art in Seoul as well as venues in Poznań, Poland. This subject was also manifested in other exhibitions of international artists Kim has curated, including "Pyongyang Report" at the Book House, Has II and Jung Han Sook Memorial Hall in Heyri Art Valley, S. Korea

Kim was an International Researcher of the Liverpool Biennial 2004 in the United Kingdom. She was also the commissioner and curator for Latin America for the 3rd Gwangju Biennale 2000 (Exotica Incognita) in South Korea and a principal curator of the 2nd Johannesburg Biennale, (Note: Website) South Africa, 1997–1998, (for which she curated Transversions at the Museum Africa).

In 2001, she produced and curated the controversial exhibition, Translated Acts - Performance and Body Art from East Asia, which was initially presented at the Haus der Kulturen der Welt, Berlin (2001) and then traveled to the Queens Museum of Art, New York (2001–2002) and the Museo de Arte Carrillo Gil in Mexico City (2002–2003).

Kim's curatorial projects also include:

- 2016 "New Conjunctions" at the United National Headquarter, New York.
- 2014 "Fluid Form II" (Arab Contemporary Art) at the Busan Museum of Art and Blue Square Samsung, Seoul.
- 2013 "Gauguin and After 'Idyllic Synthesis'; Contradiction of Vision and Reality" at Seoul Museum of Art, Seoul.
- 2012 "Hanji Metamorphoses"; An International exhibition of Art & Design & Fashion utilizing Hanji (Korean handmade paper) projects at the Rubin Museum of Art, UN Korean Embassy & Chelsea venues in New York.
- 2011 "Tong; Link", Contemporary Art and Buddhism at Sungbo Museum and Haeinsa Temples in Korea celebrating 1,000 years of the Tripitaka Koreana.
- 2010 - 2009 "Magnetic Power"; Contemporary Art from South East Asia (Brunei, Cambodia, Indonesia, Malaysia, Laos, Myanmar, Philippines, Singapore, Vietnam), Coreana Museum of Art & Samcheong-dong Art Spaces, Seoul and “Fluid Form I ”, Contemporary Art and Urban Design from Arab Countries at Korea Culture Foundation and Museum of Modern Art, Ansan, Korea.
- 2008 "Corporeal/Technoreal", a Media Art project, Printing Factory, Poznań.
- 2008 "Los Puntos del Compas" at the Fundacion Ludwig de Cuba and other satellite sites in Havana. The exhibition was also hosted by the Sala de Arte Publico Siqueiros Museum, Mexico City.
- 2007 "Counterpoint", (an international exhibition of art that is part of a series exploring cultural, political and territorial divisions) at Bund 18 in Shanghai, China and the Coreana Museum of Art in Seoul as well as venues in Poznań, Poland.
- 2006 "Pyongyang Report" at Paju Book City, Publication Culture Center, Heyri Art Village and Press Center, Seoul, S. Korea.
- 2005 "DMZ-2005" at Paju Book City, Publication Culture Center, Heyri Art Village and Press Center, Seoul, S. Korea.
- 2003 - 2001, "Translated Acts" - Performance and Body Art from China, Korea, Japan, Taiwan and their Diasporas, a controversial exhibition initially presented at the Haus der Kulturen der Welt, Berlin (2001) and then traveled to the Queens Museum of Art, New York (2001–2002) and the Museo de Carrillo Gil in Mexico City (2002–2003).
- 1998 "Fragmented Histories", (Asia-Pacific section) for Cinco Continentes y Una Ciudad (Five Continents and One City) exposition at the Mexico City Museum in Mexico (1998).
- 1998 - 1997 In the Eye of the Tiger, a survey of Korean contemporary art at Exit Art/The Third World, New York, and the Ilmin Museum of Art, Seoul, Korea.
- 1996 OMNIZONE, Perspectives in Mapping Digital Culture, an on-line project featured on both the Plexus.org and the Guggenheim Museum website.
- 1994 Flesh and Ciphers, Here Art Foundation New York City.
