= Mochi (magazine) =

American magazine

- Editor: Giannina Ong (2021-present)
- Former editors: Jennifer Duann Fultz (2019-2021), Stephanie Wu (2008-2018)
- Categories: Lifestyle, Fashion, Entertainment, Beauty, Career, College, Relationships, Politics
- First issue: Fall 2008
- Country: United States
- Based in: New York City
- Language: English
- Website: www.mochimag.com

Mochi Magazine (also known as Mochi or Mochi Mag) is an online magazine that serves as a destination for Asian American women to share their stories, experiences, and passions. Mochi's mission is to amplify Asian voices and support the growth and inclusion of Asian American women.

Mochi was founded by Maggie Hsu, Stephanie Wu, and Sandra Sohn in 2008. The magazine's conceived goal was to "provide a community for Asian American teenage girls to access sisterly advice and gain self-esteem", with articles written from a range of perspectives, including high school students, college women, young professionals, and other role models. The magazine was originally intended to be a print publication, but transitioned online to appeal to a younger audience, overcome printing costs and reach a wider geographic range of readers. It is entirely run by an all-volunteer staff.

Current members of the executive board include Giannina Ong, Sarah Jinee Park, Melody Ip, and Adelina Sun.

== Features ==
Mochi has served as a catalyst for conversation on the Asian American identity in the film, music, politics, fashion and everyday life. The first issue had actress Brenda Song as a cover girl, which was arranged through the founders' connection to the entertainment industry. Since then, Mochi has interviewed multiple prominent role models in the Asian American community, including YouTube beauty vlogger Michelle Phan, Yahoo! co-founder Jerry Yang, The Bling Ring actress Katie Chang, comedian Margaret Cho, professional golfer Michelle Wie, Bay Area politician Evan Low, Big Hero 6 actor Daniel Henney, Mandopop singer Wang Leehom, and K-pop group f(x)'s Amber Liu, among others.

In 2010, Mochi released the first and only comprehensive college guide for Asian American teens. A year later, Mochi compiled a list of twenty-five influential Asian American youth in an article called "The Ultimate 25 under 25", published in the Spring 2011 issue. Although entertainment and beauty articles have attracted the majority of site hits, Mochi has also published a diverse collection of articles pertaining to health, mental well-being, relationships, food, travel and culture.

Over the years, Mochi writers have addressed hard-hitting issues in the Asian American community, such as the Asian American body image, the model minority myth, the "bamboo ceiling", and stigma surrounding LGBT identity and interracial dating. Since 2011, Mochi has published a series of articles on safe sex and protection against STDs. With the rise of the digital age, there has been an increasing focus on articles guiding young women interested in pursuing technology careers.

== Events and Partnerships ==
=== Live Networking ===
In October 2011, Mochi hosted its first live networking event called "Faces of Mochi" in New York's Folli Follie store, celebrating the launch of its Fall 2011 issue, thus gathering young Asian Americans all across the country for a night full of fashion and fun. In September 2012, Mochi hosted its first open model call at the Work Gallery in Ann Arbor, Michigan. In the following years, Mochi continued to hold special events, including wine socials, shopping experiences at BaubleBar (March 2013) and Club Clio (May 2015), chocolate tastings with ROYCE' Chocolate (June 2013) and movies screenings (November 2013).

=== Panels and Workshops ===
Mochi has a growing presence at journalism workshops and Asian American community events. Executive board members and staff members have presented at the Midwest Asian American Students Union (MAASU), the East Coast Asian American Student Union (ECAASU), and the Intercollegiate Taiwanese American Students Association (ITASA). In November 2013, co-founder Maggie Hsu visited several East Coast collegiate organizations including the Chinese Students' Association, Sangam and Taiwanese Society at UPenn and Kappa Phi Lambda sorority at University of Connecticut.

=== Collaborations ===
Mochi has partnered with various Asian American interest groups such as the Banyan Tree Project, Audrey, NYU-based Asian American publication Generasian, Kollaboration, ITASA, Harvard University's Identities Fashion Show, Amp Music Festival, Lunar New Year Festival by Xi'an Famous Foods, and others, through co-hosted events and sponsored posts.

== Recognition ==
Mochi earned recognition as an up-and-coming business venture at the Harvard Asian American Alumni Summit in 2010, reaching the semi-finalist stage of the Elevate Pitch Competition. Semi-finalists were chosen by a panel of judges "based on the creativity, integrity and originality of their ideas, as well as worthiness of funding."

"Diagnosing the Asian American Eating Disorder," an article written for the Winter 2010 issue, was later republished in the 2012 edition of Eating Disorders (Opposing Viewpoints), a Cengage textbook. Other articles by Mochi have been cited by major media outlets in the past, including New York Magazine, Complex, XoJane, and VICE.

== Past issues ==
Mochi released 33 issues since 2008.

Issue Title	Date	Cover	Notable Features
Premiere	Fall 2008	Brenda Song	Romi Dames, Justin Nozuka, James Kyson
Technology	Midyear 2009	Yin Chang	Jerry Yang, Tao Lin
Green	Fall 2009	Susanna Lau	Tim Be Told, Afterschoolspecial
College	Spring 2010	Harry Shum Jr.	Nikki SooHoo
Travel	Summer 2010	Michelle Wie	Lindy Tsang, Justin Chon
Influence	Fall 2010		Margaret Cho, Evan Low, Lela Lee, Zee Avi, Eva Chen, Jon Chu, Janet Hsieh, Chang-Rae Lee, Shaun Evaristo, Hannah Song
Body	Winter 2010	Marié Digby	Karla Garcia, Anna Maria Perez de Tagle
Youth	Spring 2011	Kelsey Chow	Eddie Huang
Oops	Summer 2011	Priscilla Ahn	Lisa See, Lynn Chen
Pioneer	Fall 2011	John Cho, Kal Penn	Phil Yu, Joseph Vincent
Relationship	Winter 2011	Far East Movement	Jay Chou, Toni Ko
Underdog	Spring 2012	Jeremy Lin	Clara Chung, Aziatix, Jubilee Project
Reinvention	Summer 2012	Jamie Chung	David Choi, Jane Lui, Jason Jean
Style	Fall 2012	Marissa Webb	Daniel Henney, Steve Byrne
Romance	Winter 2012	Katie Chang	Munemi Imai, Victoria Tsai
Self-Made	Spring 2013	Ellen Wong	Khalil Fong, D-Pryde, Jessica Yu, Claudia Chan, Maia Shibutani and Alex Shibutani
Fearless	Summer 2013	Dara Shen	Christine Ha
Dreamer	Fall 2013	Michelle Phan	Evan Jackson Leong, Rie Tsuji, Nicki Sun
Spirit	Winter 2013	Nicole Gale Anderson	Tao Okamoto, Anna Akana, Hollis, Kevin Kwan
Outspoken	Spring 2014	Katrina Law	Arden Cho, Yen-j, Cassey Ho, Maya Erskine, Cole Horibe
Adventure	Summer 2014	Jessika Van	AGNEZ MO, Peter Adrian
Ambition	Fall 2014	Kimiko Glenn	Ki Hong Lee, Reshma Shetty, Linda Cho
Celebration	Winter 2015	Kina Grannis	Diana Bang, Awkwafina
Power	Spring 2015	25 Influentials	Leehom Wang, Amber Liu
Men	Summer 2015	Eugene Lee Yang	Wong Fu Productions, Ross Butler
Future	Winter 2016	Samantha Futerman and Anaïs Bordier	Daniel Wu, Sophia Chua-Rubenfeld, Michelle Tan
Selfish	Summer 2016	Krista Marie Yu	George Young, Kristen Li, Run River North
Unity	Fall 2016	Vanessa Lee	Rachael Yamagata, Karen Fukuhara, Yul Kwon, Miki Agrawal
Resilience	Spring 2017	Hayden Szeto	Manny Jacinto, Eva Noblezada, Tammy Duckworth, Kamala Harris, Mazie Hirono
Visibility	Fall 2017	Sonya Balmores	Filharmonic, Melissa Polinar, Kevin Yee, Jae Jin, Shei Phan
Anniversary	Summer 2018	Liza Koshy, Nadya Okamoto, Schuyler Bailar, Auli’i Cravalho	Lana Condor, Hailee Steinfeld, Elizabeth Ho, Jessica Nguyen, Broti Gupta
Family	Summer 2021	N/A	Parents Are Human, Elizabeth Miki Brina, Quincy Surasmith, Mai Nguyen
Very Superstitious	Fall 2021	N/A	Peter Chan, Suttirat Anne Lalarb, Ashly Burch, Kat Chow, Jenny Qi
Cultural Capital	Winter 2022		Eva Chen, Sophie Diao
Everyday Asian American	Summer 2022		Darrell Fuentes
Politics	Fall 2022		
Holiday	Holiday 2022		
Environment	Winter 2023		Jenny Nguyen
Art	Summer 2023		Jo Bulaong
Friendship	Winter 2024		
