= Angry Little Girls =

Webcomic by Korean American Lela Lee

- Cover of the first print collection of Angry Little Girls
- Author: Lela Lee

Angry Little Girls is a webcomic by Lela Lee. The comic was launched by 2000 and is based on Lee's animated series, Angry Little Asian Girl. It challenges gender and racial stereotypes. The main character is six-year-old Kim, an angry Korean American girl.

== History ==
=== Creation ===
The comic is written by Lela Lee, a Korean American. Lee, the youngest of four girls, is also an actor who was a main character on the TV series Tremors and appeared in shows such as Friends, Scrubs, and Charmed. As of 2015 she was living in Los Angeles.

When Lee was a student at the University of California, Berkeley in 1994, she visited Spike and Mike's Sick and Twisted Festival of Animation. She walked out angered by a series of ethnic jabs and drew her own animations that night, using Crayola markers and then video-editing equipment at school to complete her first episode. These became the animated series Angry Little Asian Girl. However, a Los Angeles Times article gives a different origin story: that general stress from family and study pressure led to her using drawing as an escape, then later a friend encouraged her to compile the drawings into a short video.

She initially did not show her animation to anyone, but four years later she showed it to some friends who liked it. In 1998, she debuted her animation and started selling merchandise, and launched the comic in 2000, though some sources say the comic strip was started in 1998 or in "the late 90s". The comic was entitled Angry Little Girls and included more diverse characters to broaden its appeal after a TV executive told her there was no market for Asian characters.

The main character of Kim is based on Lee; PBS said it is "clear that Lee is Kim's real-life alter ego." Lee said that "You didn't get angry in our house. If you got angry, you were a bad child. The cartoon is my therapy."

Lee has produced a broad range of merchandise from the comic, including iPhone cases, dolls, skateboards and aprons.

=== Trademark dispute ===
In 2015, a trademark dispute came to light; Lee had charged that Phil Yu, writer of the Angry Asian Man blog, had appropriated Lee's material, including the phrase "stay angry" and featuring an "angry reader of the week". Yu had attempted to trademark the brand "Angry Asian Man" in 2014, but was rejected by the US Patent and Trademark Office for being too similar to Lee's trademark from 1999. After the rejection, Yu wrote to Lee saying he planned to appeal, which sparked the feud.

Yu posted emails between the two, in which Lee said "You have been skating, riding off my work. You took my ideas and pretend like they are yours. STOP IT". Lee also said to Yu that her parents hated her for being a girl and she accused him of being a “Korean boy prince who was probably doted on.” She later regretted the personal attacks but did say that her life would have been different if she were male. The battle led commentators to worry that it would tarnish reputations of the two as leading voices of the Asian-American community. Jenn Fang of Reappropriate said, “What saddens me is that two titans of Asian America have come to blows over who has exclusive rights to call themselves an ‘Angry Asian". Both Yu and Lee later took down their blog posts on the dispute as a sign of goodwill.

=== Updates and popularity ===
As of 2003, the comic was being updated weekly and the site was receiving around 750,000 to 800,000 hits a month. Gendy Alimurung of the LA Weekly said in 2005 that the comic had "slowly but steadily been amassing a following." The first printed collection was published in 2005. According to the Washington Post in 2015, "[Lee's] influence has waned in the social-media era as the ease of publication and distribution have created more competition." As of 2020, the strip is still updating weekly on GoComics.

== Comic overview ==
The main character of is Kim, a six-year-old Korean-American who freely speaks her mind to challenge daily indignities of race and gender stereotypes. Gendy Alimurung of LA Weekly described Kim as a character who is "angry about boys... racism, sexism, fitting in, not fitting in, love, her hair, her depressed friend, perfect people, stupid people, blacks, whites, Latinos, Asians, the weather, religion, apologies, her dolls and her mother." Other characters include Disenchanted Debra, Gloomy Xyla, Soul Sistah Wanda and Crazy Maria.

== Film and television adaptations ==
Gamechanger Films has partnered with Angry Little Girls, and plans to adapt the comic strip into television series and films.

== Reception ==
In a 2003 review, Seattle Times reporter Young Chang said "Lee's 'Angry Little Girls' throws a whole lot of rage at the notion that girls should always be good, accommodating and not too outspoken — especially in the face of racism and chauvinism... Kim and her crew of severely peeved little friends simmer with the kind of foul-mouthed comebacks I'd only dream of once it's too late."

Elaine Kim, Professor of Asian American Studies at UC Berkeley, said of Lee's work: "The way that Lela expresses herself in her cartoons wouldn't really have been possible in the past. I can't even imagine having a comic strip like 'Angry Little Girls' when I was young. If there had been something like that, it would've made me feel much more powerful because I would've felt that someone else experienced what I felt only I had to go through. It would've been really helpful."
