= The Midnight Shift =

2021 novel by Cheon Seon-Ran

The Midnight Shift is a 2021 novel by South Korean author Cheon Seon-Ran.

== Publication history ==
The novel was originally published in Korean in 2021. An English translation, translated by Gene Png, was released in August 2025.

== Themes ==
In an interview with Mochi, Cheon stated that "above all, I focused on the aspect of vampires as ‘long-lived beings.’ To live a long life, I believe, is to find that all sorrows eventually become the same," adding that the novel was inspired by a trip she took to Mont-Saint-Michel in France, where "I stared out into the dim landscape and felt certain that somewhere out there was a vampire — a solitary being who had lived for an impossibly long time. I wrote in my diary: ‘France, vampire. Must write.’"

== Critical reception ==
Publishers Weekly gave the novel a positive review, saying that "though the worldbuilding occasionally feels inconsistent, Cheon’s nuanced exploration of loneliness and isolation resonates. K-drama fans, especially those drawn to moody supernatural thrillers and complex, character-driven plots, will eagerly devour this genre-blurring tale." Ian Mond of Locus wrote that the novel "never feels like a vampire novel, but rather a nuanced, compassionate meditation on loneliness, family, loyalty, and love."
