= Trace Repeat =

Band

- Origin: Oakland, California
- Genres: Funk, soul
- Years active: 2015–present
- Labels: Independent
- Members: Wesley Woo; Khrizia Kamille; Josh Sherman; Daniel Wilson; Ben Peterson; Rei Otsuka
- Website: http://tracerepeat.com/

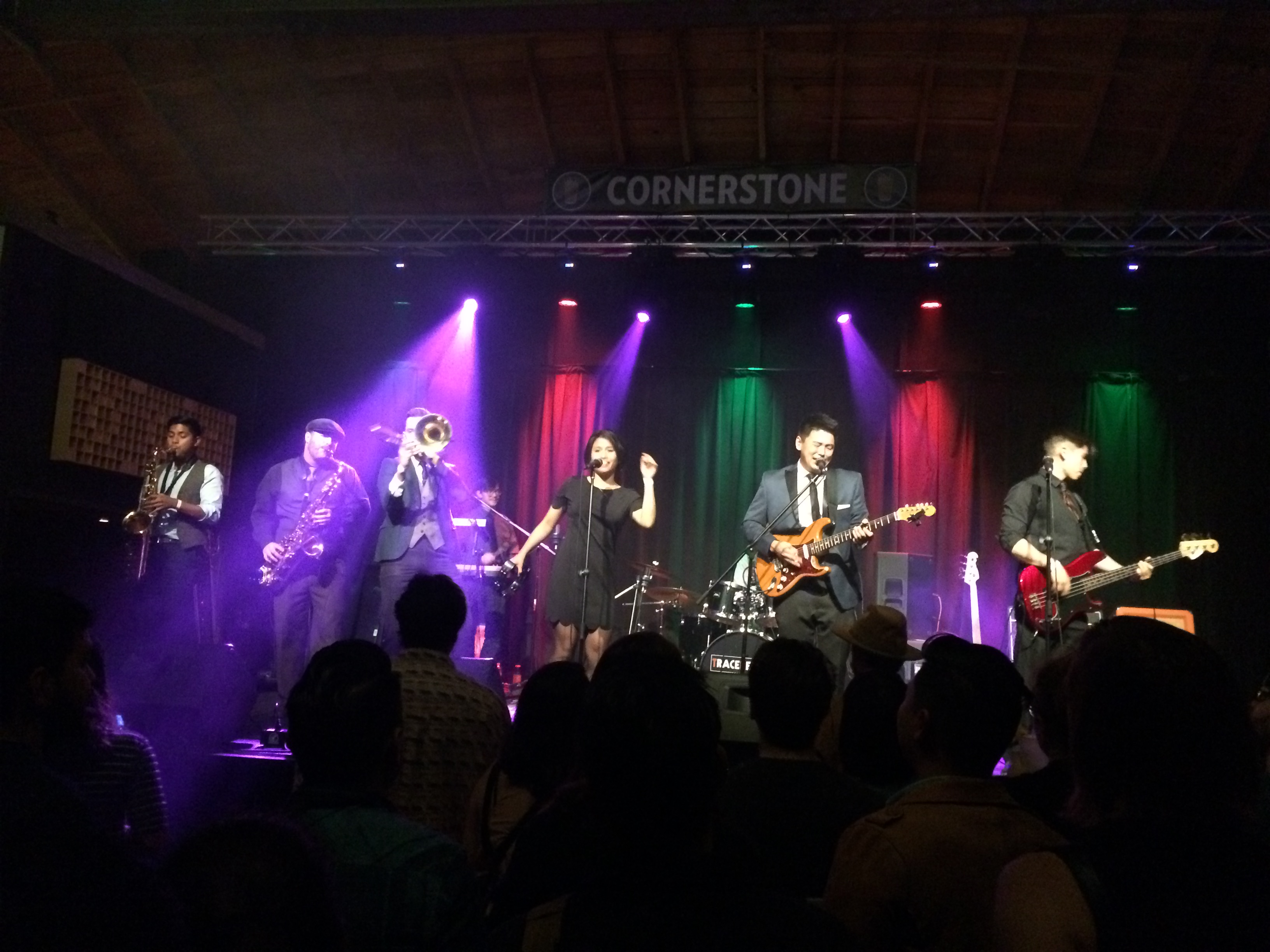
Trace Repeat live at Cornerstone in Berkeley, CA

Trace Repeat is a funk and soul band from Oakland, California.

== Background ==
Trace Repeat was founded in early 2015 by co-band leaders Wesley Woo and Zach Hing, drummer Ben Peterson, and ex-member/saxophonist Adam Dietz. The band began as a side project immediately following Woo's first tour to South by Southwest as a solo artist. The remaining band members (Dan Wilson, David Kaiser-Jones, Noah Foley-Beining, and Khrizia Kamille) joined the band after the original four members recorded and shopped around their first early demos in 2015.

Founder and co-band leader Zach Hing parted ways with Trace Repeat in August 2018 due to personal differences. The band's recording and touring schedule continued uninterrupted with its five remaining members, and contributions from Zach Parkes (bass), Rei Otsuka (bass), and Shawn Miller (bass).

In early 2019 the band officially announced Rei Otsuka as its permanent recording and touring bassist.

== Career ==
=== Kollaboration ===
Trace Repeat found its first early success in May 2016 after catching the attention of Kollaboration talent scout Lauren Lee, who helped the band reach the final round competition of Kollaboration STAR 2016. After winning Kollaboration’s regional competition in San Francisco, Trace Repeat had their first break on a national stage with their performance at Kollaboration STAR 2016, sharing the stage with artists like JR Aquino, Paul Dateh, Jane Lui, and Tim DeLaGhetto.

=== Asian American empowerment ===
Following their appearance at Kollaboration STAR, Trace Repeat continued to build momentum with the release of their Indiegogo crowdfunding campaign in January 2017. The campaign garnered media attention due to its focus on Asian American empowerment and the demasculinization of Asian American men in film and media. According to NBC Asian America, “While the band wasn't sure how people would respond to their overtly empowerment-themed campaign, the message resonated. Trace Repeat raised more than $8,000 — most of it from strangers — and surpassed their goal by more than 50 percent.”

=== The Oaktown Sound (2017) ===
Trace Repeat released their debut album The Oaktown Sound in September 2017. The album’s first print was released on CD, vinyl, and 3 ½ inch floppy disc. Alternative Press calls the album "intentionally referential to some of the 50s and 60s R&B you might hear on a James Brown or Ray Charles record. A lot of that high energy James Brown intensity, underscored by that Clyde Stubblefield 'funky drummer' kind of attitude in the rhythm section."

== Discography ==
=== Releases ===
==== Singles ====
Year	Title
2017	"Between U 2"; "Just as Simple"
2018	"Yeah"; "Kiss"; "Got 2 Give It Up"; "Rests with All the Mess"
2019	"Freakywichu"; "Forget You [Live]"; "Cream [Live]"; "Royals"; "Rests with All the Mess"; "When I've Got U"; "Fuck That Get Paid (FTGP)"
2020	"Head"; "Wilson Wong"; "Paris, Pt. 1"; "Paris, Pt. 2"; "Just Might"; "Dangerous"; "Let's Go Crazy"; "Love in a Box"; "One Week"; "Livin' La Vida Loca"; "Feels Like Summer"
2021	"Morning Love"

==== Album ====
===== The Oaktown Sound (2017) =====
Tracks
"Got 2 B Funky"
"Old School Funk"
"Between U 2"
"Just as Simple"
"Morning Love"
"Breakfast"
"Groovin'"
"I Do"
"Greatest Hits"

== Band members ==
=== Current members ===
- Wesley Woo - voice, guitar (2015–present)
- Ben Peterson - drums (2015–present)
- Daniel Wilson - tenor, baritone saxophone (2016–present)
- Khrizia Kamille - voice, percussion (2016–present)
- Maddie Liu - trombone (2019–present)
- Rei Otsuka - bass guitar, keys, synth (2018–present)
- Zach Thorne - trumpet (2018-present)

=== Frequent collaborators ===
- Brent Elberg - drums, keys (2019–present)
- Jeremy Propp - drums (2019-present)
- Adam Thomson - bass (2018–present)
- Shawn Miller - bass (2018–present)
- Zach Parkes - bass (2018–present)
- Alex Jimenez - bass (2019-present)
- Chris Lundeen - trombone (2019–present)
- Lindsay Alexis Smith - trombone (2018–present)
- Oscar Villagrana - trumpet (2019-present)
- Josh Sherman - trumpet (2019–present)
- Devin Hollister - tenor saxophone (2019–present)
- Noah Rosen - tenor saxophone (2019-present)
- Rocky Mandayam - alto saxophone (2019-present)
- Greg Yee - keys (2018–present)
- Mario Noche - percussion (2018–present)

=== Past collaborators ===
- Jae Jin - vocal, acoustic guitar (2019-2020)
- Brendan Dreaper - drums (2016–2017)
- Cadence Myles - drums (2017–2018)
- Chris Andersen - trombone (2018–2019)
- Cierra Davis - drums (2017–2018)
- Jesse Elkin Rubin - tenor, baritone saxophone (2017–2018)
- Matt Kelly - trumpet (2017–2018)
- Will Berg - alto saxophone (2017–2018)
- Zach Zarcone - drums (2017–2018)

=== Past members ===
- Adam Dietz - alto saxophone (2015–2016)
- David Kaiser-Jones - trombone (2016–2019)
- Ellisa Sun - voice (2015–2016)
- Heather Michelle - voice (2015–2016)
- Itoro Udofia - voice (2015–2016)
- Noah Foley-Beining - drums, keys, cowbell (2017–2019)
- Zach Hing - voice, guitar, bass (2015–2018)
- Froilan Vicente - tenor saxophone (2017–2018)
