= A Kitty Bobo Show =

2001 American animated pilot

- Created by: Kevin Kaliher; Meaghan Dunn
- Written by: Meaghan Dunn
- Directed by: Meaghan Dunn (art); Kevin Kaliher (animation)
- Voices of: Dante Basco; Miriam Flynn; Quinton Flynn; Nick Jameson; Lela Lee; Yuji Okumoto; Chris Williams
- Composer: Clay Morrow
- Country of origin: United States
- Original language: English

Production
- Cinematography: Paul Stec; Darrick Bachman (assistant)
- Running time: 7–8 minutes
- Production company: Cartoon Network Studios

Original release
- Network: Cartoon Network
- Release: August 17, 2001

A Kitty Bobo Show is an American animated television pilot created by Kevin Kaliher and Meaghan Dunn, and produced by Cartoon Network Studios for Cartoon Network. The pilot revolves around the eponymous character, Kitty Bobo (Dante Basco), as he tries to prove his coolness to his friends.

The premise is roughly based on Dunn's life as a Korean adoptee, and the main character had previously been featured in a comic strip by Dunn titled Kimchi Girl. The pilot aired on August 17, 2001, on the network as part of their Big Pick competition, a marathon of ten pilots with viewers selecting one to be produced for the network's fall 2002 season; the series lost second place to Codename: Kids Next Door.

== Synopsis ==
The pilot episode is titled "Cellphones".

Kitty Bobo is making his way to Poochee's Diner, where his friends, Paul Dog, Maggie and Monkey Carl, are waiting for him. Once inside, he boasts about his new cellphone, showing off his ringtone ("The Kitty Bobo Kool Kustom Ringer Song"), but refuses to reveal its provenance. Maggie brushes this off, since cellphones are so commonplace, but Paul points out they aren't in on the trend.

Maggie asks her friends to go to the movies with her. Paul and Monkey Carl can't go, so Maggie drags Kitty Bobo into the theater, annoyed at his obsession with his new phone. She is excited for the movie, having waited all summer to see it, but Kitty Bobo's cell phone rings in the theater. Maggie angrily tells him to turn off the phone since they're at the movies, but he puts it on vibrate mode instead. However, the cellphone vibrates throughout the movie. Eventually, he manages to annoy everyone in the theater, and gets kicked out.

That night, Kitty Bobo meets up with Paul, asking him to help in his plot to prove that he is cooler than Graffiti, since he has a phone. He strikes up a conversation with Graffiti, during which he has Paul call him through a nearby payphone, so he can take the fake call and show off his cellphone. When he thinks Graffiti is out of earshot, the two pat themselves on the back for the prank. However, Graffiti finds Paul on the payphone and foils the joke, telling Kitty Bobo that he will never be cool, even if he has a cell phone.

The next morning, while on his bike, Kitty Bobo calls Maggie, who tells him to stop talking about his cellphone and makes plans to meet up with him later that day. He then calls Paul and also makes plans to meet up with him at Poochee's. He texts Monkey Carl, but since he's not watching the road, he accidentally rides into a construction site and crashes his bike through a wall. He screams in horror when he realizes his cellphone is broken.

A disheveled Kitty Bobo arrives at Poochee's Diner and tells his friends the bad news. Much to his shock, he realizes that almost everybody, including his friends, now has a cell phone. The story ends with him, screaming in horror, again, as the camera zooms out to show everybody with cell phones.

== Characters ==
- Kitty Bobo (voiced by Dante Basco) – A 19–21-year-old yellow cat, who is the main character, Kitty Bobo is always trying to be fashionable, act cool before others, and become popular. Nevertheless, his awkward attempts to do so and his lack of consciousness of the world around him, constantly bring embarrassment to him and his friends, mostly for Maggie who considers Kitty Bobo's clueless personality a real nuisance. Despite being a cat, Kitty Bobo was raised by a couple of dogs "Mr. and Mrs. Bobo" whom he has a typical parents-child relationship.
- Maggie (voiced by Lela Lee) – A 19–21-year-old pink cat, who is one of Kitty Bobo's best and closest friends. Maggie is down-to-earth, moody, mature, hard to impress and somehow apathetic. Maggie is constantly annoyed by Kitty Bobo's awkward attempts to become cool and acts as the voice of reason in most of the cases. Nevertheless, despite Kitty's immaturity, Maggie might be somehow interested in Kitty Bobo, as Paul suggested by saying "You two have a good time", before She and kitty Bobo entered in a cinema alone. Maggie works in an office company; she loves horror movies and is a fan of punctuality.
- Paul Dog (voiced by Chris Williams) – A 19–21-year-old dog, who is one of Kitty Bobo's best and closest friends. Paul is laid back, easy going, he likes to stay in his comfort zone and cares little for what others think of him. Just as Maggie, he is irritated by Kitty Bobo's awkwardness, but in contrast to Maggie he is willing to help Kitty Bobo in his plans to impress others.
- Monkey Carl (voiced by Nick Jameson) – A 19–21-year-old monkey, who is one of Kitty Bobo's best and closest friends. Carl is lethargic, dispassionate, and the quietest of the group, but is constantly surprised by Kitty Bobo's lack of judgment. He likes computers and staying at home, he also has a very curious accent. Meaghan Dunn has mentioned before that his accent and language was based on Norwegian.

== Production ==
Concept art by Meaghan Dunn, featuring the main characters (see image details for character identification).

A Kitty Bobo Show was created by Kevin Kaliher and Meaghan Dunn; both were married as well as Korean adoptees. Kaliher graduated from the California Institute of the Arts and was hired by Cartoon Network to work as a storyboard artist on Dexter's Laboratory and The Powerpuff Girls. Dunn, an adoptee of American-Jewish parents, based the main character on her life experiences as an immigrant. In years prior to making the pilot, she had started a nonprofit organization for helping adopted children locate their biological parents. The character of Kitty Bobo had also been featured a comic strip by Dunn titled Kimchi Girl, which had been published in Korean Quarterly since its inception in 1997. Kaliher felt much of the impetus for the pilot came while searching for his birth family in Korea. However, Dunn later remarked that the pilot "had nothing to do with" her life.

The pilot was optioned by The Walt Disney Company before being turned down. Cartoon Network first approached Dunn in Los Angeles, then a comic shop employee. The network, impressed by her work in independent comics, which had spread through word of mouth, landed her a job at Cartoon Network Studios, and a few years later, she and Kaliher produced the pilot.

== Broadcast and reception ==
A Kitty Bobo Show aired on August 17, 2001, on Cartoon Network as part of their Big Pick competition, a marathon of ten pilots with viewers selecting one to be produced for the network's fall 2002 season. More than 200,000 votes were cast during the marathon, with 50,000 more being entered online. The pilot earned second place, losing to the pilot episode of Codename: Kids Next Door.

Editors of KoreAm reported that Korean-American adoptees would be able to see a reflection of themselves in the pilot. In a retrospective review of the show, Amid Amidi of the animation entertainment blog Cartoon Brew wrote that, relative to pilots produced by the network, Kitty Bobo had "some potential". He regarded its color styling and "appealing design" to be most memorable, while recalling it to have "decent storytelling" as well. Also writing retrospectively, Adam Finley of AOL TV, stated that, while "not side-splitting by any means," the pilot contained a few comedic elements. He praised the art style, contrasting it from other Cartoon Network programming. He ultimately opined that the short did not deserve to win, but that it would provide "a little more variety in style" for the network.

== Legacy ==
A storyboard for the second episode had been fully produced and completed in 2002, and it was ordered by Cartoon Network itself; in its plot Kitty Bobo is kicked out of his home and moves in with Monkey Carl (he proves to be a poor guest). Had the series been picked up, A Kitty Bobo Show would be the first to have a woman as a creator and showrunner (before Julie McNally Cahill as co-creator of My Gym Partner's a Monkey, Rebecca Sugar as sole creator of Steven Universe and Julia Pott as the creator of Summer Camp Island). Dunn divorced Kaliher in 2005 and moved to the East Coast along with her daughter to work as creative director for a 3D pharmaceutical studio in Baltimore. In fall of 2005, Kaliher pitched to Walt Disney Television Animation a pilot's revised version, with the characters a bit younger. Kaliher released a 50-page bible in 2006, exploring the Kitty Bobo's universe in more depth. Kaliher has since left the animation industry to pursue a career in software development.

Dunn returned in August 2010 to her hometown of Bucks County, Pennsylvania, to start her own animation and graphic-design company named Dunnamic. Following a stream of strictly commercial work, she created an idea for another animated series titled Chloe and the Stars. Dunn kept files from her work at Cartoon Network on a hard drive, which needed to be repaired before they could be retrieved. With her company no longer a startup, she and her employees developed the final designs for the characters of Chloe and the Stars and storyboarded its pilot. Upon receiving an animatic of the pilot, Frederator Studios agreed to donate and promote the series on Kickstarter. As a perk for donating $75 or more to the series, backers would have received the storyboard for the second episode of Kitty Bobo. It was later promoted as a "Staff Pick" on the website. However, it only made $11,623 out of its $35,000 goal. Dunn moved the project to Indiegogo but it made even less money than on Kickstarter since it only made $831 out of its $10,000 goal.
