= Undoing (film) =

- Theatrical release poster
- Directed by: Chris Chan Lee
- Written by: Chris Chan Lee
- Produced by: Karin Chien; Eric Y. Kim
- Starring: Russell Wong; Kelly Hu; Sung Kang; Tom Bower
- Cinematography: John DeFazio
- Music by: Ceiri Torjussen
- Release dates: June 24, 2006 (Los Angeles Film Festival); December 5, 2007 (United States)
- Country: United States
- Language: English

Undoing is a 2006 neo-noir drama film directed by Chris Chan Lee and starring Sung Kang, Tom Bower, Russell Wong, Kelly Hu, Jose Zuniga, Leonardo Nam and Bobby Lee. The film is set in the streets of Los Angeles' Koreatown and follows the story of Samuel Kim who returns after a mysterious one-year absence to find redemption from his past.

== Plot ==
After a mysterious year-long absence, Samuel Kim (Sung Kang) returns to Los Angeles determined to find redemption from the past. His mentor and only friend, Don Osa (Tom Bower), is a retired gangster with a parallel desire to leave the former world behind. But as Sam tries to balance revenge with reconciliation, he is drawn back to the shadowy world he left behind.

The story unfolds as we learn about the night, a year ago, when Sam and Joon (Leonardo Nam) meet for a joyride through Koreatown. Joon has more serious plans for the evening, but they soon go terribly wrong, leaving Sam alone and lost in a world he desperately wants to escape.

A year later, Sam returns to the scene of the crime, and with Don’s help, finishes what he should have done a year ago. But just as things appear to be resolved, we find out that Sam came back not only to avenge Joon’s death, but also to win back his love, Vera (Kelly Hu). Sam locates Vera working as a waitress/bar manager at the Red Room, and they’re suddenly thrown back into their impossible desires for each other; two people who seem hopelessly isolated from the world around them and from each other.

Abandoned a year ago, Vera resents Samuel and now finds herself deep in debt and also emotionally entangled with the owner of the Red Room, Randall (Jose Zuniga). With no family and no outside resources, Sam must return to the Koreatown streets of his past in attempt to settle Vera’s obligations, as well as his own debts to the past. His reckless naiveté leads him to hustle a corrupt, veteran police detective named Kasawa (Mary Mara). Unbeknownst to others, Kasawa and Sam’s mentor Don share a history in a former generation of inner-city crime.

== Cast ==
- Sung Kang as Samuel Kim
- Kelly Hu as Vera
- Russell Wong as Leon
- Tom Bower as Don Osa
- Jose Zuniga as Randall
- Leonardo Nam as Joon
