= Chris Chan Lee =

American filmmaker

- Born: San Francisco, California, U.S.
- Other name: Lee Sang-Bok
- Education: University of Southern California (BA)
- Occupation: Director
- Years active: 1992–present
- Known for: Making films about Asian-Americans
- Movement: Asian-American film
- Website: https://chrischanlee.com/

Chris Chan Lee is an American filmmaker. After graduating from the USC School of Cinematic Arts in Los Angeles, California, Lee wrote and directed Yellow, an independently financed feature film about the harrowing grad night of eight Korean-American teens in Los Angeles that culminates in a violent crime that will forever change their lives. Yellow was invited to over a dozen film festivals, including the Slamdance Dramatic Competition 1998, Singapore International 1998, and the Los Angeles Film Festival 1997. The film won the 1999 Golden Ring Award for Best Asian American Independent Film.

In 2002 Chris completed a one-year stint in Singapore directing television at MediaCorp Studios for English-language primetime TV series. In 2003, Lee was selected as one of three filmmakers for the Fast Track program sponsored by Filmmaker Magazine and the IFP Los Angeles Film Festival for his latest film, Undoing.

The movie, a character-driven neo-noir story set in Los Angeles, stars Sung Kang, Russell Wong, Kelly Hu and Leonardo Nam. It premiered at the Los Angeles Film Festival in July 2006.

Lee has also directed music videos for Asian American artists Seam and Mountain Brothers (such as "Galaxies: The Next Level"), which have aired on NTV, MTV, BET and more outlets.

Lee has also directed the most recent music video featuring a reunion of the Mountain Brothers on CHOPS or Scott "Chops" Jung's "Strength in Numbers" project, for a track entitled "Keep On" featuring vocals from Los Angeles-based artist Ann One.

Lee is considered to be a pioneer in making films about Asian Americans.
