= Tim Be Told =

Former American Christian music group

- Origin: Charlottesville, VA United States
- Genres: Pop; Gospel; Rock; R&B
- Years active: 2006–2015 (band) / 2016-presently solo
- Label: Independent
- Members: Tim Ouyang
- Past members: Jim Barredo; Parker Stanley; William Jin; Luan Nguyen; Tim Elder; Andrew Chae; Caleb Wu
- Website: Official Website

Tim Be Told was a Contemporary Christian music group founded in 2006 and originating in Charlottesville, VA, and since 2016 continuing as a solo act under the same name by band lead singer Tim Ouyang. Ouyang also works as an interior designer in San Francisco Bay Area

== Musical style ==
The musical style of the band incorporated elements of soul, pop, rock, gospel and blues. Their name was derived from the term "truth be told", where honesty is one of the band's focuses. Their goal within the music industry was to promote the themes of honesty, hope, redemption, and change. In 2008, they won the University of Virginia's "Battle of the Bands" competition. Despite their accomplishments, the band was still somewhat unknown in the traditional communities, including Christian radio. Much of this changed when the track "Analyze" off of their From the Inside album grew popular with various Contemporary Christian music outlets, such as the Gospel Music Channel, which used the video as their weekly feature.

== Members ==
Original members (since 2006)

- Tim Ouyang - lead singer, songwriter, keyboards (of Chinese origin)
- Andrew Chae - lead guitar (of Korean origin)
- Luan Nguyen - guitar, back-up vocalist (of Vietnamese origin)
- Jim Barredo - drummer (of Filipino origin)
- Parker Stanley (since 2007) - bass guitar

Joining in

- William Jin -
- Tim Elder -
- Caleb Wu (since 2011) - drums

=== Tim Ouyang ===
Tim Ouyang, born Timothy Ouyang, a Chinese American, was the lead singer and songwriter of Tim Be Told and now a solo carrying the name as a stage name. He is also a keyboard player and interior designer. He came out as gay in 2015. He resides in the California Bay Area. Tim has performed the national anthem for NBA's Golden State Warriors and produced and wrote for many including 106 & Park rapper and actor MC Jin and wrote "Secrets" for gospel singer Israel Houghton. The song was nominated for an Emmy in 2019.

== Break-up ==
With the 2016 album Friends and Foes, the group had disbanded and lead singer Tim Ouyang continued the project as a solo act. Soon afterward, he came out as gay. In 2020, Ouyang released a new album still keeping the name Tim Be Told. The album is titled Love and Happiness.

== Band career ==
=== Getting By and From the Inside ===
Tim Be Told released their debut LP, titled Getting By in 2007. Their second project was an EP titled From the Inside, which was released in 2009. The album was positively compared by critics to the likes of The Fray and Maroon 5, and was critically considered to be a leap forward for the band, due to what many considered to be a "more mature sound". After their second album was released, Tim Be Told was featured in Audrey magazine. and The Hook weekly, as well as played regularly on WCNR (106.1 the Corner) and on KBIF. Throughout the tour following From the Inside's release, Tim Be Told became more well known around college campuses, as well as the online Christian community.

=== Humanity ===
Throughout late 2010, Tim be Told lost three of its members, leaving only a two-man crew consisting of Timothy Ouyang and Andrew Chae. Although at that point most of the songs for their next album had already been written, Ouyang stated on a number of times that the album almost wasn't released and that the band was close to folding. However, they were able to complete the recording in early 2011, and shortly after, acquired new drummer Caleb Wu. In March, 2011, Tim Be Told announced that their new album, entitled Humanity would be shipped to the general public on March 22, 2011. There would also be 300 albums available for pre-order that would be shipped on March 20. Within a few days, the 300 albums were sold out, and ordering was opened to the public nine days later, on March 22.

On August 16, 2011, Tim Be Told released a completely new version of "Gravity's Hold", a song which first appeared on their debut album. The song was available to be purchased as a single, or was free when buying a digital copy of their Humanity album on their BandCamp page .

=== Mighty Sound ===
In late 2012, Tim Be Told made several updates on their Facebook page that they were in the process of preparing to record a new album, and subsequently began to play some new songs at their live shows, including "Winners and Losers" and "Temple of Stone". On March 21, 2013, Tim Be Told announced that the official title of their upcoming album would be Mighty Sound, and they held an artwork submission contest for the album cover. On December 10, 2013, Tim Be Told announced, along with pre-ordering, that the album would be available December 16, 2013. After the album's release, two music videos were filmed for the songs "The Battle Hymn" and "Mighty Sound".

== Solo career ==
Tim Ouyang (born Timothy Ouyang) is a singer, composer, record producer, mixer and graphic artist and interior designer in the San Francisco Bay Area. He studied music at Berklee College of Music.

=== Friends and Foes ===
Tim Be told released the album Friends and Foes in 2016. As the group had disbanded leaving the lead singer Tim Ouyang all alone, he decided to go on as a solo act recording the album with session musicians. The track "Lay Your Burdens Down" created the most interest as it considered the acceptance of homosexuality in Christian churches. Soon after in 2017, Tim Ouyang came out as gay, with the church absolving him of his role as a worship leader. He addressed the issue of his homosexuality in a personal blog and in an article in Inheritance Magazine in an article "The Dark Voice" on February 1, 2017 Most concert opportunities dried up for Tim with him considering quitting the music business altogether.

=== Love and Happiness ===
Tim Ouyang worked three years after coming out writing songs that he released in a recent solo album under the title Love and Happiness in 2020, but keeping the original band name Tim Be Told. Now as a gay Christian, he addressed in the album difficult subjects including experiences with love, disappointment, disbelief, faith, hope, and God, vulnerability as a gay man, decision to continue a closeted life as a believer or coming out, hypocrisy and corruption in the church, loneliness of the young in modern culture, etc.

== Discography ==
=== Albums and EPs ===
(Until 2016 as a band, starting 2016 as a solo act)

Title	Year	Label
Getting By	2007	Independent
From the Inside (EP)	2009	Independent
Humanity	2011	Independent
Mighty Sound	2013	Independent
Friends and Foes	2016	Independent
Love and Happiness	2020	Independent

Other albums

Title	Year	Label
Mighty Sound Deluxe	2015	Independent

=== Singles ===
(Until 2016 as a band, starting 2016 as a solo act)

Title	Year	Album
"Stand By Me"	2007	N/A
"Baby King"	2008	N/A
"Gravity's Hold" (New Version)	2011	N/A
"The Battle Hymn" (with Jae Jin, Michelle Chae, Psalm Bird, Calie Garrett)	2013	Mighty Sound
"Mighty Sound"	2014	Mighty Sound
"The Rising Sun" (feat. Calie Garrett and Yolonda Jones)	2014	N/A
"One Chance"	2014	N/A
"Toll The Bell"	2014	N/A
"End of the Day"	2014	N/A
"All Ye Nations" (feat. Calie Garrett, Dustin Keele, Jae Jin, Michelle Chae, Yolonda Jones)	2014	N/A
"Into the Stars" (feat. MC Jin)	2015	N/A
"Two Hearts On Fire"	2015	N/A
"Love Ain't No Love"	2015	Mighty Sound Deluxe
"Friends and Foes"	2016	Friends and Foes
"Weeping Into Praise"	2018	N/A
"Again"	2020	Love and Happiness
"Me to You"	2020	Love and Happiness
