= Phil Yu =

American blogger (born 1978)

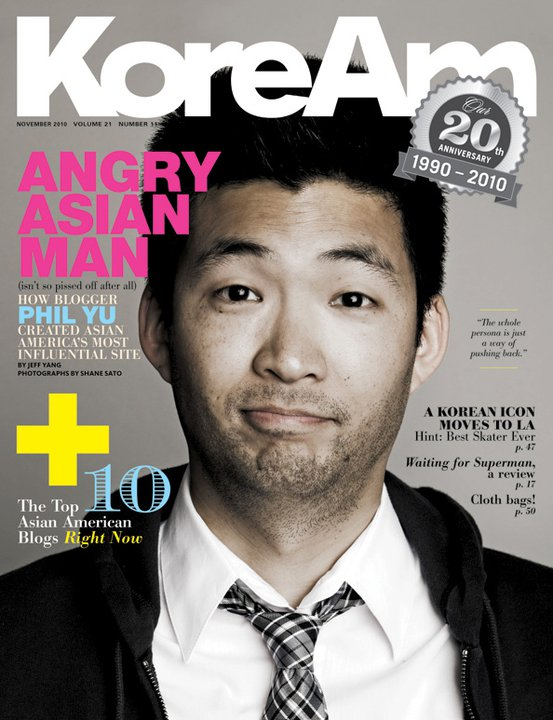
- Founder Phil Yu on the cover of KoreAm November 2010
- Education: Northwestern University
- Occupations: Blogger; Executive Producer
- Website: Blog.AngryAsianMan.com

Phil Yu (born 1978), also known as Angry Asian Man, is an American blogger.

== Early life and education ==
Yu's parents are immigrants from Korea. Yu grew up in the Bay Area in California.

Yu graduated with a Bachelor of Science in Radio/TV/Film from Northwestern University and earned a M.A. in Critical Studies from the University of Southern California School of Cinematic Arts (as a Provost Fellow).

== Career ==
Yu's commentary has been quoted or featured in The New York Times, NPR, the Los Angeles Times, CNN, The Washington Post, Gawker, and more.

Yu previously worked at the Center for Asian American Media in San Francisco, California, and also worked as a content producer for Yahoo! Movies – doing a number of segments for Fast & Furious 6 and other films. He currently serves as a board member for the Los Angeles-based Visual Communications, the annual producers of the Los Angeles Asian Pacific Film Festival. Yu appears in Evan Jackson Leong's documentary on Jeremy Lin, Linsanity, which screened at the 2013 Sundance Film Festival. He is also an Executive Producer of the action/comedy web series from the National Film Society duo of Patrick Epino and Stephen Dypiangco entitled Awesome Asian Bad Guys.

Yu received the 2012 Salute to Champions Award from the Japanese American Citizens League. He is also a recipient of the 2011 Asian Pacific Islander Heritage Award for Excellence in New Media from the California Asian Pacific Islander Legislative Caucus, the 2011 Public Image Award from Asian Americans Advancing Justice, and the 2011 Excellence in Media Award from OCA-Greater Los Angeles. In 2016, Yu received the Voice Award from the V3 Digital Media Conference, presented by the Asian American Journalists Association.

== Controversy ==
As of February 17, 2015, Yu is involved in a trademark and copyright infringement dispute with Lela Lee of Angry Little Asian Girl. The dispute was recently made public on each of their respective blogs. Both parties have since removed their blog posts in regards to the subject after an intensifying response from the public. There appears to be no resolution at this time.

== Accolades ==
- 2016 Voice Award from the V3 Digital Media Conferences, presented by The AAJA
- 2012 Salute to Champions Award from the Japanese American Citizens League
- 2011 Asian Pacific Islander Heritage Award for Excellence in New Media from the California Asian Pacific Islander Legislative Caucus
- 2011 Public Image Award from Asian Americans Advancing Justice
- 2011 Excellence in Media Award from OCA-Greater Los Angeles
- 2021 Legacy Peabody Award
