= Jimmy Lee (journalist) =

American journalist (1972–2021)

Jimmy Lee (1972–2021) was a Korean American journalist.

He served as managing editor of KoreAm Journal from 1999 to 2007.

Lee was born in Seoul, Korea, and immigrated to California at the age of 11 months with his family. He was raised in Orange County, California. He graduated from UCLA in 1994 with a degree in Geography.

He had worked at the Korean Youth and Community Center in Los Angeles.

== Honors and awards ==
- In 2004, he was the runner-up of a New California Media Award for his article O Sister, Here Art Thou.
