= KoreAm =

Korean American magazine

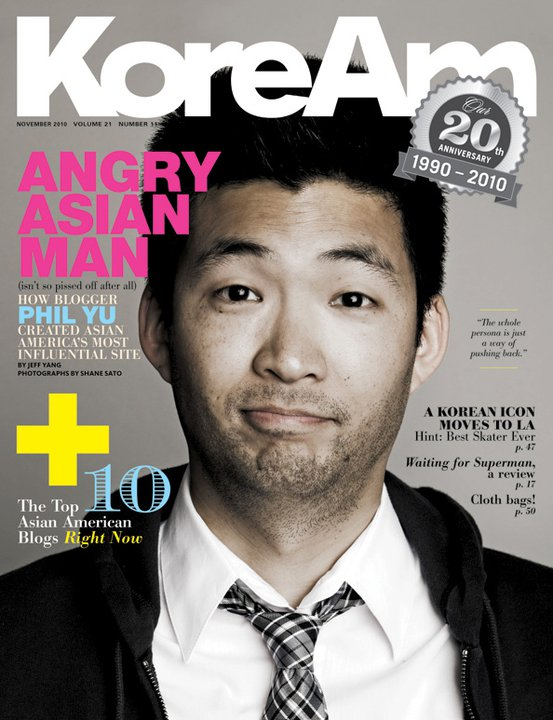
- Cover of the issue from November 2010, featuring Angry Asian Man founder Phil Yu and highlighting the magazine's 20th anniversary
- Editor: Julie Ha
- Categories: Ethnic press
- Frequency: Monthly
- Publisher: James Ryu
- Founded: 1990
- Final issue: December 2015
- Company: London Trust Media
- Country: United States
- Based in: Gardena, California
- Language: English
- Website: www.iamKoreAm.com
- ISSN: 1541-1931

KoreAm, or KoreAm Journal, was a monthly print magazine published from 1990 to December 2015. It was dedicated to news, commentary, politics, lifestyle and culture published in the United States. It was the oldest and most widely circulated English-language monthly magazine for the Asian American community. The magazine has featured prominent Asian American leaders, politicians, artists, entertainers, athletes and entrepreneurs. It also covered current events related to North Korea, South Korea, Asian Americans, immigrants and communities of color.

In 2018, the publication relaunched as KORE magazine. In April 2019, KORE rebranded as Character Media.

== History ==
KoreAm was founded by Jung Shig Ryu and James Ryu in 1990 in Los Angeles, California.

The magazine highlighted news, stories, op-ed pieces and entertainment for the Kyopo community—ethnic Koreans living overseas, and primarily Koreans in the United States. The magazine highlighted Korean American perspectives on matters related to Korea, including North Korea's nuclear program, reunification, the six-party talks, the deaths of South Korean presidents, the globalization of South Korean pop culture, and peninsular tensions and conflicts. The magazine also addressed biracial and adoptee communities. KoreAm was the most widely circulated, longest-running, independent English-language publication serving the Korean American community.

Two years after KoreAm's founding, the magazine became a major forum for the Korean community relating to the 1992 Los Angeles riots. The riots caused violence, arson, looting and lawlessness. Korean-run businesses were targeted during what has been dubbed this nation's first "multiethnic riot."

KoreAm featured prominent Korean Americans on its cover. These stories included Margaret Cho, John Cho, Daniel Dae Kim, Jane Kim, and Michelle Rhee. Stories also included a profile on Pinkberry founder Shelly Hwang, a ground level feature on the Virginia Tech massacre, as well as packages on health care reform, education reform, gays in the military, and Korean Americans affected by Hurricane Katrina.

In 2003, KoreAm launched a sister publication, Audrey Magazine.

The magazine's official website was launched in 2009.

London Trust Media, now Imperial Family Companies, acquired the magazine in 2014. The magazine ceased publication in December 2015.

In 2021, an archive of previously published issues was created.

== Staff ==
Editorial

Julie Ha, Editor-in-Chief
Michelle Woo, Online Editor
Jiyoon Kim, Art Director

Marketing & Advertising

James Ryu, Publisher
Joyce Park, Marketing Director
Esther Kim, Operations Manager

Former Editors

Corina Knoll
Jimmy Lee
John Lee
Kai Ma
Larry Tazuma

== Publication history ==
=== 1990 ===
| Issue | Date | Cover Story |
|---|---|---|
| Vol. 1 No. 1 | April 1990 | Get Involved! |
| Vol. 1 No. 2 | May 1990 | Perspectives on the REAL Oldest Profession |
| Vol. 1 No. 3 | June 1990 | Koreans Take Vacations? Oh Yes They Do... |
| Vol. 1 No. 4 | July 1990 | North Korean Resistance to Reform Will Determine her Fate |
| Vol. 1 No. 5 | August 1990 | |
| Vol. 1 No. 6 | September 1990 | |
| Vol. 1 No. 7 | October 1990 | United Motherland Still an Elusive Dream |
| Vol. 1 No. 8 | November 1990 | LA and OC College Students Unite |
| Vol. 1 No. 9 | December 1990 | Koreans Lack Thanksgiving Spirit |

=== 1991 ===
| Issue | Date | Cover Story |
|---|---|---|
| Vol. 2 No. 1 | January 1991 | Anti-Asian Crimes Abound in 1990 |
| Vol. 2 No. 2 | February 1991 | KAs Take Stand on Gulf War |
| Vol. 2 No. 3 | March 1991 | KA Churches Provide Foundation |
| Vol. 2 No. 4 | April 1991 | KAs Seek Political Empowerment |
| Vol. 2 No. 5 | May 1991 | New Beginning for Blacks, Koreans |
| Vol. 2 No. 6 | June 1991 | |
| Vol. 2 No. 7 | July 1991 | New Life for Forsaken Korean Children |
| Vol. 2 No. 8 | August 1991 | Spicing Up the Summer |
| Vol. 2 No. 9 | September 1991 | Meeting the needs of the Community |
| Vol. 2 No. 10 | October 1991 | The Humanness of Death |
| Vol. 2 No. 11 | November 1991 | View from Outside |
| Vol. 2 No. 12 | December 1991 | True Meaning of Christmas |

=== 1992 ===
| Issue | Date | Cover Story |
|---|---|---|
| Vol. 3 No. 1 | January 1992 | Special: The Korean Community, 1992 |
| Vol. 3 No. 2 | February 1992 | Special: Timely Advice from Tax Experts |
| Vol. 3 No. 3 | March 1992 | Karlin Controversy: Politics in Justice |
| Vol. 3 No. 4 | April 1992 | Recession Hits Koreatown, U.S.A. |
| Vol. 3 No. 5 | May 1992 | |
| Vol. 3 No. 6 | June 1992 | Rebuilding Our Community |
| Vol. 3 No. 7 | July 1992 | Inside: Bill Clinton National Economic Strategy |
| Vol. 3 No. 8 | August 1992 | Golden Moment |
| Vol. 3 No. 9 | September 1992 | |
| Vol. 3 No. 10 | October 1992 | Decision Time |
| Vol. 3 No. 11 | November 1992 | |
| Vol. 3 No. 12 | December 1992 | Homeless for the Holidays |

=== 1993 ===
| Issue | Date | Cover Story |
|---|---|---|
| Vol. 4 No. 1 | January 1993 | 1992 Recorded |
| Vol. 4 No. 2 | February 1993 | Double Jeopardy |
| Vol. 4 No. 3 | March 1993 | Inside: A Conversation With Ted Oh After the L.A. Open |
| Vol. 4 No. 4 | April 1993 | 4.29: Not Just A Memory |
| Vol. 4 No. 5 | May 1993 | Wooing L.A. |
| Vol. 4 No. 6 | June 1993 | Going Inside Hollywood with Phillip Rhee |
| Vol. 4 No. 7 | July 1993 | Three, Plus One, On the Edge |
| Vol. 4 No. 8 | August 1993 | The Queer Issue |
| Vol. 4 No. 9 | September 1993 | Interracial Relationships |
| Vol. 4 No. 10 | October 1993 | A Violent World at Home |
| Vol. 4 No. 11 | November 1993 | HIV AIDS: Korean Americans on Death and Living |
| Vol. 4 No. 12 | December 1993 | The Hard Life of a Korean American Grocer |

=== 1994 ===
| Issue | Date | Cover Story |
|---|---|---|
| Vol. 5 No. 1 | January 1994 | 1993-1994 |
| Vol. 5 No. 2 | February 1994 | |
| Vol. 5 No. 3 | March 1994 | New Kid in Town |
| Vol. 5 No. 4 | April 1994 | Sports Fever |
| Vol. 5 No. 5 | May 1994 | Korean American Women of the 90s |
| Vol. 5 No. 6 | June 1994 | |
| Vol. 5 No. 7 | July 1994 | America in Perspective: A Reality Check for Korean Americans from North South East and West |
| Vol. 5 No. 8 | August 1994 | From Standup to Sitcom: Korean-American Comedienne Margaret Cho Approaches Stardom a Heartbeat Away |
| Vol. 5 No. 9 | September 1994 | Young at Heart |
| Vol. 5 No. 10 | October 1994 | Invisible Disease |
| Vol. 5 No. 11 | November 1994 | Election '94 |
| Vol. 5 No. 12 | December 1994 | High Times |

=== 1995 ===
| Issue | Date | Cover Story |
|---|---|---|
| Vol. 6 No. 1 | January 1995 | |
| Vol. 6 No. 2 | February 1995 | The Aftershock of Sexual Harassment |
| Vol. 6 No. 3 | March 1995 | The Solid Gold Mountain |
| Vol. 6 No. 4 | April 1995 | Hopeless Ground... |
| Vol. 6 No. 5 | May 1995 | Consumer Asian America: Inside the New Frontier |
| Vol. 6 No. 6 | June 1995 | House of Love: One Man's Journey and His Crusade Against Addiction |
| Vol. 6 No. 7 | July 1995 | Golden Years |
| Vol. 6 No. 8 | August 1995 | Disaster in Seoul |
| Vol. 6 No. 9 | September 1995 | Chongshindae: A Crime Against Humanity |
| Vol. 6 No. 10 | October 1995 | War Against Immigrants |
| Vol. 6 No. 11 | November 1995 | Korean Americans Deliberate on the Simpson Verdict and the Divided Country |
| Vol. 6 No. 12 | December 1995 | Praying for a Miracle |

=== 1996 ===
| Issue | Date | Cover Story |
|---|---|---|
| Vol. 7 No. 1 | January 1996 | 1996 Preview; 1995 in Review |
| Vol. 7 No. 2 | February 1996 | Unifying the Community |
| Vol. 7 No. 3 | March 1996 | Hey, Mr. DJ! |
| Vol. 7 No. 4 | April 1996 | Silent Voices No More |
| Vol. 7 No. 5 | May 1996 | Fearsome Foursome |
| Vol. 7 No. 6 | June 1996 | A Woman's Legacy: Helie Lee and K. Connie Kang |
| Vol. 7 No. 7 | July 1996 | Our Silence is Deafening |
| Vol. 7 No. 8 | August 1996 | Touching the Hearts of the Untouchable |
| Vol. 7 No. 9 | September 1996 | The Society of Heritage Performers |
| Vol. 7 No. 10 | October 1996 | United We Stand. Divided We Fall |
| Vol. 7 No. 11 | November 1996 | When Tensions Run Aground |
| Vol. 7 No. 12 | December 1996 | Rekindling the Lost Memory of Love |

=== 1997 ===
| Issue | Date | Cover Story |
|---|---|---|
| Vol. 8 No. 1 | January 1997 | KoreAm 1996: A Look Back |
| Vol. 8 No. 2 | February 1997 | AAs Flock to Washington |
| Vol. 8 No. 3 | March 1997 | Patricia Shin: Meet the Press |
| Vol. 8 No. 4 | April 1997 | Do You Remember 'Sa-I-Gu'? |
| Vol. 8 No. 5 | May 1997 | The Quagmire of Race: The Community Coalition and the Liquor Store Controversy |
| Vol. 8 No. 6 | June 1997 | Tough Women |
| Vol. 8 No. 7 | July 1997 | The President's Choice: Angela Oh |
| Vol. 8 No. 8 | August 1997 | |
| Vol. 8 No. 9 | September 1997 | Tragedy of Korean Air Flight 801 |
| Vol. 8 No. 10 | October 1997 | Shining Bright in Watts |
| Vol. 8 No. 11 | November 1997 | Rockin' the World |
| Vol. 8 No. 12 | December 1997 | In the Absence of Son |

=== 1998 ===
| Issue | Date | Cover Story | Subheading |
|---|---|---|---|
| Vol. 9 No. 1 | January 1998 | Three Times Ahn | The Ahn Trio: Classical Music Never Looked So Good |
| Vol. 9 No. 2 | February 1998 | Wonder Twin Powers (Politically) Activate! | Chicago's Pugh sisters are making waves from IL to Capitol Hill |
| Vol. 9 No. 3 | March 1998 | Reels of Fortune | Fortune4's Asian Am Showcase in the Indie City |
| Vol. 9 No. 4 | April 1998 | Jay C. The Politically Incorrect Kim | |
| Vol. 9 No. 5 | May 1998 | With All His Friend's Waiting... | Sin's gonna be late...in Yellow—a movie about fear and facing up |
| Vol. 9 No. 6 | June 1998 | Chairmen of the Board | Pro skateboarders Daewon Song and Gideon Choi |
| Vol. 9 No. 7 | July 1998 | And the Winner is... | Arli$$ star Sandra Oh's got talent, wit and a bevy of best actress awards. Could the Oscars be next? |
| Vol. 9 No. 8 | August 1998 | The 100th issue | |
| Vol. 9 No. 9 | September 1998 | Se Ri's Iron Will | |
| Vol. 9 No. 10 | October 1998 | Reaping What They Sew | Three fashion designers: Each has a vision through the eye of a needle |
| Vol. 9 No. 11 | November 1998 | Pacific Power | Four in Hawaii impact the islands |
| Vol. 9 No. 12 | December 1998 | The Silent Famine | |

=== 1999 ===
| Issue | Date | Cover Story | Subheading |
|---|---|---|---|
| Vol. 10 No. 1 | January 1999 | Mother Nature's Son | Environmentalist, author, retired CEO by age 21. Media-savvy Danny Seo is just getting started. Can his name brand save the earth? |
| Vol. 10 No. 2 | February 1999 | The Cho Must Go On | After several years out of the spotlight, comedian Margaret Cho returns under a different glow |
| Vol. 10 No. 3 | March 1999 | Born Again...Gay | Queers on sexual conversion and the ex-gay miniseries |
| Vol. 10 No. 4 | April 1999 | Angel of the City | |
| Vol. 10 No. 5 | May 1999 | Spice on Ice | America's newest skating sensation, 13-year-old Naomi Nari Nam |
| Vol. 10 No. 6 | June 1999 | 50 Novel Ideas | and the Korean Americans who put them in writing |
| Vol. 10 No. 7 | July 1999 | Love and Hapa-ness | Profiles of the mixed-race experience |
| Vol. 10 No. 8 | August 1999 | Mouse Hunt | 10 websites to seek out |
| Vol. 10 No. 9 | September 1999 | Return of the Native | Chang-Rae Lee's second novel confronts the touchy topic of comfort women |
| Vol. 10 No. 10 | October 1999 | Where are all the good Korean men? | |
| Vol. 10 No. 11 | November 1999 | No Gun Ri: A Bridge to the Past | Recent allegations of wholesale civilian slaughter by American troops spark memories of Korean War |
| Vol. 10 No. 12 | December 1999 | Risky Business | Rick Yune Gambles on Showbiz and Wins |

=== 2000 ===
| Issue | Date | Cover Story | Subheading |
|---|---|---|---|
| Vol. 11 No. 1 | January 2000 | Building a Legacy | Architect Vernon Pounds and his latest creation, the Staples Center |
| Vol. 11 No. 2 | February 2000 | Love Korean American Style | KoreAm Asks 16 Celebrities to Reveal Their Secrets on Romance |
| Vol. 11 No. 3 | March 2000 | Finding the Right Notes | Violin virtuosos Sarah Chang, Richard Chon and Cara Chang are playing their own tunes |
| Vol. 11 No. 4 | April 2000 | Naked Truth | Playboy Model/Actress Sung Hi Lee |
| Vol. 11 No. 5 | May 2000 | Incredible Journey | The Adopted Korean American Experience |
| Vol. 11 No. 6 | June 2000 | Portraits of War | Sharing the Tragedies & Triumphs of the Korean War - 50 Years Later |
| Vol. 11 No. 7 | July 2000 | The Natural | Slugger Hee Seop Choi Goes From A Kwangju Farm to Chicago Cubs Farm |
| Vol. 11 No. 8 | August 2000 | Will Power | Actor Will Yun lee's got a mind for success |
| Vol. 11 No. 9 | September 2000 | A Golden Sacrifice | Esther Kim's unlikely path to Olympic Triumph |
| Vol. 11 No. 10 | October 2000 | The Producer | Patrick Choi's "The Watcher" debuts at Number One |
| Vol. 11 No. 11 | November 2000 | Funny People 101 | Three Korean American class clowns at comedy's school of hard knocks |
| Vol. 11 No. 12 | December 2000 | A Man of Import | T.S. Chung plays politics at the U.S. Department of Commerce |

=== 2001 ===
| Issue | Date | Cover Story | Subheading |
|---|---|---|---|
| Vol. 12 No. 1 | January 2001 | O Pioneers! | The legendary lives of KAs on the frontier |
| Vol. 12 No. 2 | February 2001 | Bound By Love | Relationships that persevere across borders and stigmas |
| Vol. 12 No. 3 | March 2001 | Man of Steel | The riveting life of Young Paik |
| Vol. 12 No. 4 | April 2001 | The ABCs of Juju Chang | Getting the scoop on this network news reporter |
| Vol. 12 No. 5 | May 2001 | Anger Management | Lela Lee's therapy for success |
| Vol. 12 No. 6 | June 2001 | Our Philanthropists | Who They Are & Why They Give |
| Vol. 12 No. 7 | July 2001 | Oral Fix | The Chun sisters taste success |
| Vol. 12 No. 8 | August 2001 | Nicole Bilderback: American Soul | |
| Vol. 12 No. 9 | September 2001 | College Life | What You Don't Want Your Parents to Know |
| Vol. 12 No. 10 | October 2001 | September 11, 2001 | |
| Vol. 12 No. 11 | November 2001 | Cool and Savvy | They are changing Hollywood |
| Vol. 12 No. 12 | December 2001 | Ho Ho Ho...Merry Christmas | Bobby Lee gets his wish |

=== 2002 ===
| Issues | Date | Cover Story | Subheading |
|---|---|---|---|
| Vol. 13 No. 1 | January 2002 | Janet Choi | Living In The Real World |
| Vol. 13 No. 2 | February 2002 | Just Say Noh | FBI Special Agent Steven Noh |
| Vol. 13 No. 3 | March 2002 | Green Dreams | Following 17-year-old Kevin Na's path from high school dropout to PGA wannabe |
| Vol. 13 No. 4 | April 2002 | The Messengers | The L.A. Riots Ten Years Later: Signed, Sealed, Delivered |
| Vol. 13 No. 5 | May 2002 | Helie Lee | Here Comes The Sun |
| Vol. 13 No. 6 | June 2002 | Model Minority? | Hard-working, Studious and Serving 19 to Life |
| Vol. 13 No. 7 | July 2002 | Red Hot | Korea On Fire at the World Cup |
| Vol. 13 No. 8 | August 2002 | Margaret Cho | At Home Sweet Home |
| Vol. 13 No. 9 | September 2002 | Soul Sister | Singer Amerie Brings Some Soul to R&B |
| Vol. 13 No. 10 | October 2002 | Ahn Divided = Maria, Angella & Lucia | |
| Vol. 13 No. 11 | November 2002 | Bad Boy | Rick Yune Plays James Bond's Latest Nemesis |
| Vol. 13 No. 12 | December 2002 | FORE! It's Tee Time for This Fearsome Foursome | |

=== 2003 ===
| Issues | Date | Cover Story | Subheading |
|---|---|---|---|
| Vol. 14 No. 1 | January 2003 | American Passage | Exploring Our Immigrant Heritage |
| Vol. 14 No. 2 | February 2003 | The Big Break | Will "Better Luck Tomorrow" Be A Break-Out Film For Asian America? |
| Vol. 14 No. 3 | March 2003 | Bo Means Business | Korea's Latest Export Myung Bo Hong is Here to Kick Some Grass |
| Vol. 14 No. 4 | April 2003 | Sweet Fighter | In This Corner: Grandma Kim For Bus Rider Justice |
| Vol. 14 No. 5 | May 2003 | All About the Benjamin | Banker Ben Hong in the Business of Reversing Fortunes |
| Vol. 14 No. 6 | June 2003 | O No! | Here Come Karen O and the Yeah Yeah Yeahs |
| Vol. 14 No. 7 | July 2003 | Good Morning, America | ABC News Anchor Liz Cho Delivers the Early Edition |
| Vol. 14 No. 8 | August 2003 | Pass the Mic | Can This Face Make it in Hip-Hop? |
| Vol. 14 No. 9 | September 2003 | The Force Behind Batman | Comic Book Legend Jim Lee Gives Life to The Dark Knight |
| Vol. 14 No. 10 | October 2003 | Cover Price | Lindsay Price: Front and Center on NBC's "Coupling" |
| Vol. 14 No. 11 | November 2003 | Mr. Hahn | DJ, Filmmaker, Artist: Linkin Park's Joseph Hahn Does It All |
| Vol. 14 No. 12 | December 2003 | Life's A Stage | Spotlighting New Yorkers with a Passion for Theatrics |

=== 2004 ===
| Issue | Date | Cover Story | Subheading |
|---|---|---|---|
| Vol. 15 No. 1 | January 2004 | Ticket To Ride | Will Lee Breaks Speed Limits and Hollywood Stereotypes in the Movie "Torque" with Director Joseph Kahn |
| Vol. 15 No. 2 | February 2004 | Dawson's Peak | High Flyin', Freestyling Toby Dawson Looks to Turn Air into Olympic Gold |
| Vol. 15 No. 3 | March 2004 | Jokers Wild | These Comdedic Cards Crack Up a Full House |
| Vol. 15 No. 4 | April 2004 | 14 Years Old! | Golf's New Hot Shot, Michelle Wie |
| Vol. 15 No. 5 | May 2004 | Loud Speakers | The Voices of Spoken Word Artists |
| Vol. 15 No. 6 | June 2004 | Air Jaden | U.S. Marine Captain Jaden Kim Flies the Not-So-Friendly Skies |
| Vol. 15 No. 7 | July 2004 | Man on Fire | John Cho Blazes a Trail in "Harold & Kumar Go to White Castle" |
| Vol. 15 No. 8 | August 2004 | He's Got A Shot | But Can 18-year-old Seung Jin Ha Make it in The NBA? |
| Vol. 15 No. 9 | September 2004 | Sonja Sohn | Undercover with the Actress From HBO's "The Wire" |
| Vol. 15 No. 10 | October 2004 | Get "Lost" With Yunjin Kim and Daniel Dae Kim | |
| Vol. 15 No. 11 | November 2004 | One of Us | Janice Min, editor-in-chief of Us Weekly |
| Vol. 15 No. 12 | December 2004 | Solo Acts | Moms Raising Kids on Their Own |

=== 2005 ===
| Issue | Date | Cover Story | Cover Star |
|---|---|---|---|
| Vol. 16 No. 1 | January 2005 | Cross Over Move | Park Jin young |
| Vol. 16 No. 2 | February 2005 | Susie Cued | Susie Suh |
| Vol. 16 No. 3 | March 2005 | The Sundance Shuffle | Michael Kang and Sung Kang |
| Vol. 16 No. 4 | April 2005 | On the Beat | Irene Crews |
| Vol. 16 No. 5 | May 2005 | New Wave | Stephanie Limb |
| Vol. 16 No. 6 | June 2005 | In Poor Health | |
| Vol. 16 No. 7 | July 2005 | Thrown a Curve | Chan Ho Park |
| Vol. 16 No. 8 | August 2005 | Sitting Pretty | Sandra Oh |
| Vol. 16 No. 9 | September 2005 | Hines Ward | Hines Ward |
| Vol. 16 No. 10 | October 2005 | In Katrina's Wake | |
| Vol. 16 No. 11 | November 2005 | Fortune Teller | Dr. Sung Won Sohn |
| Vol. 16 No. 12 | December 2005 | Church Matters | |

=== 2006 ===
| Issue | Date | Cover Story | Cover Star |
|---|---|---|---|
| Vol. 17 No. 1 | January 2006 | Portrait of an Artist | David Choe |
| Vol. 17 No. 2 | February 2006 | Blade Runner | Halie Kim |
| Vol. 17 No. 3 | March 2006 | Court Side Manner | Kevin Kim |
| Vol. 17 No. 4 | April 2006 | Sexy Robot | Grace Park |
| Vol. 17 No. 5 | May 2006 | Ready for the World | |
| Vol. 17 No. 6 | June 2006 | Action Figures | Lee Jung Jae and Jang Dong Gun |
| Vol. 17 No. 7 | July 2006 | Street Racers | Sung Kang, Leonardo Nam and Brian Tee |
| Vol. 17 No. 8 | August 2006 | Will Demps | Will Demps |
| Vol. 17 No. 9 | September 2006 | Dae Time | Daniel Dae Kim |
| Vol. 17 No. 10 | October 2006 | Seoul Lions | Yeah Yeah Yeahs |
| Vol. 17 No. 11 | November 2006 | Suchin Pak | Suchin Pak |
| Vol. 17 No. 12 | December 2006 | Lady Jane | Jane Kim |

=== 2007 ===
| Issue | Date | Cover Story | Cover Star |
|---|---|---|---|
| Vol. 18 No. 1 | January 2007 | Rush of Faith | Emmanuel Moody |
| Vol. 18 No. 2 | February 2007 | The $1M Man | Yul Kwon |
| Vol. 18 No. 3 | March 2007 | Who is Nikki S. Lee? | Nikki S. Lee |
| Vol. 18 No. 4 | April 2007 | Moon Shine | Moon Bloodgood |
| Vol. 18 No. 5 | May 2007 | Our Country, Our Tragedy | Virginia Tech |
| Vol. 18 No. 6 | June 2007 | Rain: Ready to Take America by Storm | Rain |
| Vol. 18 No. 7 | July 2007 | Changing Course | Toby Dawson |
| Vol. 18 No. 8 | August 2007 | Funny Girl | Margaret Cho |
| Vol. 18 No. 9 | September 2007 | Man of Action | Will Yun Lee |
| Vol. 18 No. 10 | October 2007 | Street Smarts | Bobby Hundreds |
| Vol. 18 No. 11 | November 2007 | Fashion's Most Wanted | Joy Han |
| Vol. 18 No. 12 | December 2007 | Angela Park | Angela Park |

=== 2008 ===
| Issue | Date | Cover Story | Cover Star |
|---|---|---|---|
| Vol. 19 No. 1 | January 2008 | Rock of Love | Meg & Dia |
| Vol. 19 No. 2 | February 2008 | Pop Exports | Tim |
| Vol. 19 No. 3 | March 2008 | They're Back | John Cho and Kal Penn |
| Vol. 19 No. 4 | April 2008 | The Sweet Life | Shelly Hwang |
| Vol. 19 No. 5 | May 2008 | Full House | Jon and Kate Gosselin |
| Vol. 19 No. 6 | June 2008 | In View | Priscilla Ahn |
| Vol. 19 No. 7 | July 2008 | The Mighty Penn | BJ Penn |
| Vol. 19 No. 8 | August 2008 | Worth It? The High Price of Gambling | |
| Vol. 19 No. 9 | September 2008 | Wonder Boys | Aaron Yoo, Leonardo Nam and Justin Chon |
| Vol. 19 No. 10 | October 2008 | Wildcat | C.J. Bacher |
| Vol. 19 No. 11 | November 2008 | Sassy Girl | Smith Cho |
| Vol. 19 No. 12 | December 2008 | The People, Events and Issues That Shaped 2008 | |

=== 2009 ===
| Issue | Date | Cover Story | Cover Star |
|---|---|---|---|
| Vol. 20 No. 1 | January 2009 | SE7EN: Will the K-pop star get lucky? | Seven |
| Vol. 20 No. 2 | February 2009 | | |
| Vol. 20 No. 3 | March 2009 | Reimagining Koreatown | |
| Vol. 20 No. 4 | April 2009 | Jamie and Joon | Jamie Chung and Joon Park |
| Vol. 20 No. 5 | May 2009 | Oh, BoA! | BoA |
| Vol. 20 No. 6 | June 2009 | Top Chef | David Chang |
| Vol. 20 No. 7 | July 2009 | Why North Korea Matters | |
| Vol. 20 No. 8 | August 2009 | Out. | Lt. Dan Choi |
| Vol. 20 No. 9 | September 2009 | Amerie Unleashed! | Amerie |
| Vol. 20 No. 10 | October 2009 | South Korea Made Daniel Henney A Star | Daniel Henney |
| Vol. 20 No. 11 | November 2009 | Can You Afford to Get Sick | |
| Vol. 20 No. 12 | December 2009 | Education Reformer Michelle Rhee | Michelle Rhee |

=== 2010 ===
| Issue | Date | Cover Story | Cover Star |
|---|---|---|---|
| Vol. 21 No. 1 | January 2010 | World Series Pitcher Chan Ho Park Refuses to Call It Quits | Chan Ho Park |
| Vol. 21 No. 2 | February 2010 | Sci-Fi Siren Grace Park | Grace Park |
| Vol. 21 No. 3 | March 2010 | Will You Count? The Census Matters More Than You Think | |
| Vol. 21 No. 4 | April 2010 | Daniel Dae Kim | Daniel Dae Kim |
| Vol. 21 No. 5 | May 2010 | Gen 3 | |
| Vol. 21 No. 6 | June 2010 | Se Ri Pak Is Back! | Se Ri Pak |
| Vol. 21 No. 7 | July 2010 | Stealth Saves the Day | |
| Vol. 21 No. 8 | August 2010 | 2PM: K-Pop's boys of the hour | 2PM |
| Vol. 21 No. 9 | September 2010 | Generation You | Bart Kwan and Joe Jo (justkiddingfilms), Clara C, Ted Fu (WongFu Productions), Megan Lee and Ryan Higa |
| Vol. 21 No. 10 | October 2010 | Throw Three Fingers Up for Far East Movement | Far East Movement |
| Vol. 21 No. 11 | November 2010 | Angry Asian Man | Phil Yu |
| Vol. 21 No. 12 | December 2010 | Jang Dong-gun Goes Hollywood | Jang Dong-gun |

=== 2011 ===
| Issue | Date | Cover Story | Cover Star |
|---|---|---|---|
| Vol. 22 No. 1 | January 2011 | Binna's Story | Binna Kim |
| Vol. 22 No. 2 | February 2011 | Supe Jane! | Jane Kim |
| Vol. 22 No. 3 | March 2011 | The Music Issue | Brian Joo |
| Vol. 22 No. 4 | April 2011 | Jamie Chung Goes Big-Budget Hollywood | Jamie Chung |
| Vol. 22 No. 5 | May 2011 | Angels Catcher Hank Conger Takes Flight | Hank Conger |
| Vol. 22 No. 6 | June 2011 | Funny Man Rising | Ken Jeong |
| Vol. 22 No. 7 | July 2011 | The Hines Factor | Hines Ward |
| Vol. 22 No. 8 | August 2011 | How Jennifer Yuh Nelson Became the Master of the Kung Fu Panda Universe | Jennifer Huh Nelson |
| Vol. 22 No. 9 | September 2011 | Tim Kang | Tim Kang |
| Vol. 22 No. 10 | October 2011 | Finding Her Voice | Dia Frampton |
| Vol. 22 No. 11 | November 2011 | Back for 3rds | John Cho and Kal Penn |
| Vol. 22 No. 12 | December 2011 | 2011, What a Difference a Year Makes | |

=== 2012 ===
| Issue | Date | Cover Story | Cover Star |
|---|---|---|---|
| Vol. 23 No. 1 | January 2012 | Jay Park | Jay Park |
| Vol. 23 No. 2 | February 2012 | Kogi Chef Roy Choi Shows You His Sunny Side | Roy Choi |
| Vol. 23 No. 3 | March 2012 | Say 'I Do' to...Wedding Palace | Bobby Lee, Brian Tee and Joy Osmanski |
| Vol. 23 No. 4 | April 2012 | 4.29 | |
| Vol. 23 No. 5 | May 2012 | Look Out! | Steve Byrne |
| Vol. 23 No. 6 | June 2012 | Eyes Wide Open | Chong Kim and Jamie Chung |
| Vol. 23 No. 7 | July 2012 | The Champ | Benson Henderson |
| Vol. 23 No. 8 | August 2012 | It Has Begun! | YOMYOMF |
| Vol. 23 No. 9 | September 2012 | Moon Beams | Moon Bloodgood |
| Vol. 23 No. 10 | October 2012 | The Smashing Steven Yeun | Steven Yeun |
| Vol. 23 No. 11 | November 2012 | The Boys of Seoul Sausage | Chris, Ted and Yong Kim |
| Vol. 23 No. 12 | December 2012 | PSY | PSY |

=== 2013 ===
| Issue | Date | Cover Star |
|---|---|---|
| Vol. 24 No. 1 | January 2013 | Lee Min-Ho |
| Vol. 24 No. 2 | February 2013 | Justin Chon |
| Vol. 24 No. 3 | March 2013 | Kim Yuna |
| Vol. 24 No. 4 | April 2013 | Daniel Henney |
| Vol. 24 No. 5 | May 2013 | Ailee |
| Vol. 24 No. 6 | June 2013 | TOKiMONSTA |
| Vol. 24 No. 7 | July 2013 | Will Yun Lee |
| Vol. 24 No. 8 | August 2013 | Hyun-jin Ryu |
| Vol. 24 No. 9 | September 2013 | Awkwafina |
| Vol. 24 No. 10 | October 2013 | Inbee Park |
| Vol. 24 No. 11 | November 2013 | Dan Matthews |
| Vol. 24 No. 12 | December 2013 | David Choi |

=== 2014 ===
| Issue | Date | Cover Star |
|---|---|---|
| Vol. 25 No. 1 | January 2014 | Tiger JK |
| Vol. 25 No. 2 | February 2014 | Arden Cho |
| Vol. 25 No. 3 | March 2014 | Run River North |
| Vol. 25 No. 4 | April 2014 | E.J. Ok |
| Vol. 25 No. 5 | May 2014 | Sandra Oh |
| Vol. 25 No. 6 | June 2014 | Sung Kang |
| Vol. 25 No. 7 | July 2014 | |
| Vol. 25 No. 8 | August/September 2014 | Shin-Soo Choo |
| Vol. 25 No. 9 | October/November 2014 | John Cho |
| Vol. 25 No. 10 | December 2014/January 2015 | Randall Park |

=== 2015 ===
| Issue | Date | Cover Star |
|---|---|---|
| Vol. 26 No. 1 | February/March 2015 | Benson Lee |
| Vol. 26 No. 2 | April/May 2015 | |
| Vol. 26 No. 3 | June/July 2015 | Kristen Kish |
| Vol. 26 No. 4 | August/September 2015 | Gennady Golovkin |
| Vol. 26 No. 5 | December 2015 | Margaret Cho and Ken Jeong |

== Accolades ==
=== 2000 ===
- Gay & Lesbian Alliance Against Defamation (GLAAD) Media Award nominee

=== 2002 ===
- Outstanding Service on Behalf of the Korean American community presented by the Korean American Bar Association of Southern California
- Annual Community Service Award presented by the Korean American Coalition San Francisco Bay Area Chapter

=== 2003 ===
- New California Media Awards: Arts/Culture.
- Pacific Asian Consortium in Employment (PACE) Setter Award

=== 2004 ===
- New California Media Awards: International; Youth Voice; Workplace Issues/Economy; Investigative/In-depth (runner-up); Arts, Sports & Entertainment (runner-up)

=== 2005 ===
- Society of Professional Journalists Mark of Excellence Awards, Region 5: Best Nonfiction Magazine Features.

=== 2008 ===
- Asian Pacific American Community Award by United States Assembly member Ted Lieu

=== 2009 ===
- National New America Media Award in the category of Best In-Depth and Investigative Reporting for Kai Ma's "To Have and to Hold", a feature on Proposition 8 and the Korean American vote
- National New America Media Honorable Mention in the category of Arts, Sports & Entertainment for Kai Ma's "High Rollers", a feature on high-stakes gambling.
- National New America Media Award in the category of Race and Interethnic Relations for Julie Ha's "Neighborhood Watch", a feature on the large numbers of Koreans moving into the Los Angeles neighborhood known as Little Tokyo, one of the last Japantowns left in California.

=== 2011 ===
- Korean Churches in Community Development (KCCD) Legacy Award

=== 2013 ===
- Leadership Education for Asian Pacifics (LEAP) Leadership Award
