= Yellow (1997 film) =

- DVD cover
- Directed by: Chris Chan Lee
- Written by: Chris Chan Lee
- Produced by: Chris Chan Lee; David Yang
- Starring: Soon-Tek Oh; Amy Hill; Michael Chung; Burt Bulos; Angie Suh; Mia Suh; Jason Tobin; Lela Lee; Mary Chen; John Cho
- Cinematography: Ted Cohen
- Edited by: Kenn Kashima
- Music by: Lance Hahn
- Production company: Defector Films
- Distributed by: Phaedra Cinema
- Release dates: March 8, 1997 (CAAMFest); May 29, 1998 (United States)
- Running time: 90 minutes
- Country: United States
- Languages: English; Korean
- Budget: $160,000

Yellow is an American 1997 comedy drama film directed by Chris Chan Lee. The film follows eight Korean–American youths in Los Angeles over the course of a wild night before their high school graduation. The film stars an ensemble cast including Michael Chung, John Cho, Burt Bulos, Jason Tobin, and Lela Lee. The film had its world premiere at the 15th CAAMFest (San Francisco International Asian American Film Festival) in San Francisco in 1997.

Yellow was invited to screen at a variety of film festivals, including the Los Angeles Film Festival, the Singapore International Film Festival and the Slamdance Film Festival. The film received U.S. distribution through Phaedra Cinema and was given a limited release on May 29, 1998.

== Plot ==
Eight friends in Los Angeles spend their last evening together as they face graduation from high school and the onset of their adult lives. Sin Lee can't join in on the fun because he has to work at his parents' grocery store. During Sin's shift, the store gets robbed at gunpoint and the thieves make off with $1,500. If Sin's parents find out what happened, Sin may end up having to stay behind to work at the store instead of heading off to college, so the friends set out to raise the missing money by sunrise any way they can—including scouring the city's streets, beaches, and bars and making a disastrous attempt to sell one relative's car. When it's clear that the scavenger hunt is not making progress, Sin gets desperate, and he and his friend Alex cross a line that may change their lives.

== Cast ==
- Michael Chung as Sin Lee
  - Derek Kwong as Young Sin Lee
- Burt Bulos as Alex
- John Cho as Joey
- Jason Tobin as Yo Yo
- Angie Suh as Grace
- Mia Suh as Teri
- Lela Lee as Janet
- Mary Chen as Mina
- Soon-Tek Oh as Woon Lee
- Amy Hill as "Snake" Ajima
- Charles Rahi Chun as Aaron
- Eric Steinberg as Peter
- Ray Chang as Mike
- Jasper Lee as Chaz
- Emily Kuroda as Mrs. Lee
- Sharon Omi as Mrs. Park
- Ken Narasaki as Grace's Dad

== Production ==
Writer-director Chris Chan Lee said the film is "about the juxtaposition of growing up in America and having immigrant parents so you've got a cultural gap as well as a generational gap. Even now, Asian kids are forced to identify with other subcultures because there isn't anything that directly reflects their experience." Lee said the film is semi-autobiographical, as his own parents, first-generation immigrants from Korea, ran a delicatessen in San Francisco.

When Lee and producer David Yang could not find studios interested in financing the film, they relied on seed money from family friends and Lee's credit cards. Yellow was shot in the L.A. neighborhoods of Redondo Beach, San Gabriel, and Koreatown for three weeks, beginning on July 15, 1996. In the midst of filming, a Japanese investor pledged his support. Lee said he was able to assemble the cast and crew through word-of-mouth within the Asian filmmaking community.

The film was soundtracked by Asian-American-led indie-rock bands.

The Center for Asian American Media (then known as the National Asian American Telecommunications Association) provided funding for the completion of the film, as well as an educational distribution deal to screen the film at universities.

== Release ==
The film premiered at San Francisco's CAAMFest on March 8, 1997. The film went on the show at the 1997 LA Film Festival, the 1998 Slamdance Film Festival, and the 1998 Singapore International Film Festival. Yellow was also the feature film at the sixth annual Seattle Asian American Film Festival.

In April 1998, arthouse distributor Phaedra Cinema acquired distribution rights for the film with a planned theatrical release for May. It was later released on DVD by Vanguard Cinema on January 3, 2001.

== Reception ==
In his article "Hawaii Fest Honors Films Of Pacific Rim" for the Chicago Sun-Times, film critic Roger Ebert wrote, "A different kind of culture shock was explored in Yellow, an American film by Chris Chan Lee, about the son of a strict Korean-American grocery owner in Los Angeles. The father enforces his standards so rigidly that he drives customers away. He alienates his son (Michael Daeho Chung), who during a long night with his Gen X Korean- American friends, deals with the consequences when a great deal of money is stolen from the store. The film is fascinating in the way it manages to be both about Korean-American society and about young Gen Xers who could be of any race."

In the Los Angeles Times, Kevin Thomas reviewed the film for its theatrical release in 1998. Thomas wrote, "As ambitious and rewarding as it is, Chris Chan Lee's Yellow has a significance beyond itself: It's the first major Korean American film to get a feature release. It's also a classic coming-of-age story, set during one long night just before eight high school friends are to graduate. You're tempted to describe the picture as 'Korean American Graffiti', but along with its humor it has an underlying disturbing seriousness." Thomas added, "Through the specificity of this Korean American experience you can easily feel a sense of universality in Sin's predicament. As a filmmaker Lee is at a point where he's stronger at dialogue than pacing. But there's no doubt Yellow marks the debut of a most promising talent who combines youthful zest and energy with a mature perspective that allows him to extend compassion to both sides of the generation gap."

Writing for The Austin Chronicle, Marc Savlov called the film "a bitingly dark comedy of escalating errors" and noted, "although Lee's script...sometimes ranges off into fields of preachiness, relentlessly good performances from Chung, Bulos, and especially Oh keep things grounded in the essential teen reality. Dazed and Confused it's not, but Yellow still manages to elicit nervous laughter from the planet of tortured teens." G. Allen Johnson of the San Francisco Examiner felt the character of Sin was underdeveloped, but praised Lee's visual style and said he "is skilled at depicting the emotions of those too old to be children and too young to be adults, that phase when anything seems possible but everything is frustrating."
