= Aimee Song =

American fashion blogger and fashion designer

- Born: 10 December 1986 (age 39); Los Angeles, California, U.S.
- Other name: Song of Style
- Occupations: Fashion influencer and designer; interior designer; author
- Years active: 2008–present
- Label: Amiya
- Website: amiya.com

Aimee Song (born December 10, 1986) is an American fashion blogger and fashion designer. She started blogging in 2008 while studying Interior Architecture in San Francisco, and created a blog called Song of Style. She is the creative director of her own fashion luxury collection Amiya, which is designed and made in Italy. Through the years Song has partnered, advised or created content with nearly all the major fashion and luxury companies in the world which gave her the opportunity to grow into a highly respected and sought after style icon. She is a constant attendee at New York and Paris Fashion Weeks and has collaborated with brands such as Dior, Louis Vuitton, Prada, Gucci, Valentino and Saint Laurent. She is also known for her beauty and skincare tips, and has partnered with some of the most exclusive brands in the industry such as Korean skincare brand Sulwhasoo. The Business of Fashion has constantly named her one of their BoF 500 people shaping the fashion industry since 2018. She was on Forbes' 30 Under 30 list in 2016 and her book Capture Your Style was on The New York Times best-seller list. Her second book Aimee Song: World of Style was published in 2018. She collaborated with the furniture label Lulu & Georgia in 2025.

== Amiya ==
Aimee Song co-founded the brand Amiya in 2025 with her partner, Italian photographer Jacopo Moschin.

== Books ==
- Capture Your Style (2016) ISBN 9781419722158
- World Of Style (2018) ISBN 9781419733369
