= East Coast Asian American Student Union =

U.S. nonprofit organization

- Abbreviation: ECAASU
- Formation: 1977; 49 years ago
- Type: 501(c)(3) intercollegiate student organization
- Purpose: Asian-Pacific American advocacy
- Headquarters: Connecticut
- Region served: Eastern United States
- Website: www.ecaasu.org
- Formerly called: Intercollegiate Liaison Committee (ICLC) (1977–1978); East Coast Asian Student Union (ECASU) (1978–2004); East Coast Asian American Student Union (ECAASU) (2004–2008)

The East Coast Asian American Student Union (ECAASU) is a 501(c)(3) nonprofit organization that promotes awareness of Asian and Pacific Islander social issues. Run by volunteers, ECAASU's advocacy work focuses on outreach to AAPI student organizations across the United States and by educating individuals through various programs throughout the year. ECAASU hosts an annual conference for Asian American students. The organization's membership is primarily composed of universities from the Eastern United States, while its annual conferences draw students and activists from throughout the United States.

ECAASU was originally established in 1978 as the East Coast Asian Student Union (ECASU) before changing its name at a 2005 conference. It currently attracts over 1,500 students to its annual conference. The ECAASU conference held at the University of Pennsylvania (March 4–6, 2010) was attended by almost 1,700 students. Likewise, the 2013 ECAASU conference held at Columbia University drew in over 1,500 students from over 200 different colleges.

== History ==
=== Background ===
In the 1960s, Asian American students organized rallies, sit-ins, and campus takeovers in San Francisco, California, and in other parts of the country that called for universities to improve access to higher education for these students. These efforts coincided with Asian Americans entering universities and colleges in significant numbers. Ethnic studies and other supportive programs were established to include Asian Americans.

During the 1970s, Asian American student organizations were established to deal with their specific needs and concerns. The first was the Yale University Asian American Students Association (Yale AASA), which was established in 1969. Its members persuaded Yale to recruit more Asian American students, organized campaigns to repeal Title II of the 1950 McCarran Act, and developed the first Asian American Studies course on the East Coast during the Spring semester of 1970.

The first East Coast Asian American student conference, "Asians in America," took place at Yale in April 1970. Over 300 students from over 40 different colleges attended. Members of Yale AASA, led by editor Lowell Chun-Hoon and publisher Don Nakanishi, of Yale's Class of 1971, founded Amerasia Journal, the first academic journal for the field of Asian American Studies.

=== 1977–1978: Establishment as Intercollegiate Liaison Committee and East Coast Asian Student Union ===
==== Impact of the Bakke decision ====
In 1978, the Supreme Court upheld Allan Bakke's claim that he had not been admitted to UC Davis medical school due to "reverse discrimination". This sparked a student-led struggle against this decision. This led to the founding of the West Coast Asian Pacific Student Union (APSU), the Midwest Asian Pacific American Student Organization network, and ECASU, with regions in the Mid-Atlantic and New England.

=== 2004–2008: Establishment as East Coast Asian American Student Union & ECAASU, Inc. ===
In addition, ECAASU began to apply for non-profit status and created new boards, including the Board of Directors (aka Directorate) and the ECAASU Representatives Council (which included about). The National Board has also taken steps to create ECAASU events outside of the yearly conference, including regional fall mixers. Lastly, the National Board has revived the ECAASU journal, formerly known as Asian American Spirit, now titled Envision.

Following ECAASU's 2007 Conference at Yale, the council experienced a period of revival, growing from 2 to 12 people and occupying 10 board positions. In 2008, ECAASU became ECAASU, Inc. as it became an 501(c)(3) organization. The council was then reestablished as the National Board, boasting around 60 members from over 40 schools.

=== 2008–present: Continued success and reformation of board ===
==== COVID-19 ====
In 2021, in-person attendance for the conference was halted due to the COVID-19 pandemic, following the end of 2020. The conference was moved virtually for both 2021 and 2022, resuming in-person activities in 2023.

== Programs ==
ECAASU offers three major programs, which allows participants to receive a discounted registration fee to the annual conference.

- High School Program: The virtual program is an initiative offered by the organization that aims to educate high school students across the country on Asian American issues. Its three core themes are identity & self, political activism & community organizing, and social movements & history. The program hosts workshops online, bringing projects and discussions over Zoom.
- Campus Summits: Aimed at those in higher education, Campus Summits offers a similar program to the High School Program but to undergraduate and graduate students alike. Originally known as Campus Tours, the summits are essentially mini-conferences that are hosted locally at the organizer's campus and/or community, where they primarily educate students, faculty, and staff about AAPI issues.
- Artist in Residence: Established in 2020, the Artist in Residence program's mission is to "uplift and foster community between emerging Asian American (A/A) artists of all mediums." Offering meetings, guest mentors, craft workshops, and discussion workshops, AiR also focuses on uplifting selected artists by sharing their portfolios through ECAASU’s network, housing portfolios on ECAASU’s existing platforms, supporting artists in publishing opportunities including the ECAASU Journal, and providing a final exposition at ECAASU’s annual national conference.
- ECAASU Journal: A recent publication, ECAASU Journal made its inaugural issue post-2025 Conference. An academic and artistic journal, the journal offers five major categories of works, ranging from creative writing, essays, poetry, photography/film, and visual art, with submissions from over 10 different artists.

== Past conferences ==
ECAASU hosts annual conferences around the East Coast, spearheaded by three major boards: the National Board, the Board of Directors, and the Conference Team. At the end of each conference, a group of students (usually those in an Asian American student organization) submits a bid proposal to the conference director in order to bring the conference to their campus, in which those will become part of the annual (External) Conference Team.

A thematic statement offers centralized tenants to the conferences' workshops, exploring the nuances of the Asian American identity. Workshops are hosted by the National Board, offering plenaries and roundtables.

A conference also holds a keynote speaker during the opening ceremony. Recent keynote speakers included author R.F. Kuang and chef Edward Lee, at the 2024 and 2025 Conference respectively.

List of ECAASU conferences by year, location, and theme
| Year | Date | School(s) | City | Theme | Ref. |
|---|---|---|---|---|---|
| 1977 | | Yale University | New Haven, Connecticut | | |
| 1978 | | Princeton University | Princeton, New Jersey | Asian Student Unity | |
| 1979 | | University of Massachusetts Amherst | Amherst, Massachusetts | Learning From the Past to Build Up to the Future | |
| 1980 | | Harvard University | Cambridge, Massachusetts | Asian Students Organizing for the 80's | |
| 1981 | | Mount Holyoke College | South Hadley, Massachusetts | Asian Women, Myth and Reality | |
| 1982 | | Harvard University | Cambridge, Massachusetts | Rising to the Challenge | |
| 1983 | | Columbia University | New York City, New York | Asian Students in Action | |
| 1984 | | Brown University | Providence, Rhode Island | Asian Americans and the American Dream | |
| 1985 | | Smith College | Northampton, Massachusetts | Visions of Asians in America: Aspiration & Responsibilities | |
| 1986 | | Princeton University | Princeton, New Jersey | Asian Students: New Directions...Beyond the Model Minority | |
| 1987 | | Boston University | Boston, Massachusetts | Education in Action | |
| 1988 | | Cornell University | Ithaca, New York | Momentum for Change: 10 Years of ECASU | |
| 1989 | | Hunter College | New York City, New York | Asian Empowerment through Unity: A Challenging Future | |
| 1990 | | University of Massachusetts Ahmerst; Smith College; Mount Holyoke College; Hampshire College; Amherst College | Northampton, Massachusetts | The 1990 Census and Beyond: A Map for Asian American Impact in the United States | |
| 1991 | | Binghamton University | Vestal, New York | Speak Up, Speak Out: End of Marginalization | |
| 1992 | | Harvard University | Cambridge, Massachusetts | Changing Faces of Asian American Community | |
| 1993 | | University of Pennsylvania | Philadelphia, Pennsylvania | Lights, Camera, Action | |
| 1994 | | Yale University | New Haven, Connecticut | APAs in the Arts and Media | |
| 1995 | | Duke University | Durham, North Carolina | Exposing the Plight of Asian Pacific Americans in our Nation's Inner Cities | |
| 1996 | | University of Maryland, College Park | College Park, Maryland | Building Bridges to our Future | |
| 1997 | | University at Albany, SUNY | Albany, New York | Where Do Asian Americans Fit in the Black and White Paradigm | |
| 1998 | | Cornell University | Ithaca, New York | Leading the Way to the 21st Century | |
| 1999 | | Brown University | Providence, Rhode Island | Coming Together: A Pan-Asian Pacific American Movement into the Next Millennium | |
| 2000 | | Yale University | New Haven, Connecticut | Stepping Forward: identity, unity, action | |
| 2001 | | Columbia University | New York City, New York | Evolution! | |
| 2002 | | Duke University | Durham, North Carolina | Strangers in America | |
| 2003 | | Georgetown University | Washington, D.C. | New Horizons | |
| 2004 | | University of Virginia | Charlottesville, Virginia | Awakening | |
| 2005 | | University of Pennsylvania | Philadelphia, Pennsylvania | Impact: Our Own Making | |
| 2006 | | George Washington University | Washington, D.C. | Foundations: Deep Roots, Lasting Growth | |
| 2007 | | Yale University | New Haven, Connecticut | Breaking Through | |
| 2008 | | Cornell University | Ithaca, New York | Push Forward | |
| 2009 | | Rutgers University | New Brunswick–Piscataway, New Jersey | Distinct Worlds, One Vision | |
| 2010 | | University of Pennsylvania | Philadelphia, Pennsylvania | Behind These Eyes: Impression. Introspection. Innovation | |
| 2011 | | University of Massachusetts Amherst | Amherst, Massachusetts | B.R.E.A.K: Bridge, Revitalize, Equality, Action, Knowledge | |
| 2012 | | Duke University | Durham, North Carolina | Rediscovery. Renaissance. Revolution. | |
| 2013 | | Columbia University | New York City, New York | Within. Across. Beyond. | |
| 2014 | | Washington, D.C. (Georgetown University, George Washington University, American University and University of Maryland, College Park) | Washington, D.C. Metropolitan Area | Mission IGNITION: Champion Your Cause | |
| 2015 | | Harvard University | Cambridge, Massachusetts | New Asian American | |
| 2016 | | Rutgers University | New Brunswick–Piscataway, New Jersey | Beyond Our Boundaries | |
| 2017 | | North Carolina Triangle (University of North Carolina at Chapel Hill, Duke University, and North Carolina State University) | Raleigh, North Carolina | Atmosphere | |
| 2018 | | Cornell University | Ithaca, New York | Continuum: Power Through Perspective | |
| 2019 | | University of Central Florida; University of Florida; Florida State University; Florida Atlantic University; University of South Florida; University of Miami | Orlando, Florida | Introspection | |
| 2020 | | Carnegie Mellon University; University of Pittsburgh | Pittsburgh, Pennsylvania | Building Bridges | |
| 2021 | | Montclair State University; Stockton University | —N/a | Resilience | |
| 2022 | April 8–10, 2025 | Boston University; Massachusetts Institute of Technology | Boston, Massachusetts | Turning the Tides | |
| 2023 | April 14–16, 2025 | University of Virginia | Charlottesville, Virginia | Reconnection and Reflection | |
| 2024 | March 1–3, 2024 | Yale University | New Haven, Connecticut | Resistance in Joy | |
| 2025 | April 11–13, 2025 | Washington, D.C. | | Bloom | |
| 2026 | March 27–29, 2026 | Duke University | Durham, North Carolina | Currents | |

== Bibliography ==
- Takanagi, Dana Y (1992). The Retreat from Race: Asian-American Admissions and Racial Politics. Rutgers University Press. ISBN 0-8135-1914-4.
- Vellela, Tony (1988). New Voices: Student Activism in the '80s and '90s. South End Press. pp. 113–116. ISBN 0-89608-341-1.
- Wei, William (1994). The Asian American Movement. Temple University Press. ISBN 1-56639-183-0.
