= Angry Asian Man =

Internet blog run by Phil Yu

- Website type: Blog
- Owner: Phil Yu
- Creator: Phil Yu
- Website: blog.angryasianman.com
- Launched: 2001; 25 years ago
- Current status: Active

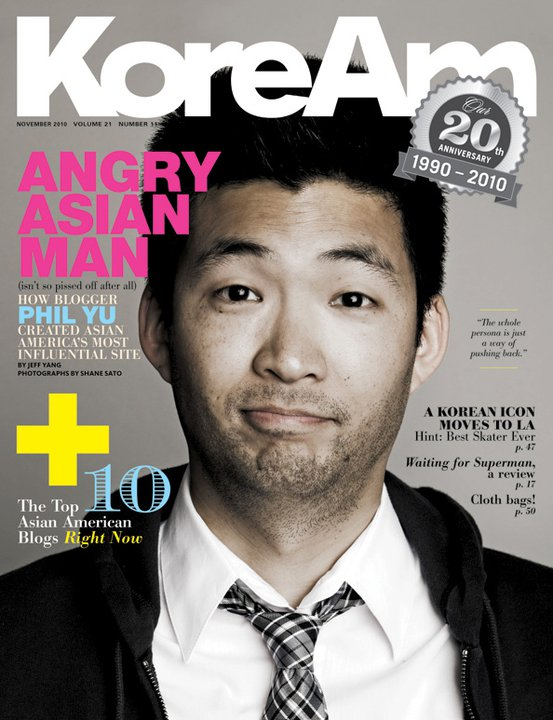
Founder Phil Yu on the cover of KoreAm November 2010

Angry Asian Man is an Internet blog founded in 2001 by Phil Yu. It focuses on Asian American news, media, and politics.

== Origins ==
Yu first began blogging with a personal website www.minsoolove.com in 2000. In April 2002, he registered the URL www.angryasianman.com.

An accompanying podcast, Sound and Fury: The Angry Asian Podcast, was launched in May 2012 and features interviews with Asian Americans.

== Recognition ==
The Washington Post calls Angry Asian Man "a daily must-read for the media-savvy, socially conscious, pop-cultured Asian American."
