= Phaedra Cinema =

- Industry: Film distribution
- Founded: 1996
- Founder: Gregory Hatanaka
- Defunct: 2001
- Headquarters: United States

Phaedra Cinema was a United States distributor of independent and international films. The company was created by filmmaker Gregory Hatanaka in 1996 and its first release was the comedy Sudden Manhattan, directed by and starring Adrienne Shelley.

Phaedra Cinema's most notable releases included Fever Pitch starring Colin Firth, La Separation starring Isabelle Huppert, a restored edition of Jimmy Wang Yu's 1975 Master of the Flying Guillotine, and two Nikkatsu Roman porno films, Masaru Konuma's Wife to be Sacrificed (1974) and Noboru Tanaka's A Woman Called Sada Abe (1975), on a theatrical double-bill. The company went out of business in 2001.
