= Intercollegiate Taiwanese American Students Association =

Taiwanese and American students association

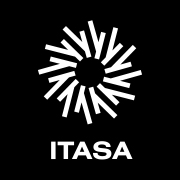
- ITASA Logo
- Formation: February 17, 1998
- Type: NGO
- Legal status: 501(c)(3) religious/cultural
- Purpose: Community activism
- Headquarters: Evanston, Illinois
- Location: Evanston, Illinois
- Region served: East, West, Midwest
- Members: 1000+
- Official language: English
- Main organ: National Board, Board of Directors
- Affiliations: Taiwanese American Student Associations, Official Partner of Taiwanese American Citizens League
- Staff: 40+
- Website: ITASA.org

The Intercollegiate Taiwanese American Students Association (ITASA) (Chinese (Traditional): 美國台裔學生協會) was established by a group of students in the East Coast and Midwest of the United States to grow the Taiwanese American college community. ITASA is a national 501(c)(3) non-profit organization staffed by students and recent graduates to serve their peers and their respective campuses. ITASA provides the spaces for networking, community building, leadership training, and identity-building which are critical to the future of the Taiwanese American generation.

== History ==
The Intercollegiate Taiwanese American Students Association was established in 1985. Students from East Coast and Midwest colleges formed the group. The group's members are second-generation Taiwanese Americans. ITASA is based in Illinois. It has 15 branches and roughly 1,000 members from over 100 colleges and universities.

On July 4, 1990, a group of second generation Taiwanese Americans converged on the campuses of Cornell University as a part of the Taiwanese American Conference/East Coast (TAC/EC) at Donlon Lounge to commence discussions regarding an intercollegiate Taiwanese Council. During the 1991 meeting, about twenty representatives from schools like Harvard, Columbia, Yale, University of Pennsylvania, Smith, Rutgers, and NYU converged on the campuses of Columbia University for three days.

The first ITASA East Coast Conference took place at the University of Pennsylvania in 1992 (ITSA), followed by Yale University in 1993. The first Midwest ITASA conference took place the same year at Purdue University. From then on, ITASA held two conferences annually on the East Coast and the Midwest, until 1999, when the first annual West Coast Conference was held at the University of California, Berkeley, thus completing the three-region conference series which continues today.

In the beginning, ITASA conferences were self-financed and catered by students' own families. Attendance ranged from 35 to 300 people.

On February 17, 1998, ITASA was formally incorporated as a 501(c)(3) religious/cultural tax-exempt nonprofit corporation in Delaware by Incorporator Kok-ui Lim with the help of many other people, including Jimmy Ho, Audrey Jean, Cathy Hsu, Tim Chng, Rolla Chng, et al.

The founders of ITASA presided for several years and had tried several ways to generate successors. They created a steering committee of positions including the quaintly termed "Computer Operator" and recruited interested students from schools all over the nation to help run the organization. Many members of the steering committee have noted that they lacked the experience and motivation to run a geographically dispersed student organization. Staff experience increased with the command of Jimmy, Audrey, Cathy, and others. This new generation of ITASA leaders, all recent conference directors on the East Coast, helped to secure ITASA's financial and organizational future by facilitating the incorporation of ITASA into a 501(c)(3) corporation and investing ITASA's involvement on the regional level. They also developed ITASA's nascent web presence, centralized fundraising strategies, and brought greater structure to the national calendar of events and board responsibilities. From then on, the Board of Directors emerged from a group of veteran officers and new officers emerged from the conference leaders. Today, the ITASA National Board is selected every June from a pool of applicants from across the United States.

In 1998, Taiwanese American students at Harvard University, the Massachusetts Institute of Technology, and Tufts University established the Boston Intercollegiate Taiwanese Students Association (BITSA) to serve the many campuses in the Boston area.

In 1999, the first Annual Leadership Retreat was held at the University of Pennsylvania.

In the spring of 1999, students at the University of California at Berkeley undertook the first West Coast Conference, bringing ITASA to three major regions across the United States.

== Approach ==
While setting goals, the National Board has identified 5 levels of student activism. The community at large needed more resources to educate, unite, and equip the general body of Taiwanese Americans across the United States. The campuses at each school needed support in getting linked to the nationwide network and founding new chapters of Taiwanese American student groups. The individual students required more information, ideas, contacts, outlets, and guidelines for personal and collective activism.

== Programs ==
=== ITASA Grants ===
ITASA Grants was started during the 2018–2019 Academic Year following various inquiries about whether ITASA can help fund chapter events. The program comes as a combination of the previous Regional Grants Initiative and the ITASA Awards program. For the Spring 2019 Academic Term, ITASA helped to fund 3 different events at the University of Chicago, University of Texas at Austin, and Binghamton University for a grand total of $1,000.
