= Audrey (magazine) =

American magazine

- Editor: Anna M. Park
- Categories: Asian American, Fashion, Beauty
- Frequency: Bi-monthly
- Circulation: 10,000
- Founded: 2003
- First issue: March 2003
- Final issue: December 2015 (print)
- Company: London Media Trust
- Country: USA
- Based in: Gardena, California
- Language: English
- Website: audreymagazine.com

Audrey Magazine, or also known as Audrey, was a publication focusing on Asian American women, published quarterly throughout the U.S.

== History ==
The first issue of the magazine hit newsstands in March 2003. The magazine was named after the publisher's daughter to acknowledge that many Asian American women have English names.

Audrey covered Asians and Asian Americans in popular culture, fashion and beauty trends, lifestyle and travel, as well as social and cultural issues relevant to Asians and Asian Americans. Its sister publication was KoreAm. In its 10-year history, Audrey has been an important voice, covering stories well before the mainstream media picks them up, whether it is Asian plastic surgery, an emerging Asian American talent, or the K-pop craze. The magazine has featured Asian and Asian American celebrities on its cover, including Freida Pinto, Maggie Q and Olivia Munn. The magazine is based in Gardena, California.

In 2006, Audrey also began to host the Audrey Fashion Show to feature Asian American fashion designers, models and artists.

Audrey and its sister publication KoreAm were acquired by London Media Trust in 2014. The last print issues of the magazine and KoreAm were published in December 2015.

In 2019, Audrey's sister publication KoreAm rebranded to Character Media, covering the latest in Asian American culture, entertainment and news.

An archive of the previously published issues was created on the Character Media website.

== Publication history ==
=== 2003 ===
Issue	Date	Cover
Vol. 1 No. 1	March/April 2003	Tamlyn Tomita
Vol. 1 No. 2	May/June 2003	Ming-Na Wen
Vol. 1 No. 3	August/September 2003	Sandra Oh
Vol. 1 No. 4	October/November 2003	Yuan Yaun Tan
Vol. 1 No. 5	December 2003/January 2004	Wen Yann Shih

=== 2004 ===
Issue	Date	Cover
Vol. 2 No. 1	February/March 2004	SuChin Pak
Vol. 2 No. 2	April/May 2004	Lisa Ling
Vol. 2 No. 3	June/July 2004	Bai Ling
Vol. 2 No. 4	August/September 2004	Tiffany Limos
Vol. 2 No. 5	October/November 2004	Audrey Quock
Vol. 2 no. 6	December 2004/January 2005	Jessica Yu

=== 2005 ===
Issue	Date	Cover
Vol. 3 No. 1	February/March 2005	Lea Salonga
Vol. 3 No. 2	April/May 2005	Rosalyn Patamakanthin
Vol. 3 No. 3	June/July 2005	Joan Chen
Vol. 3 No. 4	August/September 2005	Noureen DeWulf and Navi Rawat
Vol. 3 No. 5	October/November 2005	Michelle Krusiec
Vol. 3 No. 6	December 2005/January 2006	Gong Li

=== 2006 ===
Issue	Date	Cover
Vol. 4 No. 1	February/March 2006	Sheetal Sheth
Vol. 4 No. 2	April/May 2006	Vivian Wu
Vol. 4 No. 3	June/July 2006	Maggie Q
Vol. 4 No. 4	August/September 2006	Grace Park
Vol. 4 No. 5	October/November 2006	Rinko Kikuchi
Vol. 4 No. 6	December 2006/January 2007	Kelly Hu

=== 2007 ===
Issue	Date	Cover
Vol. 5 No. 1	February/March 2007	Tabu
Vol. 5 No. 2	April/May 2007	Elaine Quijano
Vol. 5 No. 3	June/July 2007	Melissa Reyes
Vol. 5 No. 4	August/September 2007	Sharon Leal
Vol. 5 No. 5	October/November 2007	Tang Wei
Vol. 5 No. 6	December 2007/January 2008	Lindsay Price

=== 2008 ===
Issue	Date	Cover
Vol. 6 No. 1	February/March 2008	Jenny Shimizu
Vol. 6 No. 2	April/May 2008	Isabelle Du
Vol. 6 No. 3	June/July 2008	Tia Carrere
Vol. 6 No. 4	August/September 2008	Priscilla Ahn
Vol. 6 No. 5	October/November 2008	Margaret Cho
Vol. 6 No. 6	December 2008/January 2008	Jamie Chung

=== 2009 ===
Issue	Date	Cover
Vol. 7 No. 1	February/March 2009	Freida Pinto
Vol. 7 No. 2	April/May 2009	
Vol. 7 No. 3	Summer 2009	
Vol. 7 No. 4	Fall 2009	

=== 2010 ===
Issue	Date
Vol. 8 No. 1	Spring 2010
Vol. 8 No. 2	Summer 2010
Vol. 8 No. 3	Fall 2010
Vol. 8 No. 4	Winter 2010/2011

=== 2011 ===
Issue	Date	Cover
Vol. 9 No. 1	Spring 2011	Olivia Munn
Vol. 9 No. 2	Summer 2011	Li Bing Bing
Vol. 9 No. 3	Fall 2011	Jenna Ushkowitz
Vol. 1 No. 4	Winter 2011/2012	Mindy Kaling

=== 2012 ===
Issue	Date	Cover
Vol. 10 No. 1	Spring 2012	Hannah Simone
Vol. 10 No. 2	Summer 2012	
Vol. 10 No. 3	Fall 2012	Jamie Chung
Vol. 10 No. 4	Winter 2012/2013	Maggie Q

=== 2013 ===
Issue	Date	Cover
Vol. 11 No. 1	Spring 2013	Elodie Yung
Vol. 11 No. 2	Summer 2013	Rinko Kikuchi
Vol. 11 No. 3	Fall 2013	Kristin Kreuk
Vol. 11 No. 4	Winter 2013/2014	Priyanka Chopra

=== 2014 ===
Issue	Date	Cover
Vol. 12 No. 1	Spring 2014	Yuna
Vol. 12 No. 2	Summer 2014	Sandra Oh
Vol. 12 No. 3	Fall 2014	Eva Chen
Vol. 12 No. 4	Winter 2014/2015	Michelle Phan

=== 2015 ===
Issue	Date	Cover
Vol. 13 No. 1	Spring 2015	Lucy Liu
Vol. 13 No. 2	Summer 2015	Aimee Song
Vol. 13 No. 3	Fall 2015	Constance Wu
Vol. 13 No. 4	Winter 2015	Jeannie Mai

== See also ==
KoreAm Journal
