= Angry Little Asian Girl =

American animated series by Lela Lee

- Angry Little Asian Girl, Five Angry Episodes DVD cover.
- Genre: Animation
- Written by: Tom Huang, Lela Lee, Greg Pace
- Directed by: Yorico Murakami, Douglas Rowell, Walter Santucci
- Voices of: Lela Lee, Margaret Cho, Scott Menville
- No. of seasons: 1
- No. of episodes: 12

Production
- Executive producers: Jennifer Choi, Lela Lee, L. Mark Medernach, Douglas Rowell, Nicole White
- Animators: George Chung, Layron DeJarnette, Cesar Henriquez, Kelly Kanemaru, April Lee
- Production company: Duck Studios

Original release
- Network: Mnet

Angry Little Asian Girl is an American animated cartoon created by Lela Lee. Lee created an initial series of animations in the late 1990s, and worked with the Asian American channel Mnet for a 12-episode season released in 2014. The series focuses on Kim, a grade-school Korean American who unleashes her anger on injustices.

== Origin ==
Most sources say that Lee started creating Angry Little Asian Girl after being disgusted by a film festival. When Lee was a student at the University of California, Berkeley in 1994, she attended Spike and Mike's Sick and Twisted Festival of Animation. She walked out mad at a series of ethnic jabs and drew her own animations that night, using Crayola markers and then video-editing equipment at school to complete her first episode. She initially did not show her animation to anyone, thinking it was too angry and that it made her embarrassed. Four years later she showed it to some friends who said the character was a great heroine and stood against Asian stereotypes. From this she developed the animated series.

However, a Los Angeles Times article gives a different origin story: stress from family pressure and studies led to drawing as an escape, then later a friend encouraged her to compile the drawings into a short video. While this video was put away for some years, boredom while working at her family's dry-cleaning business made her return to the project.

== Premise and initial episodes ==
The main character of the animations is Kim, an "aggressive, foul-mouthed and generally sociopathic character". Kim is based on Lee; PBS said it is "clear that Lee is Kim's real-life alter ego." Lee said that "You didn't get angry in our house. If you got angry, you were a bad child. The cartoon is my therapy." Each episode was based on Lela Lee's experiences growing up in an predominately white neighborhood.

In April 1998 four or five episodes of the animation were screened at the American Cinematheque. Kevin Thomas, reviewing for the Los Angeles Times, called Angry Little Asian Girl "scabrously funny", saying "Lee is a minimalist, using simple Magic Marker drawings, but boy does she have plenty to say. Her diminutive grade-school-age heroine unleashes a torrent of foul language whenever she's offended--and this happens a lot--by any behavior that strikes her as racist or discriminatory (or male chauvinist). Her unleashed rage is at once hilarious--so much tough talk from such a little girl--and therapeutic... Lee leaves you suspecting that Lee's feisty heroine is saying out loud what a lot of Asian Americans... are often feeling but not saying." It also received a glowing review from the LA Weekly, who said it offered "bold dialogue on subjects often kept unspoken."

Also in 1998, Lee launched a website for the animated series and started selling merchandise, which now covers an extensive range of products. She had launched a spin-off comic strip by 2000 called Angry Little Girls, which as of 2024 she is still updating.

A collection of the animations was published as "Angry Little Asian Girl: Five Angry Episodes". They are also available through one of Lee's websites.

== TV adaptation ==
Once the works and merchandise began to be successful, Lee sought to make a full TV version, but met resistance from executives. Some said that the proposed show seemed too racially charged. Others said Asians were not a strong consumer market. MTV asked for a VHS copy of "Angry Little Asian Girl, Five Angry Episodes", but an MTV executive told Lee that "there's no market for Asians." Lee said that she "waited until someone came along who understands what we're trying to do — trying to say".

Eventually, she signed a deal with Mnet, an Asian American channel, for two seasons of "Angry Little Asian Girl". It was first announced for "fall 2012", then later for June 2013. Later in 2013, it was reported that negotiations between Mnet and Lee were going poorly, with Lee posting on Facebook that “You cannot negotiate with people who say what’s mine is mine and what’s yours is negotiable" and "For too many months, I’ve been dragged through some nasty negotiations."

On 25 December 2014, a 12-episode version of Angry Little Asian Girl was released, with Mnet broadcasting all 12 episodes in a three-hour block. Lela Lee played Kim and Margaret Cho played her mother.

== Creator ==
Lela Lee is a Korean American and the youngest of four girls. She is an actor who was a main character on the TV series Tremors and who appeared in shows such as Friends, Scrubs, and Charmed. As of 2015 she was living in Los Angeles.

== See also ==
Angry Little Girls: The webcomic version of the same setting
