= Jae Jin =

American singer-songwriter

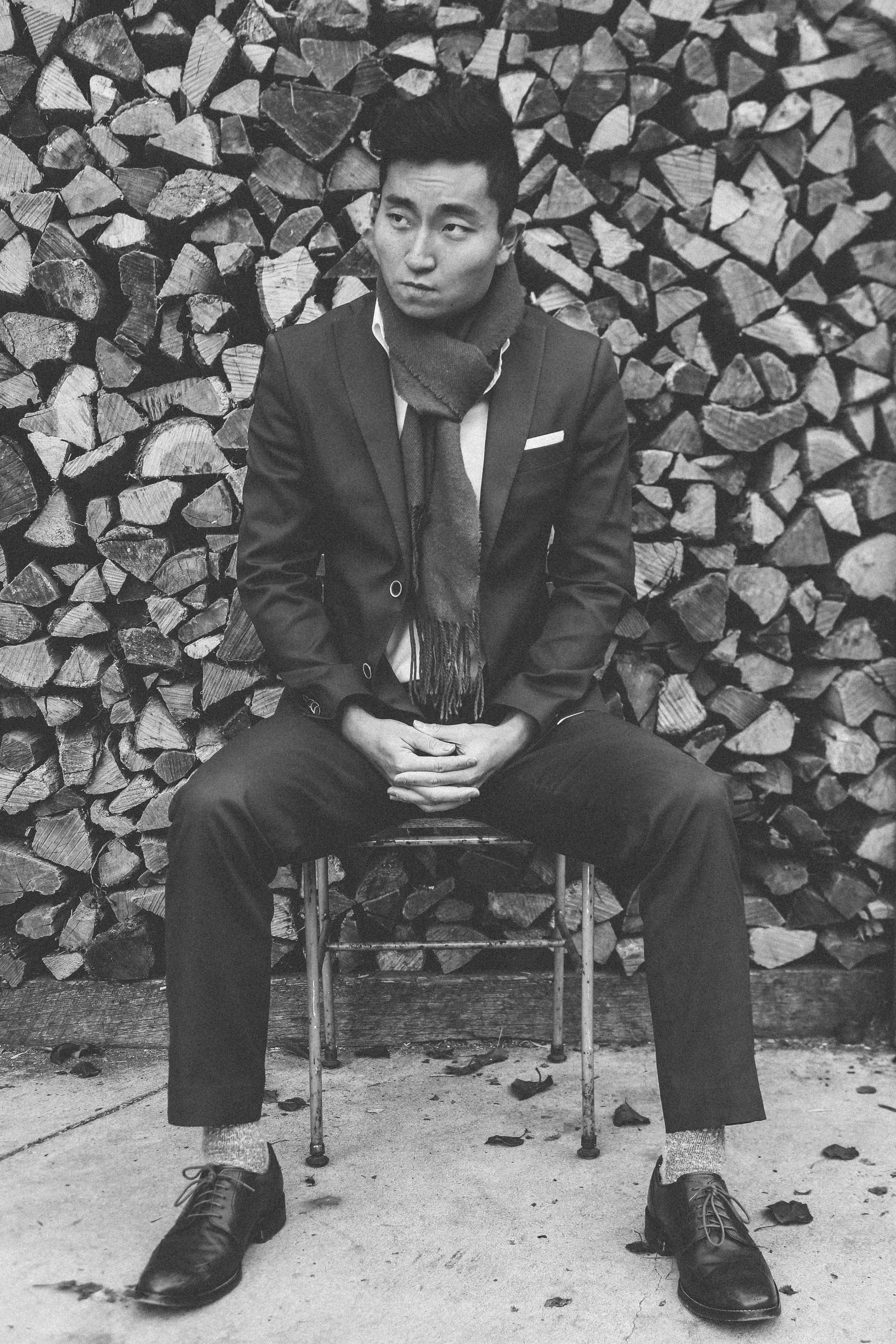
- Jae Jin

Background information
- Born: Seoul, South Korea
- Genres: pop; acoustic; soul; contemporary Christian; gospel; R&B
- Occupations: Musician, Singer-songwriter, speaker
- Instruments: Vocals; guitar; piano; keyboards
- Years active: 2015–present
- Labels: Independent; Unsigned
- Website: Jae Jin Official Site

Korean name
- Hangul: 재진
- RR: Jae Jin
- MR: Chae Chin

Jae Jin (born in Seoul, South Korea) is an American musician, singer-songwriter, SAG-AFTRA actor and public speaker. He independently distributes his original music through AWAL (under Kobalt Music Group) and was a part of the Sinasoid Artist Guild.

To date, Jin has independently self-released five albums: Kairos (2015), Baltimore Boulevard (2017), Letters and Drinks (2018), The Seasons In Between (2022), and 'Praying With Eyes Open' (2026). Jin won a John Lennon Songwriting Award in 2019 and also received first place in the International Songwriting Competition. He was also a finalist in the 2019 NewSong Music Competition. Jin has appeared on Season 16 of U.S. TV series The Voice and on Season 2 of U.S. TV series House of Cards as a principal actor. He received a WeWork Creator Award through WeWork in 2018 for his original music and life story, and gave his first TEDx talk in 2020.

== Biography ==
Jin was born in Seoul, South Korea on November 6 and immigrated to the United States with his mother when he was two years old. He attended Chantilly High School. Having spent over 20 years in Baltimore, Maryland, he considers Baltimore a hometown of sorts. He has a Korean mother, Mihye, and a Caucasian stepfather, John Whiteside, who he considers his real father and wrote his original song 'Father's Land' about.

At the age of 17, Jin was diagnosed with a terminal blood-bone marrow disorder. He underwent experimental chemotherapy at Johns Hopkins Hospital. Five years later, while he was a pre-med student at Johns Hopkins University, the illness returned, and Jin repeated the same chemotherapy, becoming the second patient in history to receive the treatment twice.

He graduated from Johns Hopkins University, went on to partially complete an MPH degree from Johns Hopkins Bloomberg School of Public Health and spent many years working in healthcare management at the Johns Hopkins Medical Institute, social enterprise and workforce development in East Baltimore (Baltimore), as well as time spent in the startup world. As Jin was preparing to commence a dual graduate degree in Medicine and Business (MD/MBA program), he chose instead to pursue a career in music at the end of 2014.

== Career ==
=== 2013–2014: Early career ===
Jin made his first notable appearance in 2013, when his cover of Sam Cooke's song "Nothing Can Change This Love" was shared by video blog WorldStarHipHop going viral. After garnering over one million views, the video was removed from the service at the request of Sam Cooke's music publishers. Following the popularization of this video, Jin began meeting with record labels, music business executives, and major network reality television shows even garnering the attention of Russell Simmons. However, instead of partnering with a third-party, the musician decided to pursue his music career independently.

A few months later, Jin appeared as a principal actor singing in a scene on U.S. TV series House of Cards.

In 2014, Jin appeared on Christian radio network Moody Radio for an interview on the Chris Fabry Live program discussing his plans to take a leap of faith with limited musical experience.

=== 2015–2016: Kairos ===
Jin began his journey by packing up his entire life into two suitcases moving to New York City. Jin spent three months recording his debut album, titled Kairos, with the help of his long time friend and the album's producer, Tim Ouyang of Tim Be Told. On October 6, 2015, Jin released his ten track debut studio album, Kairos.

Jin appeared on ABC News numerous times for interviews and guest performances of "Wild Creatures" and "Ain't About Love".

On August 28, 2020, Jin released a 31-track Kairos Super Deluxe album consisting of the original 10 songs as well as 21 bonus tracks that included live acoustic versions, a handful of special alternative versions, and instrumentals. The super deluxe also includes an in-depth commentary with album producer, Tim, as well as a special final track which includes Korean translation lyrics of "Amen" spoken by Jin's own birth mother.

=== 2017: Baltimore Boulevard ===
On November 3, 2017, Jin released his sophomore effort Baltimore Boulevard, an album collection of songs written over a two-year span. In the same month, he was awarded a WeWork Creator Award given to those who "bring new ideas into the world". Jin was also invited to share his life story on stage at Madison Square Garden during the WeWork Global Summit.

=== 2018–2019: Letters & Drinks ===
On June 29, 2018, Jin released his third full-length album, Letters & Drinks. Atwood Magazine's Mitch Mosk wrote: "echoing the likes of Fun and Jason Mraz, and with a voice like Sam Smith, Jin appeals to the deepest part of our souls – that tender, vulnerable side we too often build walls around. His songs truly come from the heart, whether he's dealing with tragedy as on 'Six Feet Above', honoring family (his stepfather) as on 'Father's Land', or trying to leave the world a better place – as in album opener 'Dance with Me'."

His hit single, "11:11" has won him numerous songwriting awards, including the John Lennon Songwriting Award in 2019. He was also chosen as one of the eight finalists out of over 800 contestants for the prestigious NewSong Music Competition in Asheville, NC in November, 2019.

=== 2020: Pandemic & Pivot ===
Jin released multiple original standalone singles including "So Wrong," "Love U Like That," "The Cost (of Loving You)," "Castaway," and "Pages." The COVID-19 pandemic in the United States led to nearly 200 event cancellations and postponed touring plans but Jin released a deluxe version of Baltimore Boulevard, as well as a 31-track Super Deluxe version of Kairos. In December 2020, Jin quietly released a Christmas EP album titled Evergreen.

=== 2022: The Seasons In Between ===
On December 16, 2022, Jin released his fourth full-length album, The Seasons In Between which includes a handful of his popular original singles including "So Wrong," "Love U Like That," "Colder," "Good Kid of Blue," "Pages," and "Lighthouse" the last of which received Grammy Award for Best Male Pop Vocal Performance consideration in 2022.

=== 2026: Praying With Eyes Open ===
On July 19, 2026, a funding campaign was successfully completed on crowdfunding platform Kickstarter with $34,125 to date successfully pledged of an initial $20,000 goal. The campaign also received a special "Projects We Love" designation from Kickstarter. The album was recorded in Nashville, TN being co-produced by friend and producer Aaron Hayes and was released on November 6, 2026. Two lead singles 'Through The Waves' and 'Crayons' along with their respective Official Music Videos were released in October 2026. 'Crayons' amassed over 60,000 streams on Spotify in less than one week and was also played on K-LOVE radio stations across the United States.

== Touring ==
Jin played his first casual concerts as a solo artist in 2014 at various venues around the Nation's Capital Region including Jammin' Java and Ebenezers Coffeehouse. Since the start of 2015 when he decided to do music full-time, he has toured extensively bringing him to over 180 cities. Notable venues Jin has played concerts at include The Bitter End, SideWalk Cafe, Pianos (club), Rockwood Music Hall, Eddie's Attic, Hotel Café, Postcrypt Coffeehouse, Smith's Olde Bar (ATL), Neck of the Woods (SF), and more.

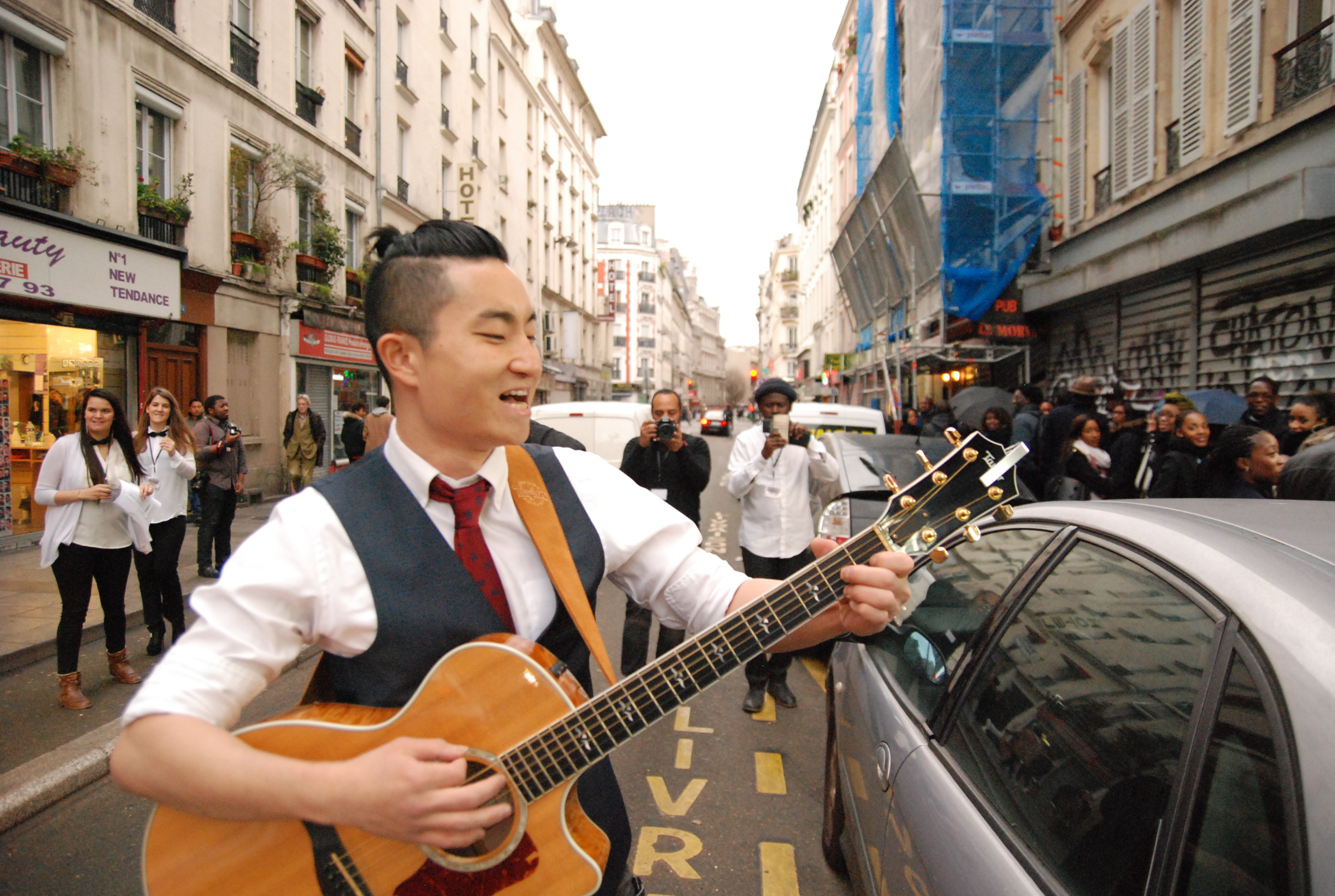
Singing pre-show on the streets of Paris before Jae's concert at Theatre Les Etoiles

Jin has toured throughout North America, Europe (Paris & London), and Asia (South Korea, Bangkok, Tokyo, Taipei, & Singapore).

His longest major touring took place in 2019, when he embarked on a 10 month, 46 city tour.

As of 2026, Jin has played over 800 performances across over 180 cities globally.

== Touring and Studio Recording ==
Current member

- Jae Jin – songwriter, lead vocals, guitar, piano (2015–present)

Producers

- Aaron M. Hayes – 5th album (Praying With Eyes Open), single (Still Flowers Growin') (2024)
- Tim Ouyang – 1st & 3rd Album - Kairos (2015) & Letters & Drinks (2018)
- Sam Ock – 2nd Album (Baltimore Boulevard), Single (Corner Booth)
- Justin Cho – 4th Album (The Seasons In Between) - (Tracks 1,3,8,9,12)
- Andrew J. Choi – 4th Album (The Seasons In Between) - (Tracks 2,6)
- Jae Jin – Albums 1-5, Evergreen EP (2020)

Musicians (Tour + Studio)

- Aaron M. Hayes– electric/acoustic guitar, bass (2024–current)
- Jennifer Jeon– violin (2023–current)
- Michael Lu– violin (2015–current)
- Matt Butler- cello (2026–current)
- Sam Berce- dobro guitar (2026–current)
- James Kirby- acoustic guitar (2026–current)
- Laud Vaught- drums (2025-current)
- Aaron Dick- keys (2026–current)
- Demetri Forakis- horns (2026–current)
- Eric Derwallis- drums (2018-current, studio 2018-current)
- Ryan Schiedermayer – drums (2015-2024)
- Justin Cho – electric/acoustic guitar (2019–2024)
- Tyler Carroll – bass guitar (2016, studio 2015–2018)
- Philip Chuah – bass guitar (2018)
- Andrew J. Choi – electric guitar, acoustic guitar (2016-2020)
- Tre Pham - bass (2019-2022)
- Sam JC Lee - bass (2022)
- Caleb Wu - drums (2020)
- Samuel Park– violin (2023–2024)
- Khoa Le – acoustic guitar (studio 2017-2025)
- Thomas Killian – drums (2016)
- Chris Dean - electric guitar (2022)
- Daniel Mears - drums (2022)
- DJ Estioco – keyboards (2019-2022, studio 2020–2021)
- Joanna M. Hui – violin (2019, studio 2019-2020)
- Nancy Kim – cello (studio 2018)

Notable Recording Studios Used

- Blackbird Studio (Nashville)
- Better Road Records Studio (Chattanooga)
- Total Access Recording Studio (Redondo Beach)
- Engine Room Audio (NYC)
- Arch Audio Recording Studio (Chattanooga)
- BIAS Studio (Washington DC)
- Converse Rubber Tracks (Brooklyn)
- O Studio (Bay Area)

== Influences ==
Jin has cited artists including Bob Dylan, Stevie Wonder, Sam Cooke, The Beatles, and Prince as major influences and often speaks about his varied influences ranging from country to soul to hiphop. His solo live music as a singer-songwriter ranges in genre from folk to blues to soul to rhythm and blues.

== Discography ==
=== Albums ===
Title	Year	Label
Kairos (LP)	2015	Independent
Baltimore Boulevard (LP)	2017	Independent
Letters & Drinks (LP)	2018	Independent
Evergreen (a Christmas EP)	2020	Independent
The Seasons In Between (LP)	2022	Independent
Praying With Eyes Open (LP)	2026	Independent

=== As featured artist ===
- All Ye Nations (2014, single by Tim Be Told)
- The Battle Hymn (2015, Mighty Sound album by Tim Be Told)
- The Great Divide (2016, Friends and Foes album by Tim Be Told)
- Translated Letters (2017, Ashley Court: Chapter 1 album by nak)
- Grace (2020, Love and Happiness album by Tim Be Told)

=== Music has appeared on ===
Korean dramas and TV shows:

- LeeMujin Service - Korean Singer-Songwriter Lee Mu-jin covered Ain't About Love on his TV show
- 2 Days & 1 Night (1박2일)
- Begin Again (TV series) (jtbc)
- One Fine Day (South Korean TV series) Seventeen (South Korean band) (동네의 영웅)
- I Live Alone (TV series) (MBC 나 혼자 산다)
- Childish Bromance 용띠클럽 (KBS)
- Lucky Romance (운빨로맨스)
- Monster (몬스터)
- My Daughter's Men (내 딸의 남자들)
- Local Hero (TV series) (동네의 영웅)
- Sweet, Savage Family (달콤살벌패밀리)
- Mr. Baek: Homemade Food Master (집밥 백선생)
- Please Take Care of My Refrigerator (냉장고를 부탁해)
- How To Eat and Live Well (식사하셨어요)
- Three Meals A Day (삼시세끼)
- The Return of Superman (TV series)
- We Got Married ( 우리 결혼했어요) - Season 4
- Men Are Men (그놈이 그놈이다)
- Show Me the Money (South Korean TV series) Season 7 - Ep.09 (11/02/2018)
- Europe Outside Your Tent
- You Quiz On The Block
- Noona Official 누나 내게 여자야

== Awards ==
Jae Jin has received GRAMMY consideration for songs on all four of his full-length albums, with the most recent for his record 'Lifelines Always Have Two Ends' which received First Ballot consideration in the categories of Song Of The Year, Best Arrangement, Instruments and Vocals in the category of Production, Engineering, Composition & Arrangement, and Best Alternative Music Performance for the 68th Annual GRAMMY Awards.

Previously his song 'Still Flowers Growin' received consideration for the 67th GRAMMY Awards for Best Country Solo Performance and Best Country Song in the category of Country & American Roots Music and Best Arrangement, Instruments and Vocals in the category of Production, Engineering, Composition & Arrangement.

He has also won numerous songwriting awards including the John Lennon Songwriting Award, 1st place in the International Songwriting Competition, and the grand prize in the Music City SongStar competition in Nashville. He was also one of the finalists in the 2019 NewSong Music Competition.

Jae also received a WeWork Creator Award for Outstanding Original Music and Life Story in 2017 and a Mayoral Salute by the City of Baltimore in 2018.
