= Lela Lee =

Korean American cartoonist and actor

- Born: Los Angeles, California
- Occupation: Cartoonist / Actress / Writer
- Years active: 1994–present
- Website: lelalee.com

Lela Lee (born in Los Angeles, California) is an American actress and cartoonist, television writer, and the creator of the animated cartoon Angry Little Asian Girl and the related comic strip Angry Little Girls.

== Career ==
=== Acting career ===
She is a film and television actress, with roles in the 1998 film Yellow and the 2002 film Better Luck Tomorrow. She was a series regular in the short-lived Sci Fi Channel series Tremors, and had a recurring guest role on NBC's Scrubs. Lee made a guest appearance in the first episode of Season Four of HBO's Curb Your Enthusiasm, playing an angry Asian woman, who launches a physical and verbal attack on star Larry David after he suggests Tang is a common Chinese name. Lee was also in the episode "Animal Pragmatism" of Charmed as Tessa, a college student.

==== Angry Little Girls and Angry Little Asian Girl ====
Angry Little Girls was developed as a character she developed in 1994 when she was a sophomore at UC Berkeley. She developed the character after attending Spike and Mike's Sick and Twisted Festival of Animation with a friend. That night, Lee stayed up drawing with typing paper and Crayola markers, and a video camera and made the first episode "Angry Little Asian Girl, the First Day of School." Three years after creating the first episode of the Angry Little Asian Girl, she created four more, and sent the five episodes titled Angry Little Asian Girl, Five Angry Episodes to festivals where they were well-reviewed by critics of the LA Times and LA Weekly. These episodes, like the first, use foul language and shocking imagery to bring attention to issues surrounding the intersection of being Asian and a woman. Audience members came up to her after screenings saying that ALAG spoke for them and that they too had similar experiences growing up in America. Lee then made a batch of T-shirts based on the show.

Lee expanded ALAG to include other girls of different backgrounds and personalities. She took two years to teach herself how to draw comics with books checked out from the library. With the newly created characters, and an umbrella name of "Angry Little Girls" Lee turned her work into a weekly comic strip self-published on her website www.angrylittlegirls.com. Lee added characters of diverse ethnicities and backgrounds to increase her strip's public and commercial appeal. In 2005, the first book of collected Angry Little Girls strips was published by Harry N. Abrams. Following this, several other themed collections of Lee's comics were published by the publisher's imprint, Abrams Comic Arts.

== Filmography ==
=== Television ===
Year	Title	Role	Episodes
1997	Relativity	Tour Guide	Episode: "Billable Hours"
1998	Felicity	Pauline	Episode: "Finally"
1998	Profiler	Kathy Jung	Episode: "Ties that Bind"
2000	Rude Awakening	Joyce	Episode: "Yes Sir, That's my Baby"
2000	Opposite Sex	Judy	Episode: "Homosexual Episode"
2000	Charmed	Tessa	Episode: "Animal Pragmatism"
2001	One on One	Reporter	Episode: "The Way You Make Me Feel"
2001	Friends	Wedding Guest	Episode: "The One With All the Cheesecakes"
2001	What I Like About You	Waitress	Episode: "Holly's First Job"
2001–2002	Scrubs	Bonnie	3 Episodes
2003	Will and Grace	Ping	Episode: "Swimming to Cambodia"
2003	Tremors	Jodi Chang	13 Episodes
2004	10-8 Officers on Duty	Marilyn Choi	Episode: "Flirtin' With Disaster"
2004	Curb Your Enthusiasm	Bobbi	Episode: "Mel's Offer"
2005	Untitled Oakley & Weinstein Project	Officer Chin	Episode: "Pilot"
2007	The Young and the Restless	Speech Therapist	Episode: "1.8672"
2009	The Eastmann's	Mother	Episode: "Pilot"
2014	Angry Little Asian Girl	Kim, Maria, Deborah, misc voices	12 Episodes
2014	Growing Up Fisher	Mrs. Han	2 Episodes
2018–2020	Better Call Saul	Lillian Simmons	2 Episodes

=== Film ===
Year	Title	Role
1996	Flow	Yel Fan
1997	Yellow	Janet
1998	Shopping for Fangs	Naomi
2000	The Girls' Room	Chloe
2000	Rave	Lisa
2000	This Guy is Falling	Alison
2000	The Medicine Show	Incompetent Nurse
2000	The Moment After	Sarone
2001	A Kitty Bobo Show	Maggie
2002	Better Luck Tomorrow	Slapper
2003	Exposed	Missy

== Writing credits ==
- Angry Little Asian Girl (2014) – creator, writer, executive producer.
- The First Day of School (2014) – writer
- Dinner Party (2014) – writer
- Kim's Date (2014) – writer
- Mother Lee's Etiquette (2014) – writer
- Sistahood (2014) – writer
- Deborah's Diet (2014) – writer
- Occupy Placentia (2014) – writer
- Chuy, the Undocumented Chicken (2014) – writer
- Kim's Twinkie Defense (2014) – writer
- Fast Food Rude (2014) – writer
- Xyla's Therapy (2014) – writer
- Anger Management (2014) – writer

== Bibliography ==
- Angry Little Girls (2005)
- Still Angry Little Girls (2006)
- Angry Little Girls in Love (2008)
- Angry Little Girls: A Little Book of Love (2008)
- Fairy Tales for Angry Little Girls (2011)
- Angry Little Girls: A Little Kit for Friends (2013)
