= Kang (Korean surname) =

Korean family name

- Hangul: 강
- Hanja: 姜; 康
- RR: Gang
- MR: Kang

Kang is a Korean family name. All together, the holders of this name number are 1,176,847 in South Korea, according to the 2015 national census, ranking 6th largest Korean family name. While the name "Kang" can actually represent 5 different Hanja, or Chinese characters, the great majority (more than 1 million) bear the surname 姜. The Chinese surname Jiāng also shares the same 姜 character.

== Clans ==
The Royal Seal of the Jinju Kang (姜) Family in the Kingdom of Goguryeo

Clans whose surname uses the Hanja character 姜 include the clans of Jinju and Geumcheon seat. The majority belong to the Jinju Kang clan (ko, alternatively called the Jinyang Kang clan (진양 강씨; 晉陽 姜氏) or the Jinsan Kang clan (진산 강씨; 晉山 姜氏)) (진주 강씨; 晉州 姜氏) is said to be descended from Goguryeo commander Kang I-sik. The Geumcheon Kang clan (ko) (금천 강씨; 衿川 姜氏) is descended from an ancestor whose ancestral seat was Geumcheon, now part of Seoul.

Clans whose surname uses the Hanja character 康 include Sincheon (ko) and Yeonggang (ko). The Sincheon Kang clan is further subdivided into Goksan (ko) (곡산 강씨; 谷山 康氏) and Jaeryeong (재령 강씨; 載寧 康氏).

== Notable individuals ==
=== Historic ===
- Kang I-sik, Goguryeo commander
- Kang Kam-ch'an (948–1031), Goryeo government official and military commander
- Kang Cho (964–1011), Goryeo official
- Gang Hong-rip (1560–1627), Joseon military official
- Kang Hŭian (c. 1417–1464), Joseon scholar and painter
- Kang Sehwang (1713–1791), Joseon government official
- Kang Yun-sŏng (1302–1358), Goryeo civil official

=== Modern ===
- Kang Ae-shim (born 1963), South Korean actress
- Angela Kang (born 1976), American television writer
- Anthony Kang (born 1972), Korean-American professional golfer
- Kang Baek-ho (born 1999), South Korean professional baseball player
- BJ Kang, American FBI special agent
- Kang Bong-kyu (born 1978), South Korean former baseball player
- Kang Boo-ja (born 1941), South Korean actress
- Kang Byul (born 1990), South Korean actress
- Kang Byung-chan (1951–2002), South Korean football manager and former player
- Kang Byung-kyu (born 1972), South Korean former baseball player and broadcaster
- Kang Byung-won (born 1973), South Korean politician
- C.S. Eliot Kang (born 1962), American diplomat
- Kang Chan-hee (born 2000), South Korean singer and actor, member of boy band SF9
- Kang Chang-hee (born 1946), South Korean politician
- Kang Chang-gi (1927–2007), South Korean footballer
- Kang Da-hyun (born 1992), South Korean actress and model
- Kang Dae-ho (stage name Gaho, born 1997), South Korean singer-songwriter and producer
- Kang Daesung (born 1989), South Korean singer, member of boy band BigBang
- Kang Daniel (born 1996), South Korean singer-songwriter, former member of boy band Wanna One
- Dawon Kahng (1931–1992), Korean-American electrical engineer and inventor
- Kang Dong-ho (stage name Baekho, born 1995), South Korean singer, former member of boy band NU'EST
- Dong-Suk Kang (born 1954), South Korean violinist
- Kang Dong-suk (adventurer) (born 1969), South Korean yachtsman
- Gang Dong-won (born 1981), South Korean actor
- Emil Kang (born 1968), Korean-American arts administrator
- Kang Full (born 1974), South Korean webtoon artist
- Gang Gyeong-hyo (born 1964), South Korean modern pentathlete
- Kang Ha-neul (born 1990), South Korean actor
- Kang Hae-rin (born 2006), South Korean singer, member of girl group NewJeans
- Kang Hae-won (born 1986), South Korean badminton player
- Kang Han-byeol (born 2002), South Korean former child actor
- Kang Han-na (born 1989), South Korean actress
- Kang Hee-gun (stage name Gary, born 1978), South Korean rapper
- Kang Ho-dong (born 1970), South Korean entertainer
- Kang Hong-seok (born 1986), South Korean actor
- Kang Hoon (born 1991), South Korean actor
- Kang Hwa-gil (born 1986), South Korean writer
- Kang Hwan-seug, South Korean bureaucrat
- Kang Hye-jung (born 1982), South Korean actress
- Kang Hye-mi (born 1974), South Korean volleyball player
- Kang Hye-won (born 1999), South Korean singer and actress, former member of girl group Iz*One
- Kang Hyeong-cheol, South Korean film director and screenwriter
- Hyun Yi Kang (born 1967), Korean-American scholar and writer
- Kang Hyung-gu (stage name Kino, born 1998), South Korean singer, member of boy band Pentagon
- Kang Hyung-ho (born 1988), South Korean singer
- Kang In-soo (born 1988), South Korean singer and actor
- Jay Caspian Kang (born 1979), American writer and editor
- Kang Je-gyu (born 1962), South Korean film director
- Kang Ji-hwan (born 1977), South Korean retired actor
- Kang Ji-hyun (stage name Soyou, born 1992), South Korean singer, former member of girl group Sistar
- Kang Ji-yong (1989–2025), South Korean footballer
- Kang Ji-young (born 1994), South Korean singer, member of girl group Kara
- Kang Jin-a (born 1981), South Korean film director and screenwriter
- Kang Ju-hyeok (born 2006), South Korean footballer
- Kang Jung-ai (born 1957), South Korean professor and politician
- Kang Jung-ho (born 1987), South Korean former baseball player
- Katherine Anna Kang (born 1970), American video game designer
- Kang Ki-doong (born 1987), South Korean actor
- Kang Ki-young born 1983), South Korean actor
- Kang Kyŏng-ae (1906–1944), Korean feminist writer
- Kang Kyun-sung (born 1981), South Korean singer and television personality, member of boy band Noel
- Kang Kyung-ho (born 1987), South Korean mixed martial artist
- Kang Kyung-hun (born 1975), South Korean actress
- Kang Kyung-jin (born 1973), South Korean former badminton player and coach
- Kang Kyung-joon (born 1983), South Korean actor
- Kang Kyung-min (born 1996), South Korean handball player
- Kang Kyung-ok (born 1965), South Korean manhwa artist
- Kang Kyung-wha (born 1955), South Korean diplomat and politician
- Maggie Kang, South Korea–born Canadian film director
- Kang Mal-geum (born 1979), South Korean actress
- Michael Kang (director) (born 1970), Korean-American film director and screenwriter
- Michael Kang (musician) (born 1971), Korean-American multi-instrumentalist, member of jam band The String Cheese Incident
- Michele Kang (born 1959), South Korea–born American businesswoman
- Michelle Kang (politician), South Korea–born American politician
- Kang Mi-na (born 1999), South Korean singer and actress, former member of girl groups I.O.I and Gugudan
- Kang Min (better known as Nal_rA, born 1982), South Korean former professional StarCraft player
- Kang Min-ah (born 1997), South Korean actress
- Kang Min-hee (born 1991), South Korean singer
- Kang Min-hyuk (born 1991), South Korean musician and actor, member of pop rock band CNBLUE
- Kang Min-hyuk (badminton) (born 1999), South Korean badminton player
- Kang Min-kyung (born 1990), South Korean singer, member of pop duo Davichi
- Minsoo Kang (born 1967), South Korean historian and writer
- Kang Min-soo (born 1986), South Korean footballer
- Kang Na-eon (born 2001), South Korean actress
- Kang Nak-youn (born 1967), South Korean alpine skier
- Kang Nam-gil (born 1958), South Korean actor
- Kang Nung-su (1930–2015), North Korean literary critic and politician
- Kang Oe-jeong (born 1966), South Korean para table tennis player, Paralympic bronze medallist
- Kang Ok-sun (born 1946), North Korean former volleyball player
- Kang Rae-yeon (born 1981), South Korean actress and model
- Kang Ryang-uk (1903–1983), former Vice President of North Korea
- Kang Ryong-woon (born 1942), North Korean professional footballer
- Kang San-eh (born 1963), South Korean folk rock singer-songwriter
- Kang Sang-hee (born 1998), South Korean footballer
- Kang Sang-jae (born 1994), South Korean professional basketball player
- Kang Sang-jung (born 1950), Japanese-born South Korean academic
- Kang Sang-woo (born 1993), South Korean professional footballer
- Kang Sang-yoon (born 2004), South Korean footballer
- Kang Se-jung (born 1982), South Korean actress
- Kang Seul-gi (born 1994), South Korean singer, member of girl group Red Velvet
- Kang Seung-yoon (born 1994), South Korean singer, member of boy band Winner
- Kang Shin-hyo (born 1989), South Korean actor
- Kang Shin-il (born 1960), South Korean actor
- Kang Si-ra (born 1991), South Korean singer
- Kang So-ra (born 1990), South Korean actress
- Kang Sok-kyong (born 1951), South Korean author
- Kang Soo-yeon (1966–2022), South Korean actress
- Kang Soo-yun (born 1976), South Korean professional golfer
- Sukhee Kang (born 1952), American politician
- Suki Seokyeong Kang (1977–2025), South Korean visual artist
- Sung Kang (born 1972), American actor
- Kang Sung-hoon (singer) (born 1980), South Korean singer, former member of boy band Sechs Kies
- Kang Sung-hoon (golfer) (born 1987), South Korean professional golfer
- Sung-Mo Kang, American electrical engineering scientist
- Kang Tae-joo (born 1995), South Korean actor and model
- Kang Tae-hyun (born 2002), South Korean singer, member of boy group Tomorrow X Together
- Tim Kang (born 1973), American actor
- Kang We-suck (born 1986), South Korean civil rights activist
- Kang Woo-suk (born 1960), South Korean film producer and director
- Kang Ye-seo (born 2005), South Korean singer and actress, member of girl group Kep1er
- Kang Ye-won (born 1979), South Korean actress
- Kang Yeo-sang (born 1999), South Korean singer and dancer, member of boy group ATEEZ
- Kang Yi-seok (born 1998), South Korean actor
- Kang Yong-sop (1931–2012), North Korean politician
- Kang You-seok (born 1994), South Korean actor
- Younghill Kang (1898–1972), Korean-American writer
- Kang Young-hoon (1922–2016), South Korean politician
- Kang Young-hyun (stage name Young K, born 1993), South Korean singer, member of pop rock band Day6
- Kang Young-joong (born 1949), South Korean businessman
- Young Woo Kang (1944–2012), Korean-American disability rights advocate and author
- Kang Yu-chan (born 1997), South Korean singer and actor, member of boy band A.C.E
- Kang Yu-jeong (born 1996), South Korean judoka
- Kang Yu-mi (comedian) (born 1983), South Korean comedian and actress
- Kang Yu-mi (footballer) (born 1991), South Korean footballer
- Kang Yun-gu (born 2002), South Korean footballer
- Kang Yun-mi (speed skater) (born 1988), South Korean short track speed skater, Olympic gold medallist
- Kang Yun-mi (gymnast) (born 1988), North Korean artistic gymnast
- Kang Yun-seong (director) (born 1971), South Korean film director and scriptwriter

== See also ==
- List of Korean family names
- Korean name
