= Kang I-sik =

Goguryeo military commander

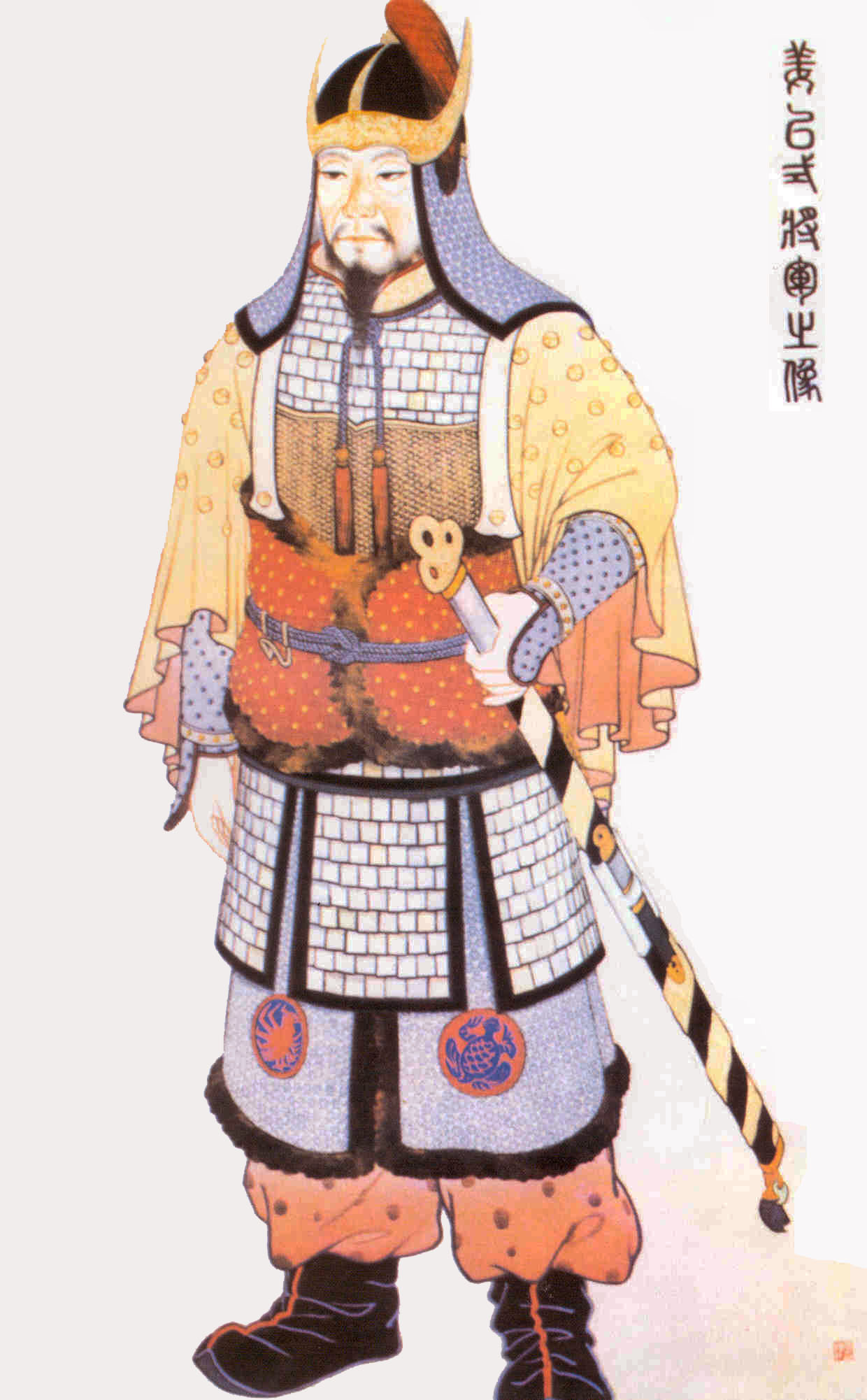
- General Kang I-sik

Korean name
- Hangul: 강이식
- Hanja: 姜以式
- RR: Gang Isik
- MR: Kang Isik

Kang I-sik (Korean: 강이식; Hanja: 姜以式) was a Goguryeo commander in the 590s. He is mentioned in the genealogy of Jinju Kang clan and the Joseon Sanggosa, written by Shin Chae-ho.

== Interpretation in the Joseon Sanggosa ==
In 598, King Yeongyang launched a joint preemptive invasion with the Malgal against Chinese Sui dynasty outposts along the border in present-day Hebei province. Sui Emperor Wendi ordered his fifth and youngest son, Yang Liang (assisted by the co-prime minister Gao Jiong), and Admiral Zhou Luohou, to conquer Goguryeo with an army and navy totaling 300,000.

Yang Liang's army faced the early rainy season when it reached Goguryeo. The unseasonably heavy rain made the army's progress almost impossible and hampered the transport of provisions. Constant attacks by Goguryeo forces and illness inflicted heavy casualties. Coming to the conclusion that the army could not achieve the objective on its own, Yang Yang decided to combine with Zhou's naval fleet and proceed.

Zhou's navy also came across their own challenges, contending with rough seas, losing many ships despite staying close to the coastline. Whenever they anchored, Goguryeo detachments were present to attack the Sui sailors. The fleet engaged in a battle against a Goguryeo fleet totaling 50,000 led by Admiral Kang I-sik, presumably on the present Bohai Sea. Already weakened by ambushes and nature's onslaught, the Sui fleet suffered a devastating loss.

The Sui forces were all defeated, both at land and sea. Historical texts record that about 90% of the Sui troops perished. Goguryeo casualties are thought to be almost nonexistent compared to those of Sui. Yang Yang faced no option but retreat.

In 612, Sui Emperor Yangdi ordered preparations for a war against the Goguryeo. The force gathered by year's end was one of the greatest in civilization according to the Book of Sui. An estimated 1,133,000 combat troops were mobilized. King Yeongyang appointed him to both: land and sea supreme commander (수륙양군병마도원수, 水陸兩軍兵馬都元帥).

The Sui army and navy made a vigorous attack. Ŭlchi Mundŏk, another supreme commander, repulsed the assailants. General Ŭlchi dislodged the Sui army from the Battle of Salsu. With the victory over Sui dynasty in Salsu, Goguryeo eventually became the victor of the war itself, while the Sui dynasty started to crumble from within and was finally brought down by internal strife.

General Kang died during the reign of King Yeongnyu at a very old age. He is the ancestor of the present-day Jinju Kang clan.

== See also ==
- Goguryeo
- Goguryeo-Sui Wars
- Ŭlchi Mundŏk
