= Siege of Yodong Fortress =

The siege of Yodong Fortress may refer to:

- Siege of Yodong Fortress (612), part of the Goguryeo–Sui War
- Siege of Yodong Fortress (645), part of the Goguryeo–Tang War
