= Ŭlchi Mundŏk hansi =

Ancient Korean poem

- Hangul: 을지문덕 한시
- Hanja: 乙支文德漢詩
- RR: Eulji Mundeok hansi
- MR: Ŭlchi Mundŏk hansi

"Ŭlchi Mundŏk hansi" (Korean: 을지문덕 한시; Hanja: 乙支文德漢詩), or "Yŏsujang Ujungmunsi" (여수장우중문시; 餘隋將于仲文詩; lit. a poem for Sui general Yu Zhongwen) is an ancient Korean poem.

== Context ==
In the second Goguryeo-Sui War, Ŭlchi Mundŏk maneuvered the Goguryeo troops so that they engaged the Sui army seven times a day, each time feigning defeat and retreating, leading the Sui army deeper south with the perception of victory. The Sui army eventually advanced to about 20 km from Pyongyang, the capital of Goguryeo. However, realizing the advanced hunger and exhaustion of his troops, and perceiving the formidable fortifications of Pyeongyang, Yu Zhongwen realised the looming impossibility of continuing the campaign. To taunt Yu Zhongwen, Ŭlchi wrote the caustic poem and sent it to the enemy general. The Sui army was annihilated at the Battle of Salsu.

== Text ==
Poem
Hanja	Hangul	English
神策究天文	신책구천문	Your divine plans have plumbed the heavens;
妙算窮地理	묘산궁지리	Your subtle reckoning has spanned the earth;
戰勝功旣高	전승공기고	You win every battle, your military merit is great;
知足願云止	지족원운지	Why then not be content and stop the war?

== See also ==
- Korean poetry
- Korean literature
