= Battle of Linyuguan =

598 part of the Goguryeo–Sui War

Siege of Linyu Pass
- Part of the Goguryeo-Sui Wars
| Date | 598 |
| Location | Linyuguan, present-day Shanhaiguan, Liaoxi |
| Result | Tactical Sui dynasty victory |

Belligerents
| Goguryeo; Mohe | Sui dynasty |

Commanders and leaders
| King Yeongyang; Kang I-sik | Wei Chong; Yang Liang; Zhou Luohou |

Strength
| 10,000 | Unknown |

Casualties and losses
| Unknown | Unknown |

The Battle of Linyuguan (Yohwa) (臨渝關) was fought in 598 as part of the Goguryeo-Sui Wars.

In 597, tensions increased between Emperor Wen of Sui and King Yeongyang. Kang I-sik suggested that his king attack the Sui dynasty. King Yeongyang accepted and led 10,000 Mohe army himself along with more troops led by Kang I-sik. The Goguryeo army repeatedly attacked the pass at Linyuguan, but Wei Chong (韋冲), Governor of Yingzhou, defeated them.

In 598, Emperor Wen of Sui collected an army of 300,000 troops to defend the pass. He gave 200,000 troops to Yang Liang who is the fourth son of Emperor Wen and 100,000 marines to Zhou Luohou. All following attacks by Goguryeo on Linyuguan failed.

== See also ==
- Military history of Goguryeo
- List of China-related topics
- History of China
- History of Korea
