= Battle of Salsu =

612 battle of the Goguryeo–Sui War

- Part of the Goguryeo–Sui War
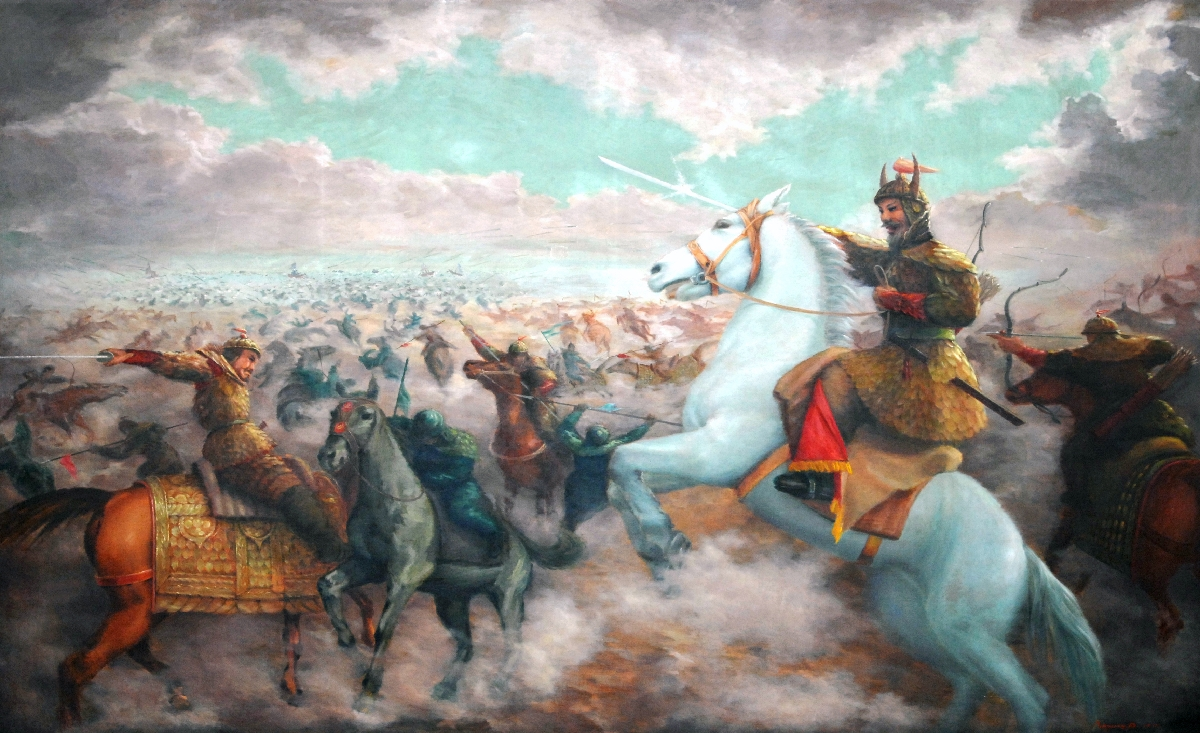
- Battle of Salsu
Date	612
Location	Salsu River, present-day Cheongcheon River
Result	Goguryeo victory

Belligerents
Sui dynasty	Goguryeo • East Turk Khaganate

Commanders and leaders
Yu Zhongwen; Yuwen Shu	Ŭlchi Mundŏk

Strength
305,000 (nominal)	10,000

Casualties and losses
302,300 casualties	Unknown

The Battle of Salsu was a major battle that occurred in the year 612 during the second campaign of the Goguryeo–Sui War between Goguryeo of Korea and Sui of China. Goguryeo won an overwhelming victory over the numerically superior Sui forces at Salsu River.

== History ==
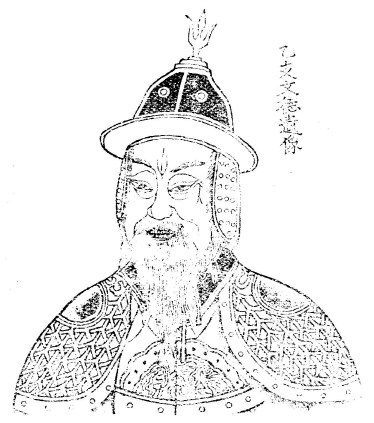
An old portrait of Ŭlchi Mundŏk, the field marshal of Goguryeo during the second Goguryeo-Sui war

Battle of Salsu
- Traditional Chinese: 薩水之戰
- Simplified Chinese: 萨水之战
Transcriptions
Standard Mandarin
- Hanyu Pinyin: Sàshuǐ zhī zhàn

- Korean name
- Hangul: 살수 대첩
- Hanja: 薩水大捷
- RR: Salsu daecheop
- MR: Salsu taech'ŏp

In 612, Emperor Yang of Sui invaded Goguryeo with 1,138,000 men. Unable to overcome the stalwart Goguryeo defense at Yodong Fortress and other fortifications in Liaodong, he dispatched 300,000 troops to directly take Pyongyang, the capital of Goguryeo.

The Sui forces labored in their advance to the Goguryeo capital, due to the internal discord within the Sui military command and a poor supply line. Troops had been given a large amount of supplies which were expected to last the entire march, a heavy burden which ended up being abandoned by exhausted troops en route. Goguryeo General Ŭlchi Mundŏk gauged the morale and exhaustion of the Sui army by feigning surrender and touring the Sui camp. Although the Sui commander Yu Zhongwen had been instructed by Emperor Yang to capture Ŭlchi Mundŏk upon encounter, another general, Liu Shilong, recommended Ŭlchi's release to negotiate surrender terms with the Goguryeo King Yeongyang. After his successful escape and fully aware of the Sui army's turmoil, Ŭlchi lured the Sui troops deep into Goguryeo territory, furthering the Sui troops' exhaustion and worsening morale.

Although the Sui army approached Pyongyang, troops were in no condition to besiege the fortified capital without any further supplies. The army expected to be supplied upon arrival at Pyongyang by a naval force commanded by Lai Hu'er, but they had been already defeated by Goguryeo troops in an ambush within Pyongyang by Go Geonmu, the King's younger half-brother. Realizing their situation and goaded by Ŭlchi's poem encouraging retreat (Ŭlchi Mundŏk hansi), the Sui commanders decided to retreat back to Liaodong. Goguryeo forces then pursued the retreating Sui forces in a series of attacks, culminating in a climactic battle at Salsu, where pursuing Goguryeo troops cut down vulnerable Sui troops crossing the river Chongchon. Korean nationalist historian Sin Chaeho and modern popular portrayals float the idea of Ŭlchi using a dam to inflict damage on the Sui army, but no contemporaneous source attests to the use of a dam or a water attack.

The surviving Sui troops were forced to retreat at a breakneck pace to the Liaodong Peninsula to avoid being killed or captured. Many retreating soldiers died of disease or starvation as their army had exhausted their food supplies. This led to an overall campaign loss of all but 2,700 Sui troops out of 305,000 men. The Battle of Salsu is listed among the most lethal "classical formation" battles in world history.

== Aftermath ==
The near-annihilation of the contingent sent to Pyongyang, along with the lack of progress in Liaodong, forced Emperor Yang to retreat without any major gains. Commanders Yu Zhongwen and Yuwen Shu were put in chains and demoted to commoners, with Yu Zhongwen dying shortly after returning to Sui and Yuwen Shu eventually reinstated to military duty for future campaigns. Liu Shilong was executed for defying the Emperor's order to capture Ŭlchi. Emperor Yang attempted two more invasions in 613 and 614, but both ended in failure. Eventually, the enormous human and financial costs of the campaigns resulted in multiple rebellions and the empire started to crumble from within. It was finally brought down by internal strife and replaced by the Tang, who would continue campaigns against Goguryeo in the Goguryeo-Tang wars.
