= Lai Hu'er =

- 來護兒

Personal details
- Born: unknown Yangzhou
- Died: 618; Yangzhou
- Children: Lai Heng, Lai Ji
- Parent: Lai Famin (father)
- Occupation: General in Sui dynasty
- Courtesy name: Chongshan (崇善)
- Title: Duke of Rong (榮國公)

Lai Hu'er, courtesy name Chongshan, titled Duke of Rong, was a general in Sui dynasty of China. He played an important role in the conquest of Chen dynasty in 589, as well as the campaigns against Goguryeo led by Emperor Yang.

== In history ==
Lai Hu'er was born in Guangling (today's Yangzhou) during the late Southern and Northern Dynasties period. His parents died when he was young, and he was adopted by Aunt Wu, the wife of his father's elder brother. In 581, Yang Jian overthrew the Northern Zhou dynasty and established Sui dynasty. To prepare for the war against Chen dynasty in the south, Sui dynasty ordered the general He Ruobi to lead a troop to guard Shouzhou, a city near Guangling. Lai Hu'er thus had a chance to join the Sui army. He Ruobi sent Lai Hu'er to Chen dynasty as a spy. Lai Hu'er made several contributions as a spy and was promoted to be a Da Dudu (Chinese: 大都督; lit. 'Grand commander of troops'). In 589, Sui launched massive campaigns against the Chen dynasty in order to unify China. Lai Hu'er took part in this war and was further promoted to be a high-ranked official in the military after the war.

In 590, because people in the previous Chen dynasty were unaccustomed of Sui's laws, they rebelled against Sui under the leadership of Gao Zhihui. The Emperor Wen of Sui ordered Yang Su and Lai Hu'er to put down the rebellion. During the campaign, Lai Hu'er provided a good strategy that eventually helped Sui defeat the rebels. After this campaign, Lai Hu'er was promoted to be the Grand General, given a title of Duke of Xiangyang County, and appointed to be the governor of Quanzhou. In the same year, Lai Hu'er defeated some other remnants forces of Gao Zhihui and was promoted to Duke of Yongning Prefecture.

In 604 after Emperor Yang became the new emperor, Lai Hu'er was promoted to be a top general of the royal guard army in the central court. His title was also promoted to be Duke of Rong. He was the favorite general to Emperor Yang. When Emperor Yang was touring the empire, he always let Lai Hu'er to be his personal guard outside of the palace. During his service as a senior general, he discovered the talent of Qin Shubao and predicted that Qin would eventually be a great general.

In 612, Emperor Yang launched his first campaign against Goguryeo. In this campaign, Lai Hu'er was appointed to be the Chief Commander of Pyongyang Circuit. He led the naval force of Sui dynasty to attack Goguryeo, and defeated the Goguryeo army 30 kilometers away from the Pyongyang city. He then ordered his troops to attack Pyongyang. His vice commander Zhou Fashang suggested that they should be careful because Goguryeo people were good at ambushing. Lai Hu'er did not take that suggestion. He marched towards the Pyongyang city with 40,000 men, and was ambushed by Goguryeo army outside of the city. Fortunately, Zhou Fashang reinforced him with the rest of the Sui troops so that Lai Hu'er managed to retreat back to the harbor. After other circuits of Sui dynasty attacking the Goguryeo from land were all defeated in Liaodong, Lai Hu'er retreated back to Sui dynasty.

In 613, Emperor Yang launched the second campaign against Goguryeo. Lai Hu'er, again, was ordered to lead the navy as the Chief Commander of Canghai Circuit to attack Pyongyang from the sea. Not long after the campaign started, Yang Xuangan rebelled against Sui in Luoyang. Lai Hu'er decided to draw back from Korea immediately and to encircle Yang Xuangan with some of other Sui generals such as Yuwen Shu. His vice commander Zhou Fashang was afraid that if they draw back without the permission from the emperor, they would be punished. Lai said that Goguryeo was only like a minor illness, but Yang Xuangan was like a life-threatening disease to Sui dynasty. Then, he took his men back to Sui dynasty and eventually suppressed Yang Xuangan along with other Sui forces. The emperor was pleased with his decision and promoted him to be a chancellor.

In 614, during the third campaign against Goguryeo, Lai Hu'er led the navy for the third time and defeated Goguryeo army during a battle at Sabi. King Yeongyang of Goguryeo was scared by Lai's attack and thus surrendered to Emperor Yang. Lai planned to continue attacking the Goguryeo, but the emperor accepted Goguryeo's surrender and asked Lai to withdraw.

In 615, when Emperor Yang was touring the northern border of the emperor, he was encircled by Tujue at Yanmen. Lai Hu'er led his troop to protect the general at Yanmen, and successfully held the city until reinforcements led by other Sui generals such as Li Shimin and Wang Shichong arrived. In 618, when Emperor Yang was touring the Jiangdu, Yuwen Huaji led a military mutiny. Emperor Yang was killed. Lai Hu'er was also killed during the fight in order to protect the emperor. Most of his sons were also executed by Yuwen Huaji after the mutiny.

== In popular culture ==
Lai Hu'er was one of the prototypes that inspired the creation of the popular fictional figure Yang Lin. Folk tale writers in ancient China mixed stories of Lai Hu'er, Zhang Xutuo and Yang Shuang and created the story of Yang Lin that would be one of the most celebrated fictional figures in the folk culture. In some other versions of folk tales, Lai Hu'er was portrayed as a great warrior whose weapon was a steel spear.

== Family ==
Notable ancestors:

- Lai She: Marquis of Pacifying the Qiang in Han dynasty
- Lai Leng: Cousin of Emperor Guangwu of Han dynasty
- Lai Yan: A chancellor in Han dynasty
- Lai Min: A general and scholar of Shu Han kingdom during Three Kingdoms period

Great Grandfather:

- Lai Cheng: Marquis of Xinye County in Northern Wei dynasty, and later surrendered to Liang dynasty

Grandfather:

- Lai Yi: A mid-ranked general in Liang dynasty

Father:

- Lai Famin: A local governor in Chen dynasty

Sons: Lai Hu'er had 12 sons. Six of them were recorded in the history with names. Other sons were all killed by Yuwen Huaji during the mutiny in Jiangdu.

- Lai Kai: the eldest son. A mid-ranked official in the central court of Sui dynasty, and was killed by Yuwen Huaji.
- Lai Yuan: the second son. Joined the rebellion of Yang Xuangan, and was defeated by Lai Hu'er and Yuwen Shu.
- Lai Hong: the fifth son. A high-ranked official in the central court of Sui dynasty, and was killed by Yuwen Huaji.
- Lai Zheng: the sixth son. Duke of Xiangyang County. Killed by Yuwen Huaji.
- Lai Heng: the eleventh son. Survived in the Jiangdu Mutiny, and became a chancellor in Tang dynasty.
- Lai Ji: the twelfth son. Survived in the Jiangdu Mutiny, and became a chancellor in Tang dynasty.

Notable descendant:

- Monk Benzhi
