= Goguryeo–Sui War =

Series of failed invasions of Korea by Sui-dynasty China between 598 and 614

Date	598, 612–614
Location	Manchuria, Northern Korean Peninsula, Yellow Sea
Result	Goguryeo victory

Belligerents
Goguryeo; Eastern Turkic Khaganate	Sui dynasty

Commanders and leaders
King Yeongyang; Ŭlchi Mundŏk; Go Geonmu; Kang I-sik (?)	Emperor Yang of Sui; Yang Liang; Gao Jiong; Yuwen Shu; Yu Zhongwen; Qutu Tong; Lai Hu'er; Zhou Luohou; Yuchi Yichen; Huang Junhan; Ashina Danai

Strength
300,000 troops	Nominally 1,133,800 combat troops with around 2,000,000 support troops during the second invasion of 612, according to the Book of Sui and Samguk Sagi. Modern estimate: 670,000

Casualties and losses
Unknown	At least 302,300 casualties

The Goguryeo–Sui War were a series of invasions launched by the Sui dynasty of China against Goguryeo, one of the Three Kingdoms of Korea, between AD 598 and AD 614. It resulted in the defeat of the Sui and was one of the pivotal factors in the collapse of the dynasty, which led to its overthrow by the Tang dynasty in AD 618.

== Background ==
The Sui dynasty reunited China in AD 589, defeating the Chen dynasty and ending the division of the country that spanned almost 300 years. After the reunification of China, Sui asserted its position as an overlord of neighbouring countries. However, in Goguryeo, one of the Three Kingdoms of Korea, king Pyeongwon and his successor, Yeongyang, insisted on maintaining an equal relationship with the Sui dynasty.

Emperor Wen of Sui was displeased with the challenge from Goguryeo, which continued small scale raiding into Sui's northern border. Wen sent diplomatic papers in 596 after Sui envoys spotted Goguryeo diplomats in the yurt of the Eastern Turkic Khaganate and demanded the Goguryeo to cancel any military alliance with the Turks, stop the annual raiding of Sui border regions, and acknowledge Sui as their overlord. After receiving the message, Yeongyang launched a joint pre-emptive invasion with the Malgal against the Chinese along the border in present-day Hebei province in 597.

== Course of the war ==
=== First invasion in 598 ===
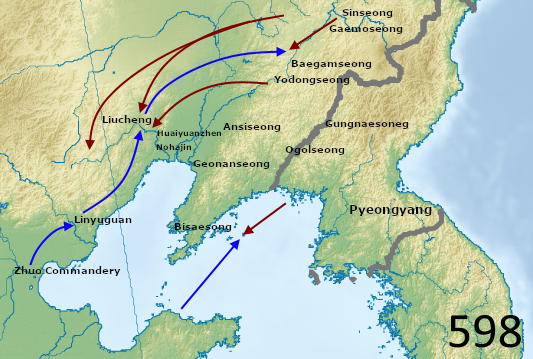
1st Goguryeo-Sui War, 598

Emperor Wen ordered his fifth and youngest son, Yang Liang (assisted by the co-prime minister Gao Jiong), and Admiral Zhou Luohou (周羅睺), to invade and conquer Goguryeo with an army and navy totaling 300,000, mostly composed of horse archers.

Yang Liang's army faced the early rainy season when it reached Goguryeo. The unseasonably heavy rain made the army's progress almost impossible and hampered the transport of provisions. Constant attacks by Goguryeo forces and illness inflicted heavy casualties. Coming to the conclusion that the army could not achieve the objective on its own, Yang decided to combine with Zhou's naval fleet and proceed.

Zhou's navy also came across their own challenges, contending with rough seas, losing many ships despite staying close to the coastline. Whenever they anchored, Goguryeo detachments were present to attack the Sui sailors, and the Sui fleet suffered devastating losses.

=== Second invasion in 612 ===
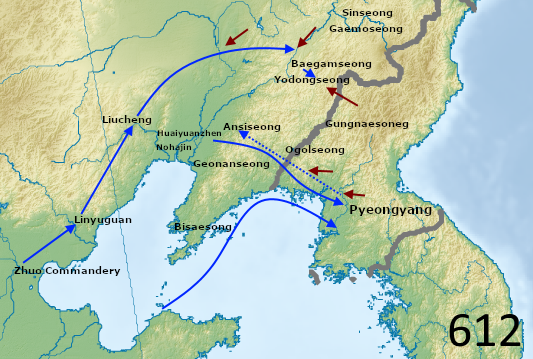
2nd Goguryeo-Sui War, 612

==== Preparations ====
Emperor Yang of Sui built the Grand Canal after rising to the throne in 604. The south, the economic base of China, and the north, the political base of China, were connected by the canal, allowing transportation of troops for the massive military campaign.

After the construction of the canal, Emperor Yang ordered the enlisting of soldiers in 611. He instructed them to gather in present-day Beijing. The force gathered by year's end was one of the greatest in civilization, according to the Book of Sui, which states that 1,133,800 troops were mobilized. The army began to depart in early 612, and its size made it take 40 days for all soldiers to depart. The long line of soldiers stretched for about 300 km. The strength and losses of the army may have been exaggerated by Tang dynasty historians.

==== Campaign in Manchuria ====
The Goguryeo monarch Yeongyang gave up the buffer zone that he had acquired after the war of 598, as the area was not suitable to face such a vast army. The Goguryeo troops retreated behind what is now known as the Liao River. A fortunate event for Goguryeo was that the river melted much sooner than usual. By the time Emperor Yang arrived, the ice had all melted, and Yeongyang's forces were on the opposite side of the river. Undaunted, Emperor Yang ordered the construction of three bridges across the river. The bridges however, were too short to reach the opposite bank in another fortunate turn of events for the defenders, and Goguryeo's attack successfully held off the first assault. After the extension of the bridges however, the Sui forces succeeded in crossing the river, and the army surrounded the fortresses of Goguryeo.

Before the campaigns, Emperor Yang ordered his generals not to make individual decisions regarding the movement of troops, but to report to him to receive instruction. This policy hampered Sui strategy throughout the campaign. During the strategically important campaign against the Yodong fortress, the general commanding the siege had to send a messenger to the emperor for the approval of the surrender. By the time the messenger returned to the fortress, Goguryeo's troops had again become ready to defend the fortress. Exploiting this flaw in the Sui system, Yodong and other castles of Goguryeo continued to hold on. By June, five months after the start of the campaign, not a single castle, fortress, or citadel has fallen to Sui. Emperor Yang felt that a fundamental change in strategy was needed to seize control of Korea.

==== Campaign against Pyongyang ====
The new strategy was to keep the fortresses of Goguryeo in Manchuria at bay, while sending a contingent of army and navy to take Pyongyang, Goguryeo's capital. An army contingent, allegedly with a strength of 305,000, and a naval fleet of some 120,000 were dispatched.

==== Naval assault ====
The Sui navy reached the bay of the Daedong River before the army. Seeing that the Sui army had not arrived yet, Go Geonmu, commander of the defence army of Goguryeo at Pyeongyang and brother of King Yeongyang, sent what few troops remained in the capital to engage the Sui navy in battle. Feigning defeat after the battle, Goguryeo troops retreated into the city. The Sui naval commander, Lai Huni, considering it to be a chance to add to his merit, led a host of more than 40,000 to lay assault against Pyeongyang.

When the Sui soldiers reached one of the outer castles, they found it undefended and the gate open. Upon entering the castle, Lai, considering the engagement in the outskirts a decisive move of Goguryeo that failed, looted and destroyed the art and fortune of the outer castle.

Once the looting of the castle started, the death-defying corps of Goguryeo, consisting of 500 troops, ambushed the Sui troops. Confused and disoriented, Lai ran to the fleet at the sea. His army of 40,000 was reduced to mere thousands.

==== Sui army's campaign ====
The army contingent, led by generals Yu Zhongwen and Yuwen Shu, had their own problems. While the supply could be transported safely within China, once it reached Goguryeo territory, there was a danger of ambush by Goguryeo forces. Emperor Yang tried to solve this issue by instructing each soldier to carry food for himself, but this greatly increased each soldier's carrying load. Many resorted to discarding the food. By the time it had reached the Yalu River, the army's shortage of provisions was acute.

Yeongyang decided to assess the strength of the Sui army by ordering his Commander Field Marshal Ŭlchi Mundŏk to fake a surrender and peace negotiation terms with the Sui generals. Generals Wu and Yuwen had their own secret order from Emperor Yang to seize Yeongyang or Ŭlchi Mundŏk if they should fall into their hands. However, the generals' advisers, notably the assistant director of the Right of the Department of State Affairs, Liu Shilong (劉士龍), convinced them it would be unwise to arrest negotiators from the opposing camp. They ultimately let Ŭlchi return to Goguryeo and Yu Zhongwen later regretted his decision, attempting to lure Ŭlchi Mundŏk back. He sent a message that he wished to discuss things further but Ŭlchi Mundŏk, aware of Wu's intentions, did not comply.

The two generals argued about the next course of action, with Yu Zhongwen arguing strongly that Ŭlchi Mundŏk should be pursued. They did agree that the Goguryeo capital should be captured. Accordingly, the Sui troops began advancing south towards Pyeongyang. Ŭlchi Mundŏk maneuvered the Goguryeo troops so that they engaged the Sui army seven times a day, each time faking defeat and retreat. The strategy would draw the Sui army deeper south with the perception of victory. The Sui army eventually advanced to about 20 km from Pyeongyang. Yu Zhongwen later recognized that his advancing troops were suffering from exhaustion, and that combined with the fortifications of Pyeongyang, the city was unseigeable .

Yu was caught in a dilemma and could not decide on advance or retreat. For the occasion, Ŭlchi Mundŏk sent him a poem:

Your divine plans have plumbed the heavens; Your subtle reckoning has spanned the earth. You win every battle, your military merit is great. Why then not be content and stop the war?

When no response came, Ŭlchi sent a representative. The plan now was to offer Emperor Yeongyang to Emperor Yang escort to submission if the Sui army would withdraw. Seizing the opportunity to retreat, Yu withdrew his troops towards Sui.

==== Battle of Salsu River ====
When Sui army had reached Salsu (thought to be the present-day Chongchon River), Goguryeo charged at the remaining Sui army. Ŭlchi Mundŏk defended fortresses against the Sui army and navy for several months and attacked the Sui troops while retreating into Goguryeo territory. When the Sui army had reached Salsu, Ŭlchi Mundŏk's force slaughtered them. The historical text records that Sui soldiers had to run almost 200 km that day to escape death. The Battle of Salsu contributed to the massive overall casualty figure for Sui during the campaign. Out of the initial 305,000 men Emperor Yang crossed the Liao River with to attack Goguryeo, only 2,700 returned.

=== Third Invasion in 613 ===
Emperor Yang invaded Liaodong again the following year (613), but was again obliged to retreat without success. While Emperor Yang was away, Yang Xuangan, the son of Emperor Yang's prime minister Yang Su, began a rebellion against Emperor Yang. Fearing attack from two fronts, Emperor Yang was forced to retreat and use his army to put down Yang Xuangan's rebellion.

=== Fourth Invasion in 614 ===
After crushing the revolt, Emperor Yang invaded Goguryeo again in 614. He managed to breach Goguryeo's first line of defences without capturing the frontier fortress, but he could not advance far beyond Liao River because of Goguryeo's constant attacks and obstruction to his supply lines. Yeongyang, seeing a chance to end the exhausting wars, offered peace and returned Yang Xuangan's associate Husi Zheng (斛斯政), who had fled to Goguryeo after Yang Xuangan's rebellion, to Sui. Perceiving the little success in Goguryeo and the increasing internal discontent in China, Emperor Yang accepted Yeongyang's offer of peace and withdrew Sui troops from Goguryeo's territory. However, the king of Goguryeo never showed up to swear allegiance, which infuriated Emperor Yang, who was dissuaded, only with difficulty, from launching another invasion against Goguryeo.

== Aftermath ==
The losses that Sui suffered, in terms of lives and resources, and consequently in the trust the people had in the Sui state, contributed to the fall of the Sui dynasty. Peasants, farmers, soldiers, aristocrats, and landlords rose up against the emperor along with many of the dynasty's military officers. Yangdi moved the capital to the south in Yangzhou, but the revolts were too widespread. Yuwen Shu's son, Yuwen Huaji, became a powerful Sui general who led a successful coup against Yangdi and personally murdered him. That would complete the transition from Sui to Tang, as the Duke of Tang proclaimed himself emperor of a new dynasty.

== See also ==
- Military history of Goguryeo
- History of China
- History of Korea
- Goguryeo–Tang War

== Sources ==
- Asmolov, Konstantin V. "The System of Military Activity of Koguryô." Korea Journal 32:2 (Summer 1992): 103–116.
- Gabriel, Richard A. and Boose, Donald W. "The Korean Way of War: Salsu River." In Richard A. Gabriel and Donald W. Boose. The Great Battles of Antiquity: A Strategic and Tactical Guide to Great Battles that Shaped the Development of War. Westport, CN: Greenwood Press, 1994.
- Graff, David A., Medieval Chinese Warfare, 300–900. ISBN 0-415-23954-0
