= Emil Kang =

American arts administrator (born 1968)

Emil J. Kang
- Born: 1968 (age 57–58); New York City
- Education: University of Rochester
- Occupation: Arts Administrator and Foundation Executive
- Spouse: Lisa Marie Kang
- Children: Emma Kang

Emil J. Kang (born 1968) is an American arts administrator and cultural strategist who currently serves as the Agnes Gund Visiting Professor of the Practice of Arts at Brown University. He previously served as program director for arts and culture at The Andrew W. Mellon Foundation from 2019 to 2024.

== Early life and background ==
Born in New York City to Korean immigrant parents, Kang is a descendant of the historic Jinju Kang clan.

== Education ==
Kang earned his Bachelor of Arts degree in Economics from the University of Rochester, with a minor in Art History. He also completed a Certificate of Management Studies in Accounting/Finance from the William E. Simon Graduate School of Business Administration at Rochester.

=== Brown University (2024-Present) ===
Kang currently serves as the Agnes Gund Visiting Professor of the Practice of Arts at Brown University's Brown Arts Institute, where he teaches courses on artistic innovation and entrepreneurship.

== National Recognition and Service ==
Presidential Appointment

In 2012, President Barack Obama recognized Kang's contributions to American cultural life by nominating him to serve on the National Council on the Arts, making him the first Korean-American to hold this position.

Board Leadership and Cultural Advocacy

Kang's influence permeates the cultural ecosystem through his extensive board service. He currently serves on the board of directors of Silkroad, the innovative arts collective founded by Yo-Yo Ma, and maintains active roles as Vice Chair of the New York City Cultural Affairs Advisory Commission and as a Council Member of the Council of Korean Americans.

His previous board affiliations span the cultural spectrum, including the Martha Graham Dance Company, the International Society for the Performing Arts, EMCArts, the Association of Performing Arts Professionals, the North Carolina Symphony, and the Thomas S. Kenan Institute for the Arts at the University of North Carolina School of the Arts.

Awards and Recognition

Kang has received numerous honors including the William S. Dawson Award for Programmatic Excellence from the Association of Performing Arts Professionals (2020), the Centennial Medal from the International Institute of Education for service to the Artist Protection Fund (2020), and induction into The Watauga Club, North Carolina (2015) and the Order of the Golden Fleece at UNC-Chapel Hill (2013).
