= Lai Ji =

Chinese Tang dynasty official (610–662)

Lai Ji (Chinese: 來濟; 610–662), noble title Marquess of Nanyang County (南陽縣侯), was a Chinese military general and politician of the Tang dynasty, serving as a chancellor during the reign of Emperor Gaozong. He later offended Emperor Gaozong by opposing the ascension of Emperor Gaozong's second wife Empress Wu (later known as Wu Zetian) and was exiled to be a prefect in the Western Regions. In 662, he died in battle while defending his prefecture against an attack by the Western Turkic Khaganate. His brother Lai Heng also served as a chancellor during Emperor Gaozong's reign.

== Early life ==
Lai Ji's family was from Jiangdu (江都, in modern Yangzhou, Jiangsu). His father Lai Hu'er (來護兒) was a major general during the Sui dynasty and carried the title of Duke of Rong. In 618, while Emperor Yang of Sui was at Jiangdu with the Sui state engulfed in agrarian rebellions, the general Yuwen Huaji led a coup and overthrew Emperor Yang. Yuwen executed a large number of high level officials, and Lai Hu'er, along with most of his family, was killed. Only Lai Ji and his older brother Lai Heng escaped death.

It was said that Lai Ji, because his family had suffered such disaster and he had himself escaped many dangers, was particularly studious. He was said to be a good writer and good at rhetoric and analyzing situations. He did well in imperial examinations and was able to become an imperial official.

== During Emperor Taizong's reign ==
As of 643, during the reign of the Tang dynasty's second emperor Emperor Taizong, Lai Ji was serving as a low level official at the legislative bureau of government (中書省, Zhongshu Sheng). That year, Emperor Taizong's son and crown prince Li Chengqian was discovered to have plotted to overthrow Emperor Taizong, and Emperor Taizong requested opinions from his officials as to what to do with Li Chengqian. No one dared to speak up, but Lai said, "The best possible outcome is that Your Imperial Majesty can remain a kind father and that the Crown Prince can live out his years." Emperor Taizong agreed, and he deposed Li Chengqian to commoner rank but spared Li Chengqian's life. In 644, after Emperor Taizong had created another son, Li Zhi, to be the new crown prince, he could not find an appropriate person to serve the role of brainstormer for Li Zhi, and so he commissioned Lai. Lai was also made a scholar at the imperial think tank, Chongxian Pavilion (崇賢館). He was soon made a mid-level official at the legislative bureau and commissioned to edit the Book of Jin—the official history of the Jin dynasty—with Linhu Defen (令狐德棻).

== During Emperor Gaozong's reign ==
In 649, Emperor Taizong died and was succeeded by Li Zhi (as Emperor Gaozong). In 651, Lai Ji was made Zhongshu Shilang (中書侍郎), the deputy head of the legislative bureau, and he became an official in charge of editing the imperial history. In 653, he was given the designation of Tong Zhongshu Menxia Sanpin (同中書門下三品), making him a chancellor de facto. In 654, he was further given the honorific title of Yinqing Guanglu Daifu (銀青光祿大夫) and, for his contributions in editing the histories, created the Baron of Nanyang. In 655, he was made Zhongshu Ling (中書令), the head of the legislative bureau and a post considered one for a chancellor, as well as the acting minister of civil service.

At that time, Emperor Gaozong, who greatly favored his concubine Consort Wu, was considering deposing his wife Empress Wang and replacing her with Consort Wu. He first considered creating Consort Wu the unprecedented title of Chenfei (宸妃), but Lai and fellow chancellor Han Yuan opposed the move on the basis that the title was unprecedented, so Emperor Gaozong relented. However, in 655, he, over the explicit opposition of Lai, Han, and the highly regarded chancellor Chu Suiliang, as well as the implicit disapproval by his own powerful uncle Zhangsun Wuji, deposed Empress Wang and replaced her with Consort Wu. After Empress Wu's ascension, she submitted a petition ostensibly praising the faithfulness of Han and Lai in opposing the unprecedented Chenfei title, but showing instead that she remembered that they had offended her.

In 656, after Empress Wu's son Li Hong was created crown prince (displacing Emperor Gaozong's oldest son Li Zhong, whose mother Consort Liu was of low birth), Lai was made a junior advisor to the young crown prince, and his title was upgraded to that of a marquess. In 657, however, with Empress Wu and her allies Xu Jingzong and Li Yifu beginning to carry out a series of reprisals against officials who had opposed Empress Wu's ascension, Xu and Li falsely accused Han and Lai of encouraging Chu (who by that point had been demoted to the post of commandant at Gui Prefecture (桂州, roughly modern Guilin, Guangxi)) to rebel. Emperor Gaozong demoted both Han and Lai to be prefects of distant prefectures—in Lai's case, the prefect of Tai Prefecture (台州, roughly modern Taizhou, Zhejiang) -- and ordered that they be permanently barred from returning to the capital Chang'an. However, he was able to escape further reprisals in 659, when by Empress Wu's instigations Zhangsun was forced to commit suicide and Empress Wang's uncle Liu Shi was executed. (Han would have suffered the same fate as Liu, but he already died before the executioners arrived.) In 660, though, Lai's post was moved to the even more distant Ting Prefecture (庭州, roughly modern Changji Hui Autonomous Prefecture, Xinjiang), on the borders with Western Tujue.

In 661, Western Tujue forces attacked Ting Prefecture. Lai gathered his forces to resist, and he told his subordinates, "I should have been executed a long time ago, and it is fortunate that I was spared. This is the time that I should sacrifice my body for the empire." He therefore engaged Western Tujue forces without wearing armor, and he was killed in battle. He was posthumously honored, and his casket was returned to his home territory to be buried.
