= Ŭlchi Mundŏk =

7th-century Goguryeo general

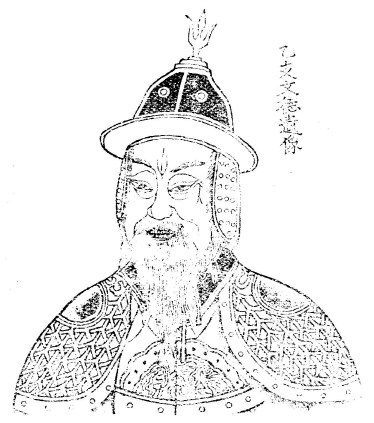

Korean name
- Hangul: 을지문덕
- Hanja: 乙支文德
- RR: Eulji Mundeok
- MR: Ŭlchi Mundŏk

Ŭlchi Mundŏk (Korean: 을지문덕; Hanja: 乙支文德) was a military leader of early 7th century Goguryeo, one of the Three Kingdoms of Korea, who successfully defended Goguryeo against Sui China. He is famous for his victory at Salsu, and is often numbered among the greatest heroes in the military history of Korea.

== Background ==
Ŭlchi Mundŏk was born in the mid-6th century and died sometime after 618, although the exact date is unknown. Haedong Myŏngjangjŏn (해동명장전; 海東名將傳), known as the "Biographies of Famed Korean Generals", written in the 18th century, states that he was from Seokda Mountain (石多山) near Pyongyang. At the time of his birth, Goguryeo was a powerful state, frequently at war with its neighbors.

In 589, the Sui dynasty conquered several surrounding states and launched several large military campaigns against Goguryeo, which was unwilling to submit to its dominance.

Ŭlchi Mundŏk was a cultured man, skilled in both the martial and literary arts. He eventually rose to become the supreme commander of Goguryeo. The name Ŭlchi may actually be a Goguryeo title.

There is a theory that Ŭlchi Mundŏk was originally of Xianbei origin.

== The Battle of Salsu River ==
After the founding of Sui in 589, a precarious peace was maintained for several years between the new Chinese dynasty and Goguryeo. However, in 597, Yeongyang launched an attack on the Sui at the Battle of Linyuguan. In response, Sui invaded Goguryeo, but the invasion was defeated due to constant ambushes and unfavorable weather.

In the early 7th century, Emperor Yang learned of a secret correspondence between Goguryeo and the Eastern Turkic Khaganate. Emperor Yang demanded Yeongyang come and submit personally to him or face an "imperial tour of his territories". When Yeongyang failed to do so, Emperor Yang prepared for war. He mustered an army of over 1,133,000 troops and more than 2 million auxiliaries and personally led them against Goguryeo in 612. The Sui army quickly overran Goguryeo's border defenses, then camped on the banks of the Liao River and prepared to bridge it.

Ŭlchi Mundŏk, commissioned as the Field Marshal, was called upon to defend the nation. He prepared his troops to meet the numerically superior Sui forces with a strategy of deception, using feigned retreats and sudden attacks. After the Sui forces crossed the Liao River, a small contingent was sent to attack the city of Yodong, but was repulsed by Ŭlchi Mundŏk's forces. As the rainy season progressed, the Sui forces launched other small probing attacks, but held off from making any large moves before the end of the rainy season.

When the rains stopped, Emperor Yang moved his forces to the banks of the Yalu River in northwestern Korea and prepared for a major battle. Fighting only small engagements at times and places of his choosing, Ŭlchi Mundŏk drew the Sui forces further and further from their supply centers. Emperor Yang sent an advance force of over 305,000 troops to take the city of Pyongyang. After allowing the force to approach the city, Field Marshal Ŭlchi Mundŏk ambushed it. His forces attacked from all sides, driving the Sui troops back in utter confusion. His troops pursued the retreating army, slaughtering them at will. Records claim that only 2,800 men of the massive force returned alive to the main Chinese army. This battle, the Battle of Salsu, came to be known as one of the most glorious military triumphs in Korea's national history.

After the battle, winter began to set in and the Sui forces, short on provisions, were forced to return home in defeat.

== Death ==
It is not known when Ŭlchi Mundŏk died. His name is not attested to after 613.

The Sui dynasty was beginning to disintegrate and Emperor Yang decided that he urgently needed to expand his empire in order to regain power, but two more attacks on Goguryeo in the following spring were met with similar disasters, and eventually internal rebellion in China forced him to abandon his desire for Goguryeo. By 618, the relatively short-lived Sui dynasty was replaced by the Tang dynasty. Field Marshal Ŭlchi Mundŏk's strategy and leadership had protected Goguryeo from Chinese expansion into the Korean peninsula.

== Legacy ==
One of the most distinguished military leaders of the Goguryeo period, Ŭlchi Mundŏk's leadership and tactical acumen were the decisive factors in defeating the Sui invasion. Facing numerically superior forces, he developed a strategy that allowed him to secure a decisive victory. Such brilliant tactical success earned him a permanent place among Korea's most famous leaders. Kim Pusik, the author of the Samguk Sagi, also attributed the victory over Sui to Ŭlchi Mundŏk.

In Korea, Ŭlchi Mundŏk is recognized as one of the greatest figures in its national history. During the reign of Hyeonjong in the Goryeo period, a shrine to Ŭlchi Mundŏk was built near Pyongyang. In the succeeding Joseon period, he remained just as revered a figure. Yang Seong-ji, a scholar and high-ranking bureaucrat of 15th century Joseon, and An Jeong-bok, a Silhak historian of 18th century Joseon, both thought highly of him. Furthermore, King Sukjong ordered the construction of another shrine in honor of Ŭlchi Mundŏk in 1680.

At a time when Korea was suffering under the yoke of Japanese imperialism, a fuller assessment of Ŭlchi Mundŏk was commenced by the Korean historian Shin Chaeho, who published a biography of the famed general in 1908 and held him out as an example of Korea's traditional nationalist spirit. Ŭlchi Mundŏk is still celebrated as a national hero. One of the most preeminent Korean scholars of the 20th century, Lee Ki-baik, noted that Ŭlchi Mundŏk's efforts in halting the Sui attempt at conquest stand as one of the earliest examples of Korean attempts to fend off foreign domination.

In South Korea, a main thoroughfare in downtown Seoul, Euljiro, is named after Ŭlchi Mundŏk.

The second highest military decoration of South Korea is named after Ŭlchi Mundŏk.

The Republic of Korea Navy named a Gwanggaeto the Great-class destroyer in honor of Ŭlchi Mundŏk.

Ŭlchi Mundŏk's literary work, the Ŭlchi Mundŏk hansi, is one of the oldest surviving poems in Korean literature.

One of the biannual Combined Forces Command exercises between South Korea and the United States was called Ulchi-Focus Lens (UFL) in honor of Ŭlchi Mundŏk. It was renamed to Ulchi-Freedom Guardian (UFG) in 2015. UFG is the world's largest computerized command and control exercise, focusing on how US and ROK forces would defend against a North Korean attack.

== Portrayals ==
Ŭlchi Mundŏk is played by Lee Jung-gil in the 2006–2007 SBS TV series Yeon Gaesomun.

Preceded by Yŏn T'aejo	Magniji of Goguryeo ? – ?	Succeeded by Eventually Yŏn Kaesomun
