= Lai Heng =

Lai Heng (Chinese: 來恆; died November 18, 678) was an official of the Tang dynasty of China, serving as chancellor during the reign of the Emperor Gaozong. He was the older brother of Lai Ji, who was also chancellor.

== Background ==
Lai Heng's family was from Jiangdu (江都, in modern Yangzhou, Jiangsu). His father Lai Hu'er (來護兒) was a major general during the Sui dynasty and carried the title of Duke of Rong. In 618, while Emperor Yang of Sui was at Jiangdu with the Sui state engulfed in agrarian rebellions, the general Yuwen Huaji led a coup and overthrew Emperor Yang. Yuwen executed a large number of high level officials, and Lai Hu'er, along with most of his family, was killed. Only Lai Heng and his younger brother Lai Ji escaped death.

== During Emperor Gaozong's reign ==
Both Lai Heng and Lai Ji were said to be talented in literature, and their reputations were said to be equivalent—although much more is known about Lai Ji's career than Lai Heng's, due to Lai Ji's famed opposition to the ascension of Emperor Gaozong of Tang's second wife Empress Wu (later known as Wu Zetian) in 655, when Lai Ji was already chancellor. (For his opposition to Empress Wu, Lai Ji would eventually be exiled and die in exile in 662.)

What is known about Lai Heng's career was that as of 676, he was serving as Huangmen Shilang (黃門侍郎), the deputy head of the examination bureau of government (門下省, Menxia Sheng), when he was given the designation of Tong Zhongshu Menxia Sanpin (同中書門下三品), making him a chancellor de facto. However, his acts as chancellor were not recorded in history. He died in 678, while still serving as chancellor.
