= BJ Kang =

American FBI special agent

BJ Kang is a former American Federal Bureau of Investigation special agent known for high-profile investigations of securities fraud. After leading the perp walk of Bernie Madoff in 2008 and Raj Rajaratnam in 2009, Reuters described him as possibly "the most feared man on Wall Street."

== Career ==
Kang was an accountant before becoming an FBI agent. He started as an investigator in many types of cases before focusing on insider trading in 2006.

Kang was the lead investigator in the insider trading case against Raj Rajaratnam. In a Newsweek interview Rajaratnam says that when he was arrested, Kang taunted him by telling him: “Take a good look at your son. You’re not going to see him for a long time. Your wife doesn’t seem so upset. Because she’s going to spend all your money.”

He led the investigation into insider trading at S.A.C. Capital Advisors in 2011, concentrating efforts on arresting Mathew Martoma and attempting to get him to flip on S.A.C. Capital head Steve Cohen. By 2012, he would move on from New York to the Washington office, sparking some concern that his departure along with two other key investigation and prosecution team members would cause the insider trading cases pursued by the FBI to falter.

In 2022, he joined Binance as Head of Investigations.
