= Kang We-suck =

South Korean activist (born 1986)

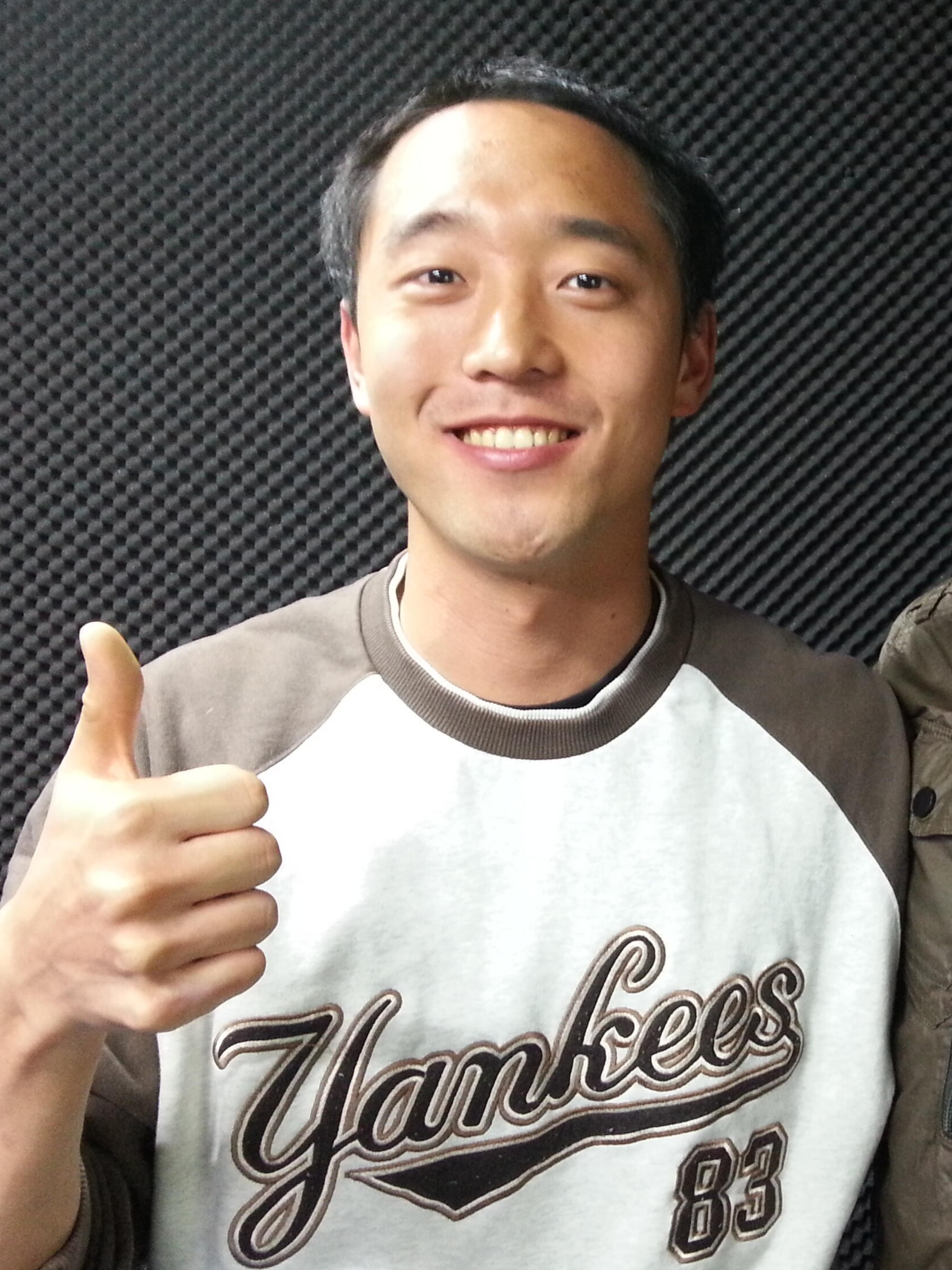
- Kang We-suck in 2013
- Born: 25 August 1986 (age 40); Dongdaemun, Seoul, South Korea
- Occupation: Anti-war activist
- Father: Kang Chae-chung

Korean name
- Hangul: 강의석
- Hanja: 姜義錫
- RR: Gang Uiseok
- MR: Kang Ŭisŏk

Kang We-suck (Korean: 강의석, born 25 August 1986) is a South Korean and activist for civil and human rights activist who promotes pacifism. Kang's activism in civil rights (religious and political freedoms) began in 2003 when he was a student. Kang went on a hunger strike from 11 August to 25 September and from 16 October to 25 October 2004. In 2008, Kang joined a peace movement and in August 2008, staged a naked protest at the Armed Forces Day of South Korea. In 2011, Kang became a conscientious objector.

== Biography ==
Kang was born in Dongdaemun in Seoul, South Korea. He was educated at the Sungil middle school and the Daekwang high school. Kang was enrolled in the Seoul National University school of law from March 2005 to 2007 but did not complete his studies.

== Student activism ==
In 2004, Kang refused to attend his high school chapel services, preferring private worship. On 8 July 2004, Kang was expelled. From 11 August to 25 September 2004, Kang went on an hunger strike, receiving support from some teachers, civic groups and 32 congressmen. Kang returned to school in October 2004 but held a further hunger strike from 17 to 21 October. This won religious rights for students and in taking legal action against his school and the government of Seoul Kang was compensated.

As a student of law, Kang promoted the rights of student minorities and on 1 October 2008, made a nude protest against compulsory military service at the 60th Armed Forces Day anniversary parade on Teheran road, Samseong-dongin, Seoul. He ran naked into the parade carrying a gun shaped cookie. He blew on the cookie before eating it. He said,

"Being nude is a symbol of peace and disarmament. It represents being actively involved in a nonviolent movement for peace. The distribution of gun-shaped cookies implies that a world without arms is sweet and peace is delicious...It would only cost $1.5 trillion to solve worldwide poverty and cure all diseases. We are spending over $1.7 trillion in Korea for our military budget. It caused the killing of innocent citizens in Geochang, Gwangju, and Jeju, and the overthrow of the democratic government of Korea at the same time. Recent military actions include depriving citizens of their homes and taking violent action against candlelit rallies...First I thought recruiting soldiers could be okay. But later I thought we do not need a military system at all."

Kang was detained by police and taken to Suseo police station.

=== Conscientious objector ===
In December 2010, Kang received a notice to appear for military duty from the Military Manpower Administration. He refused to attend and was charged with refusing to perform mandatory military duty. Kang commented,

"Whatever ruling the court comes out with, I have no plan to appeal the decision to a higher court. If it rules against me, I will go to prison and do my time. I think it is worthwhile contemplating what I am going to do after serving my sentence, rather than wasting time by filing an appeal to a higher court...I would like to spend my time in a productive manner. From now on, I will only think about what I am going to do after getting out of jail."

Kwon Ki-moon, a judge of the Seoul central district court sentenced Kang to eighteen months in prison for violating the conscription law. Kang was taken to prison immediately after the ruling with his mother watching in the courtroom. The judge said,

"With the military confrontation between the two Koreas in place, the freedom of conscience can be restricted for the sake of national security.

In 2008, Kang was fined ₩6,000,000 for his participation in illegal demonstrations and engaging in actions such as climbing on a police bus or stepping on the shoulders and heads of police officers.

== Prison activist ==
On 14 September and 27 January 2011, Kang began periods of hunger strike of seven days to promote the rights of prisoners. His efforts were interrupted on 8 February 2011 by fainting and hospital admissions.

== See also ==
- Human right
- Pacifism
- Conscription
- Hunger strike

== Bibliography ==
- CO Kang We-suck's infamous letter to Olympic medalist Park Tae-hwan. Coin Korea movie blog. September 2008.
- SNU Student campaigns against two taboos. The Korea Times 11 July 2008.
- Two conscientious objectors convicted. The Korea Times 2 June 2007.
- 대광고 강의석군, 퇴학에서 승소까지 국민일보 23 April 2010. (in Korean)
- Two conscientious objectors convicted The Korea Times 11 June 2011.
- 대광고 종교교육 강요 맞선 강의석군 1심 승소 서울신문 Seoul news 11 October 2007. 23면 (in Korean)
- 강의석, 구치소서 '단식투쟁' 하다 쓰러져 한겨레신문 년 월 일자 Hani website 9 February 2009.
- 대광고 강의석군, 학교 '거짓말'에 재차 단식 프레시안 Pressian website 18 October 2004.
- Court rules against religion class denial. The Korea Times 9 May 2008.
- Religious freedom in schools The Korea Times 1 May 2013.
- Religious freedom The Korea Times April 2010.
