= Kang Dong-suk (adventurer) =

South Korean Adventurer

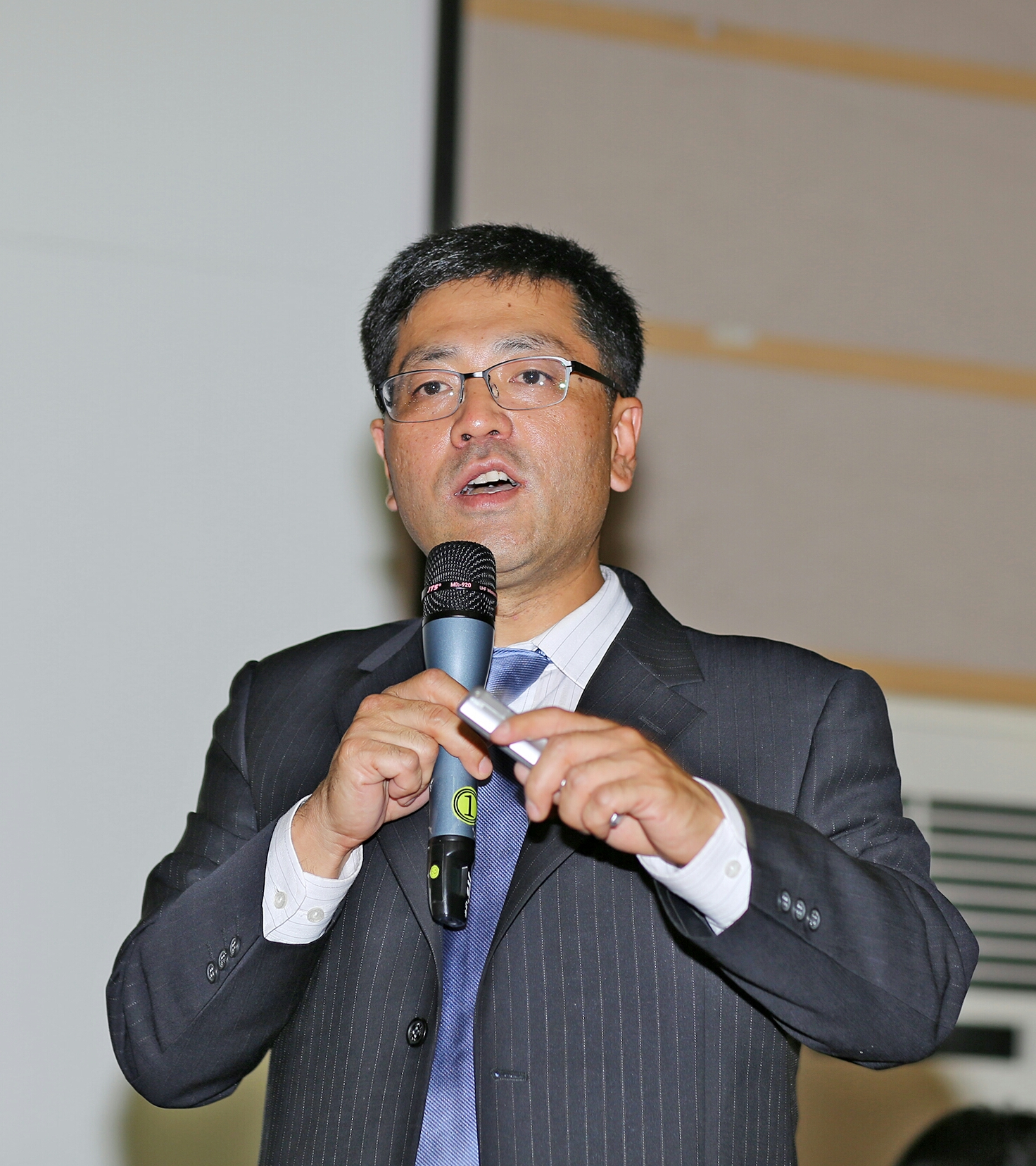
- Kang in 2014
- Born: Kang Dong-suk; 25 May 1969 (age 57); Hapcheon, South Korea
- Other name: Donald Kang
- Occupation: Yachtsman
- Known for: First Korean to complete a solo circumnavigation of the globe in a yacht

Korean name
- Hangul: 강동석
- Hanja: 姜東錫
- RR: Gang Dongseok
- MR: Kang Tongsŏk
- Website: donaldkang.com

Kang Dong-suk (Korean: 강동석; born 25 May 1969; a.k.a. Donald Kang) is a yachtsman and adventurer from South Korea.

On 8 June 1997, he became the first Korean to sail around the world single-handedly, when he completed a circumnavigation on a 30-foot (9.2-meter) sailboat Pioneer 2 (선구자 2), covering over 70,000 kilometers in 3 years and 5 months. In 1991, he completed the first single-handed sailing voyage of the Pacific by a Korean in his first sailboat Pioneer 1 (선구자 1), a 29-foot (8.7-meter) boat, travelling the distance of 11,700 kilometers in 7 months. After arriving in Korea, he donated the Pioneer 1 to the Korea Naval Academy.

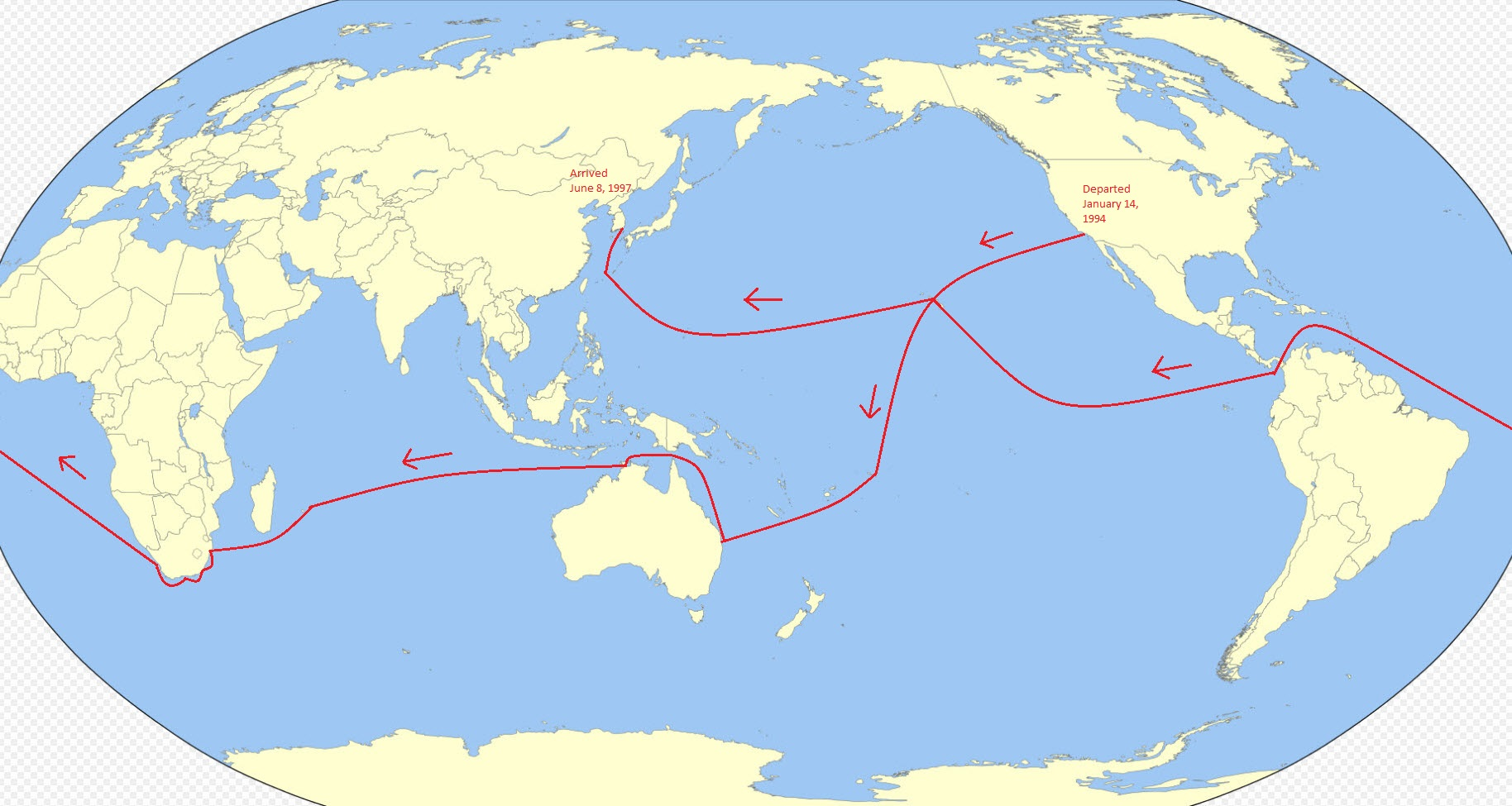
Circumnavigation route of Pioneer 2

The Republic of Korea Navy, in recognition of Kang's sailing achievements, awarded him the first ever Honorary Member of the Republic of Korea Navy (명예해군) title. In November 1997, following his return from the sailing solo-circumnavigation, South Korean President Kim Young-sam invited Kang to the Blue House and awarded him the "New Korean" (신한국인) title.

In 1999, as a member of a Korean climbing team, he attempted to summit Broad Peak in the Himalayas, the 12th highest mountain in the world. The team had to turn back when a climbing member fell to his death.

After his return from the Himalayas, Kang graduated from UCLA and worked at Deloitte as a public accountant. In 2005, Kang served as the expedition manager for the Korean mountaineer Park Young-seok's North Pole expedition, supporting Park achieve an Explorers Grand Slam. Park became the first person to climb all 14 Eight-thousanders and achieve the Explorers Grand Slam.

Kang chronicled his sailing adventures in his book Yes I am passionate about the sea. He also gives frequent lectures about his experience and expeditions. Sailboats (Pioneers 1 and 2) used by Kang for his sailing voyages are on display at the Korea Naval Academy and the Korea National Maritime Museum. Kang currently resides in the San Francisco Bay Area, working as an accountant.

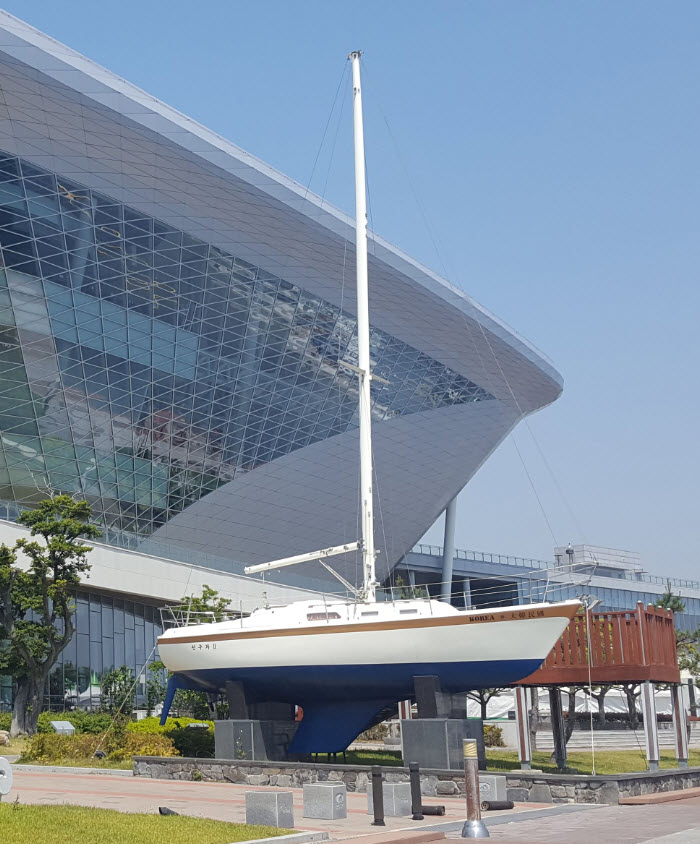
Pioneer 2 on display at the Korea National Maritime Museum

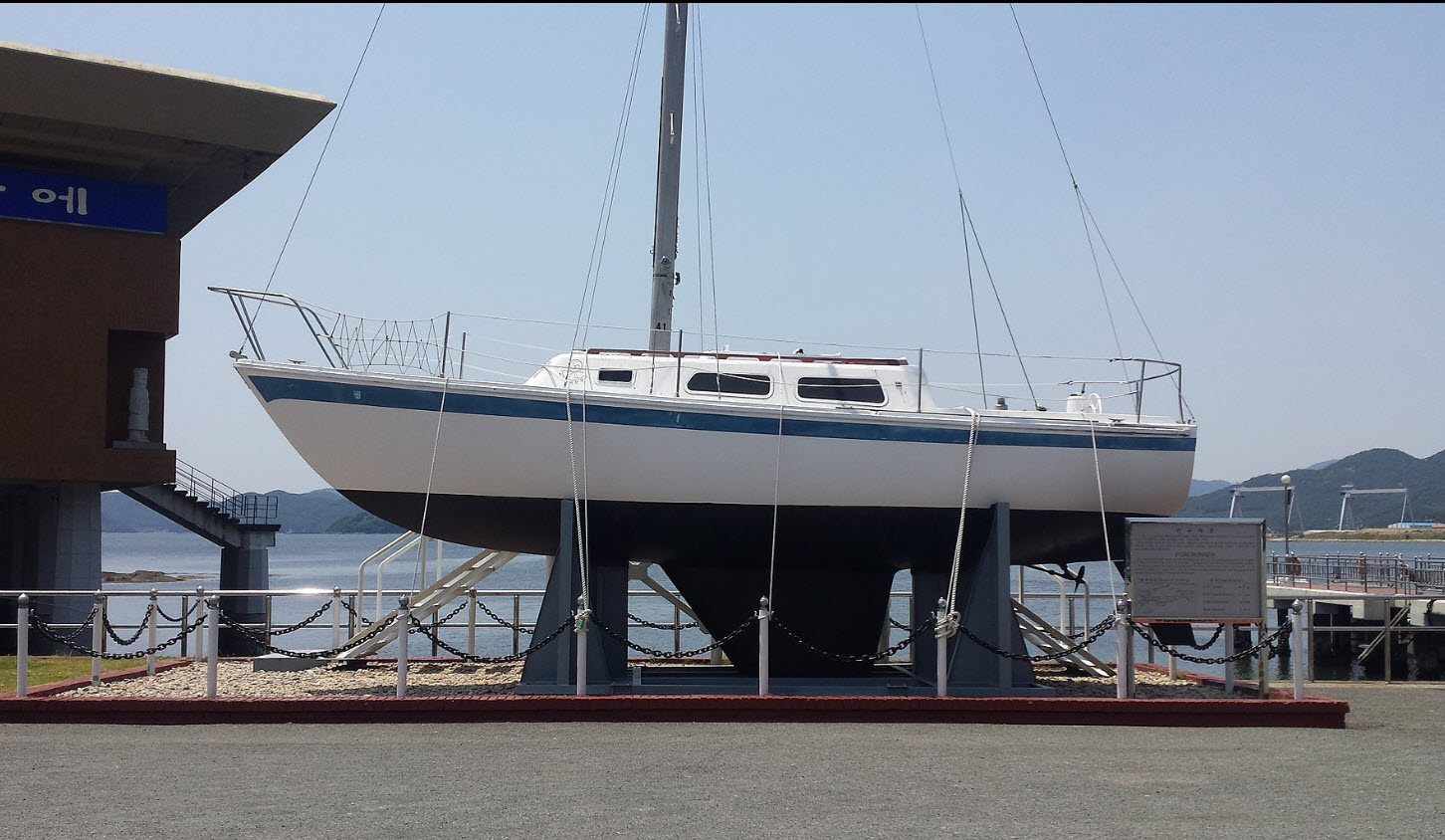
Pioneer 1 on display at the Korea Naval Academy

== Notable expeditions ==
Years	Adventures
1990-1991	Single-handed crossing of the Pacific
1994-1997	Single-handed circumnavigation
1999	Broad Peak climbing expedition - 12th highest mountain in the world
2005	North Pole expedition

== Books ==
- 인생은 탐험이다 Life is Exploration 2022
- 그래 나는 바다에 미쳤다 Yes, I am passionate about the sea 1997

== Recognitions ==
Year	Awards
1991	Honorary Member of the Republic of Korea Navy, 1st
1997	Presidential Award - New Korean (Awarded by South Korean President Kim Young-Sam)
1997	Honorary Citizen - City of Busan
1997	Korea Sea Scouts Jang Bo-go Award
2014	Goodwill Ambassador for Korea National Maritime Museum
2023	Goodwill Ambassador for Sancheong Expo
2023	Honorary Captain of Korea Maritime and Ocean University, 3rd
