= Kang Hwan-seug =

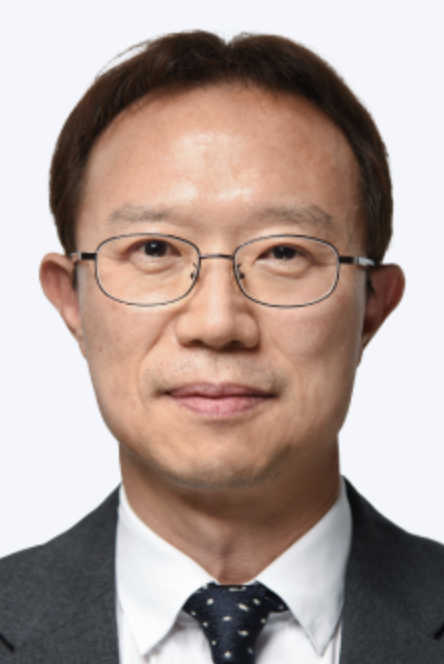
- Official portrait

Vice Minister of the Defense Acquisition Program Administration
- In office 23 September 2022 – 27 January 2026
- President: Yoon Suk Yeol; Lee Jae Myung
- Minister: Eom Dong-hwan; Seok Jong-gun; Lee Yong-cheol
- Succeeded by: Kim Il-dong

Personal details
- Children: 1 daughter
- Education: University of Missouri

Kang Hwan-seug (Korean: 강환석) is a South Korean bureaucrat, who has served as the Vice Minister of the Defense Acquisition Program Administration since 23 September 2023.

== Personal life and education ==
Kang earned a master's degree in law from the University of Missouri in 2014. He lives in Seoul with his wife and daughter.

== Career ==
Kang spoke at the 2023 Korean Economic Forum nothing that persistent tensions with North Korea have allowed South Korea to build up a stable mass production system as well as operational experiences allows Korea to deliver quality weapons on time.
On May 27, 2024, Kang made the opening remarks at the Roundtable on Korea-Canada Defence Cooperation where he emphasized the importance of the implementation of Canada's Indo-Pacific strategy.
