= Kang Hwagil =

South Korean writer

- 강화길
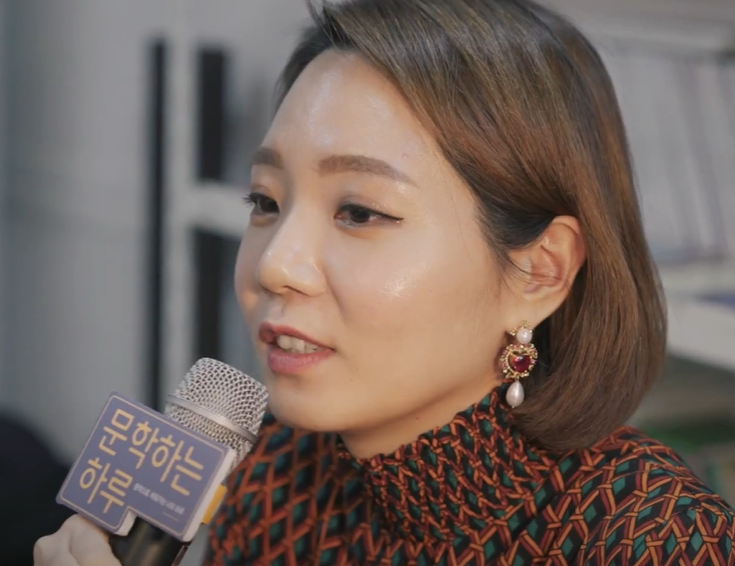
- Kang Hwagil in 2018.
- Born: 1986 (age 39–40); Jeonju, North Jeolla Province
- Education: Bachelor's degree in Korean Language and Literature, Jeonbuk National University; Master's degree in Narrative Creation, Korea National University of Arts; Doctorate in Korean language and Literature, Dongguk University
- Occupations: Writer, feminist
- Writing career
- Language: Korean
- Period: 2012-

Korean name
- Hangul: 강화길
- Hanja: 姜禾吉
- RR: Gang Hwagil
- MR: Kang Hwagil

Kang Hwagil (Korean: 강화길, born 1986) is a South Korean writer and feminist who writes primarily about women, often using unreliable narrators. Her writing is influenced by gothic romance and thrillers written by women in the 19th century. She is a recipient of the Munhakdongne Young Writers’ Award (2017) and the Hankyoreh Literary Award (2017).

== Life ==
Kang Hwagil was born in Jeonju, North Jeolla Province, South Korea, in 1986. As an introverted child, she enjoyed reading, and entered multiple writing contests as a teenager. She attended Jeonbuk National University, and was active in a literary review club she joined due to her frustration with the lack of available creative writing classes. After taking a semester off from university to focus on writing, she graduated with a degree in Korean literature, and enrolled in a graduate program for writing at the Korea National University of Arts.

Her literary debut was in 2012 with the short story "Room" (방, "Bang").

== Writing ==
Kang Hwagil was influenced by the works of 19th-century Western women writers, including the Brontë sisters and Mary Shelley, and has described herself as being particularly interested in gothic romance and thriller narratives. Her fiction often pays homage to the typical style and atmosphere found in mysteries and thrillers. Kang has expressed her admiration for the works of Shirley Jackson in particular, even quoting her in the afterword for A Good Person (괜찮은 사람, 2016). The quote was from a time when Jackson was being emotionally abused by her husband, connecting the themes of women's liberation to Kang's book.

Kang's writing typically involves unreliable narration, along with other techniques used to create an environment of anxiety and fear. Since the majority of Kang's protagonists are women, the situations they experience tend to be real-life events women encounter.

=== Young Feminists ===
Kang Hwagil is part of a group of younger Korean women writers known as "Young Feminists", born in the 1990s or 2000s, in contrast to the previous generation of Korean women writers. The primary difference between the two generations is in regards to the portrayal of women in their stories; while the previous generation would typically allude to violence against women in their writing, the younger generation explicitly portrays women as political agents, actively fighting against violence against women through their literature. Apart from Kang, other "Young Feminists" include the writers Choi Eunyoung, Cho Nam-ju, and Park Min-jung.

Kang's writing consistently about women's issues have resulted in her being described as a feminist writer, particularly in regards to stories such as A Good Person (괜찮은 사람, 2016) and A Different Person (다른 사람, 2017). Kang has stated that, although she feels women's issues are important and that she is obligated to write about them, she is careful not to make them the sole focus of her work, explaining that many people have warned her since her debut about the possibility of being stereotyped as a female writer who writes only about women. Kang, however, believes that self-regulation or self-censorship out of fear of being stereotyped as such will only result in limiting the discussion of women's issues to "personal problems".

== Works ==
=== Works in Korean ===
Short story collections

- A Good Person (괜찮은 사람, 2016) ISBN 978-8-954-64302-3
- We Loved (우리는 사랑했다, 2018) ISBN 979-1-155-35135-2

Novels

- A Different Person (다른 사람, 2017) ISBN 979-1-160-40093-9, English translation Another Person, Claire Richards, 2023, Pushkin Press, London, ISBN 9781782279358

Short stories

- "Room" (방, 2012)
- "A Good Person" (괜찮은 사람)
- "Nikola Kindergarten - A Precious Person (니꼴라 유치원-귀한 사람)
- "Lake - Other People" (호수-다른 사람)
- "Demon" (손)
- "Seo-u" (서우, 2018)

In anthologies

- "Imperial Princess" (황녀), in Everyday We (우리는 날마다, 2018) ISBN 979-1-196-00816-1
- "Camila" (카밀라), in Don't Stop Loving (사랑을 멈추지 말아요, 2018) ISBN 979-1-196-43811-1
- "Not Forgotten, Even in Dreams" (꿈엔들 잊힐 리야), in Melancholy Happy Ending (멜랑콜리 해피엔딩, 2019) ISBN 979-1-160-26127-1

=== Works in English ===
- Seo-u (서우) (ASIA Publishers, 2018), translated by Stella Kim ISBN 979-1-156-62376-2
- Demons (손) (Strangers Press, 2019), translated by Mattho Mandersloot ISBN 978-1-911-34364-6

== Awards ==
- Munhakdongne Young Writers’ Award (2017)
- Hankyoreh Literary Award (2017) (for Dareun saram)
- Ku Sang Literature Prize for Young Writers (2018) (for Seo-u)
