= Zhou Luohou =

Chinese general and administrator (542-605)

Zhou Luohou (Chinese: 周羅㬋, 542–605), courtesy name Gongbu (公布), was a Chinese general and administrator serving under the Chen and Sui dynasties. He died in the battles against Yang Liang's rebel remnants. His posthumous name was Zhuang (壯, "strong").

== During the Liang dynasty ==
Zhou Luohou's ancestral home was Xunyang (潯陽) in Jiujiang. His father Zhou Fahao (周法暠) was a general under the Liang dynasty. When he was a teenager, Zhou Luohou was good at riding and archery and lived a free and unrestrained life. He hunted with dogs and eagles, and he played military games with other daredevils he gathered around him. His grandfather's brother warned him to mend his ways, but Zhou Luohou never changed.

== During the Chen dynasty ==
During the Chen dynasty, Zhou Luohou distinguished himself in battles and received the title Kaiyuan General (開遠將軍). During Emperor Xuan's reign (569–582) he governed Jurong. In the war against Northern Qi of 573, Zhou Luohou fought under General Wu Mingche in Jiangyang (江陽, modern Yangzhou), when an arrow struck him in his left eye. He continued to fight in the war, and when Wu Mingche was surrounded by Northern Qi troops in Suyu (宿預, modern Suqian), Zhou Luohou and his subordinate Xiao Mohe bravely fought off and routed the enemy. After they took Xuzhou, the Chen army engaged the Northern Zhou army under Liang Shiyan (梁士彥). Xiao Mohe fell from his horse in the battle but Zhou Luohou rushed forward and saved him. When the war ended, Zhou Luohou received the title Guangyuan General (光遠將軍) and governed Zhongli Commandery (modern Fengyang County).

In 579, Zhou Luohou became a Commissioner with Extraordinary Powers (使持節) and put in charge of military affairs in Huo Prefecture (霍州, modern Huoshan County). After he quashed rebels in twelve mountainous regions, he received the titles General of the Right Army (右軍將軍) and Duke of Shi'an County (始安縣伯), which entitled him to land taxes of four hundred families. He was assigned to Yang Prefecture as its Area Commander-in-Chief. He received three thousand taels of gold and silver which he distributed to his soldiers and warriors. Next, he was promoted to Governor of Jinling Commandery and became a marquis. His tax entitlement was increased to a thousand families, and soon to 1600 families after he became Chief Minister of the Court of the Imperial Stud. Later, he received the title of Xiongxin General (雄信將軍) and was tasked with the military affairs of ten commanderies around Yuzhang (modern Nanchang). He oversaw many trials personally and won the support of his populace.

After Chen Shubao took the throne in 582, Zhou Luohou commanded the military in Jing Province. A minor official called Wu Shixing (吳世興) submitted a secret memorial which cautioned against Zhou's increasing influence away from the capital. Chen Shubao was alarmed, but both Xiao Mohe and Lu Guangda (魯廣達) vouched for Zhou. When the news reached him, Zhou Luohou rebuked the advice to rebel, and he traveled to Jiankang and re-gained the emperor's trust. He was honored with the title Left Defense Commander for the Crown Prince (太子左衛率). At the banquet, Chen Shubao learned that Zhou was a great poet, which pleased him. Soon, Zhou was honored the Cavalier Attendant-in-Ordinary (散騎常侍) and took over military affairs in Xiang Province.

In 588, during the Sui invasion of Chen, Zhou Luohou successfully defended the Three Gorges and the Middle Yangtze against the Sui general Yang Jun. However, another Sui army under Yang Guang captured Jiankang and Chen Shubao in 589. When Chen Shubao's handwritten letter arrived, Zhou allegedly "wept deeply for three days" before he disbanded his army and surrendered.

== During the Sui dynasty ==
Emperor Wen of Sui valued Zhou Luohou and promised him wealth when they first met. The victorious Sui general He Ruobi (賀若弼) made a snide comment regarding Zhou's abilities, but Zhou talked right back to him, saying that the outcome would be doubtful if they went head-to-head. That autumn, Zhou received the honorary title yi tong sansi (儀同三司, "Prestige equal to Three Offices") in a pompous ceremony. On another occasion, the Sui general Han Qinhu (韓擒虎) remarked that Zhou's former subordinate Yang Xiang (羊翔) was enjoying a higher position as a result of defecting to Sui earlier, but Zhou retorted that it was improper for a minister to endorse surrendering.

In the winter of 589, Zhou was made the Prefect of Bin Prefecture (in modern Shaanxi). He later served as the Prefect of Jing Prefecture (in modern Gansu) until his mother's death. After the filial mourning period, he was reassigned to Bin Prefecture where he enjoyed a good reputation for being competent.

In 598, the Goguryeo–Sui War began. A Sui expeditionary army of 300,000 men was hastily assembled under the prince Yang Liang, with Zhou Luohou in charge of the navy. Zhou attempted to cross the Yellow Sea from Donglai Commandery to attack Pyongyang. However, harsh storms scattered and sank many ships. The remaining ships were repelled by a Goguryeo fleet with 50,000 men. The Sui suffered heavy losses and had to withdraw.

In 599, Zhou Luohou served under Yang Su in the war against Tardu and the Western Turkic Khaganate. With Yang Su's permission, he led twenty cavalries to attack the disorganized Turkic troops, and routed the enemy after several hours of intense fighting. He was made a General-in-Chief (大將軍) following their return. In 601, he was made the Right Palace Police Commander for the Heir Apparent (東宮右虞候率) and promoted to the rank of a marquis, with an income of 1500 families' land taxes.

After Yang Guang succeeded the throne in 604, Zhou Luohou was promoted in early 605 and served under Yang Su again to defeat Yang Liang (who had rebelled against his brother Yang Guang). When he returned, Zhou Luohou asked to pay respect to his former lord Chen Shubao, who had died. The emperor agreed and even praised him. At that time, Yang Liang's rebel remnants still occupied Jin Prefecture, Jiang Prefecture, and Lü Prefecture (all in modern Shanxi), and Zhou Luohou took his army to quash them. During the battles, he was struck by a stray arrow and died. He received posthumous titles and his son Zhou Zhong'an (周仲安) was made an official.
