= Lucia Hwong =

American composer

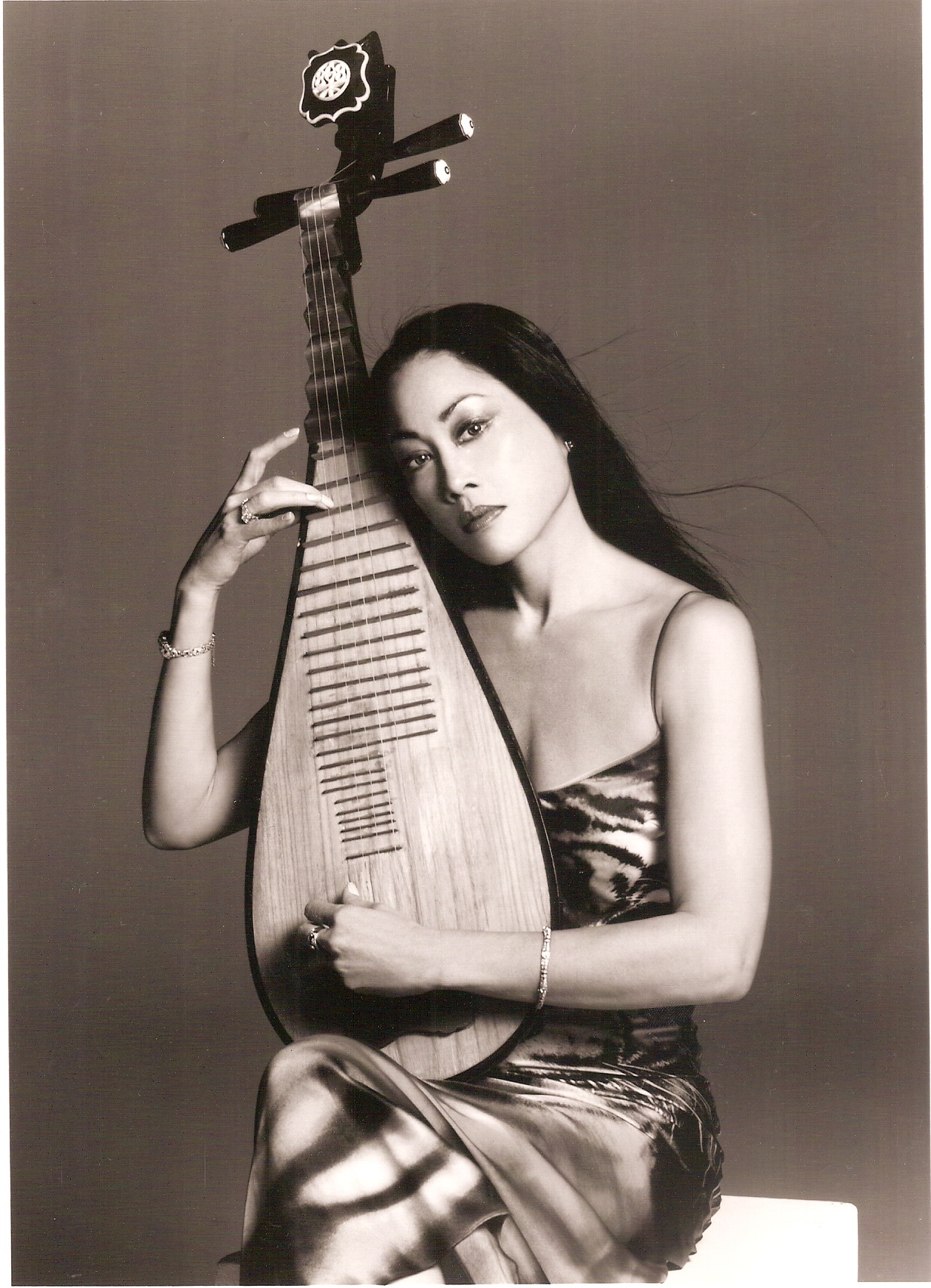
- Hwong and her Pipa (a Chinese lute), January 2012
- Born: Hawaii
- Occupation: Composer
- Mother: Lisa Lu

Lucia Hwong is an American composer and instrumentalist. She has created music for theater, film, television, dance and the concert stage.

== Biography ==
Hwong was born in Hawaii and raised in Los Angeles, California. Her grandmother was a grande dame of Chinese opera and her mother is international actress Lisa Lu. Her first public performance was in concert, playing the pipa, an ancient Chinese lute, at the age of six. She studied ethnomusicology, theater and dance at UCLA and Columbia University from 1978 to 1982, graduating with a B.A. degree cum laude in ethnomusicology.

She has chaired philanthropic events for organizations including the Women's Project, American Theatre Wing, Asia Society and Parrish Art Museum and has been on committees such as Southampton Hospital.

She was married to investment banker Peter Gordon (1942–2020), with whom she had two daughters.

== Compositions ==
Her music for theater includes the scores for the Tony Award-winning Broadway production of M. Butterfly and Tony-nominated Golden Child; as well as David Henry Hwang's New York Shakespeare Festival presentations of Sound and Beauty and The Dance and the Railroad and the Obie Award-winner FOB. She composed the music for Iago and Venus Voodoo at Lincoln Center.

Hwong also scored the Mark Taper and McCarter Theatre premieres of Anna Deavere Smith's Twilight: Los Angeles 1992 and created a 12-tone fugue for Joyce Carol Oates' The Perfectionist. Among her dance scores, Fierce Attachments debuted at the Brooklyn Academy of Music's Next Wave Festival. She also scored Ali MacGraw's Yoga Mindbody and created music for the Guggenheim Museum's Soho video wall.

Her music for television and film include Hiroshima (NBC), Vietnam War Story (HBO), Forbidden Nights (Tiananmen Square massacre) (ABC), Paper Angels (Angel Island) (PBS), Jennifer's in Jail (girl gangs) (Lifetime), Lotus (women's emancipation in China) (AFI), Who Killed Vincent Chin? (racial murder) (1998 Oscar nomination: Best Documentary) and Silverlake Life: the View from Here (AIDS), honored with Sundance Film Festival and Peabody awards.

Concert pieces include The Unwelcome and Rhythm of Your Pulse, commissioned and performed by the Women's Philharmonic.

Her two albums, House of Sleeping Beauties and Secret Luminescence were released on the Private Music label. The Goddess Trilogy CDs of new-age music were released on her own label, Goddess Music, and received a Visionary Award in 2000.

== Discography ==
Theater
Year	Production	Role	Notes
1998	Golden Child	Composer, Incidental Music	Broadway New York
1993	Twilight: Los Angeles, 1992	Composer, Arranger, Performer	McCarter Theater, Princeton, NJ
1993	The Perfectionist	Composer, Arranger, Performer	McCarter Theater, Princeton, NJ
1993	Twilight: Los Angeles, 1993	Composer, Arranger, Performer	The Mark Taper Forum, Los Angeles Music Center
1993	Snake in the Vein	Composer, Arranger, Performer	Blank Theatre Company, New York, NY
1993	The Perfectionist	Composer, Arranger, Performer	McCarter Theater, Princeton, NJ
1992	The Big One Shot	Composer, Performer	Naked Angels Theatre, New York, NY
1989	Venus Voodoo	Composer, Arranger, Performer	Lincoln Center, New York, NY
1989	M. Butterfly	Composer, Arranger	Westbury Theatre, London
1988	M. Butterfly	Composer, arranger, On-Stage Music Director	O'Neill Theatre, Broadway New York
1983	Sound and Beauty	Composer, Arranger, Performer	New York Shakespeare Festival
1981	The Dance and the Railroad	Composer, Music Director, Performer	New York Shakespeare Festival
1980	F.O.B.	Composer, Music Director, Performer	New York Shakespeare Festival
1980	Iago	Composer, Played Desdemona	Mitzi Newhouse Theater - Lincoln Center (NY);
1979	Iago	Composer, Played Desdemona	Inner City Cultural Center (LA)

Film
Year	Title	Role	Notes
2010	Giving Back	Music Score	Giving Back Foundation
1999	The Venice Project	Musician	
1993	Silverlake Life: The View from Here	Composer : Score	Sundance Film Festival
1988	The Lawless Land	Composer : Score	Roger Corman
1988	Lotus	Actress	
1987	Who Killed Vincent Chin?	Composer : Score	
1987	China Girl	Composer : Song	Vestron
1987	The Last Emperor	Actress: Featured Role Lady of the Book	
1985	Year of the Dragon	Composer : Title Music	
1984	Nothing Lasts Forever	Actress : Lunar Maiden	
1982	Hammett	Musician : Pipa; Chinese music consultant to John Barry	

Television
Year	Title	Role	Notes
1993	The World of Lucia Hwong	Composer : Score	Time Warner Cable
1991	Jennifer's in Jail	Composer : Score	Lifetime
1990	Hiroshima: Out of the Ashes	Composer : Score	NBC
1990	Forbidden Nights	Composer : Score	CBS
1989	Vietnam War Story: The Last Days	Composer : Score	HBO / The Last Soldier
1985	Paper Angels	Composer : Score	PBS/AMERICAN PLAYHOUSE

Concerts
Year	Title	Role	Notes
1996	Drum Song	Composer-Lyrics by George C. Wolfe	Boys Choir of Harlem
1991	The Unwelcome Rhythm of Your Pulse	Composer	Women’s Philharmonic San Francisco
1989	Venus Voodoo	Creator, Composer, Performer	Lincoln Center

Dance & Multimedia
Year	Title	Role	Notes
1995	Akashic Weekend	Pipa performer	Event of Ira Cohen
1994	Ali MacGraw Yoga Mind & Body	Composer : Score	M32 Music Co.
1987	Fierce Attachments	Composer : Score	BAM/Next Wave Festival

Recording
Year	Title	Role	Notes
1999	Goddess Mythical Visions Vol. 3	Composer, arranger, performer	M32 Music Co.
1998	Goddess Celestial Visions Vol. 2	Composer, arranger, performer	M32 Music Co.
1998	Goddess Awakening Visions Vol. 1	Composer, arranger, performer	M32 Music Co.
1994	Neurotransmitter Bath	Composer	M32 Music Co.
1987	Secret Luminescence	Composer, arranger, performer	Produced by Kurt Munkacsi
1987	Neo Geo	Pipa performer	Album of Ryuichi Sakamoto
1984	House of Sleeping Beauties	Composer, arranger, performer	Private Music

== Recognition ==
In 1978, Hwong received a Citation of Outstanding Contribution by the Board of Public Works of the City of Los Angeles. Time magazine (September 1986) and The New York Times (May 1986) included her in a list of America's exceptional new composers; and in 1993, she received the first Asian American Arts award from the Asian American Arts Alliance as Artist of the Year.

Composer Philip Glass wrote, "a young generation of composers has begun to appear. And the thing which distinguishes them...is that they represent...dual tradition...perhaps really for the first time, or something new. Not a borrowing from one tradition or incorporating the sounds of another, but a real blending of Eastern and Western music. Lucia Hwong is such a composer."

Hwong is on the Board of The Women's Project and was honored at its Women of Achievement Awards on March 2, 2009. Mayor Bloomberg declared the day "Women's Project Day" by Proclamation. Lucia has chaired the 21st, 22nd, and 23rd Women's Project Galas.
