= Francis Jue =

American actor and singer (born 1963)

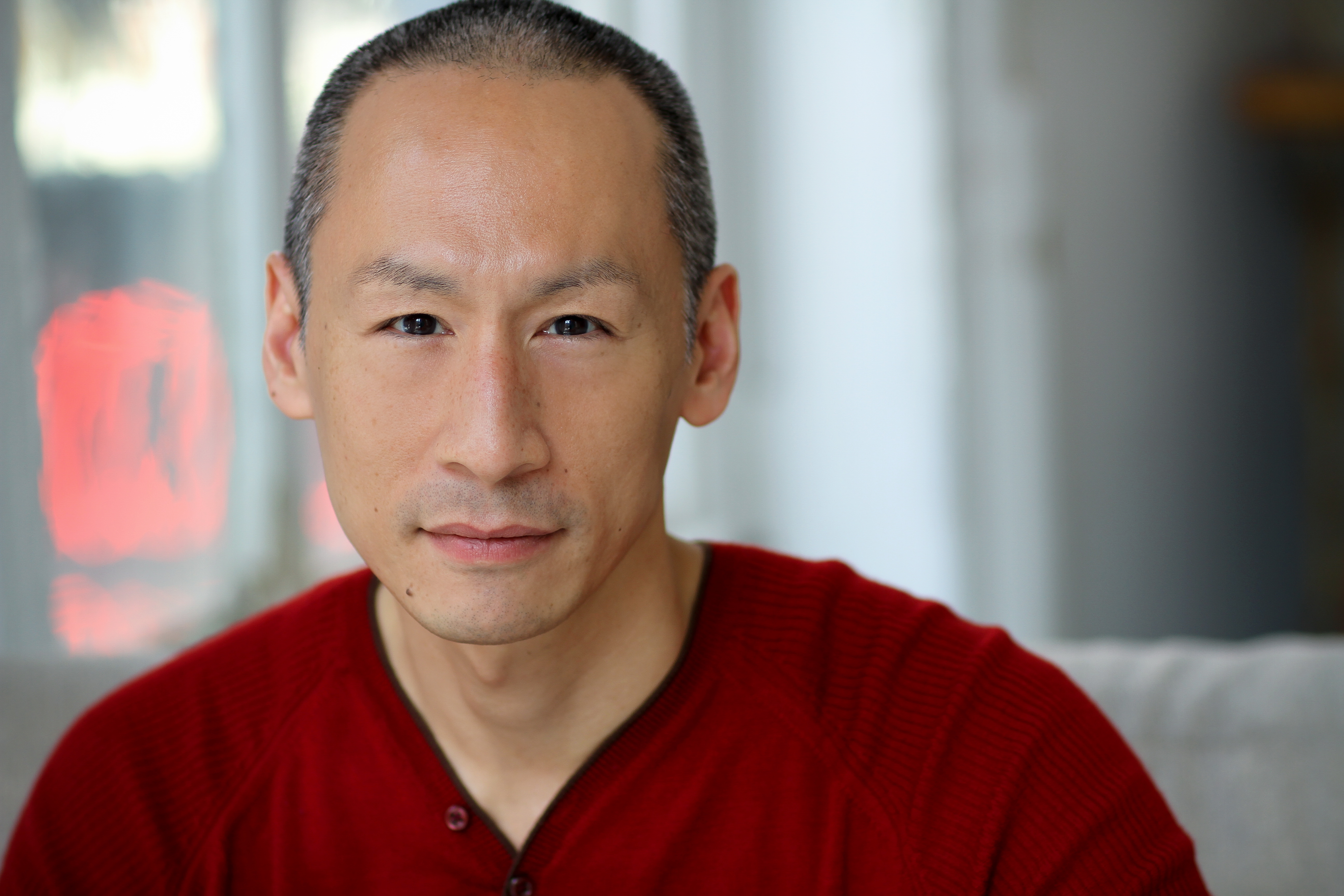
- Francis Jue, 2011
- Born: September 29, 1963 (age 63); San Francisco, California, U.S.
- Awards: 1 Tony Award; 2 Obie Awards; 2 Lortel Awards

Francis Jue (born September 29, 1963) is an American actor and singer. Jue is known for his performances on Broadway, in national tours, off-Broadway and in regional theatre, particularly in the San Francisco Bay Area and at The Muny in St. Louis. His roles in plays and musicals range from Shakespeare and David Henry Hwang to Rodgers and Hammerstein and Disney. He is also known for his recurring role on the TV series Madam Secretary (2014–2019).

Jue's Broadway credits include Pacific Overtures (1984 and 2004); M. Butterfly (1989); Thoroughly Modern Millie (2002), in which he created the role of Bun Foo; and Yellow Face (2024) as HYH, a role which he had created off-Broadway in 2008. He has also appeared in film and in other television roles.

Among his acting awards are the Tony Award for Best Featured Actor in a Play and the Outer Critics Circle Award for Outstanding Featured Performer in a Broadway Play for his performance in Yellow Face (2025); an Obie Award and a Lortel Award for his performance in Yellow Face at the Public Theater (2008); a Dramalogue Award in Kiss of the Spider Woman at TheateWorks (1997); an Elliot Norton Award in Miss Saigon at North Shore Music Theatre (2013); another Obie Award for Wild Goose Dreams at the Public (2018); and a second Lortel Award in Cambodian Rock Band at the Signature Theatre (2020). He has also been nominated for three Drama Desk Awards (one in 2008 and two in 2020).

== Early life ==
Jue was born in San Francisco, California, the sixth of nine children of Chinese Americans Frank (an engineer for the U.S. Navy) and Jennie Jue. He grew up in the Richmond District of San Francisco and attended high school at St. Ignatius College Preparatory, taking part in the school's drama program. He received his B.A. degree at Yale University.

== Career ==
=== New York theatre ===
Jue first appeared in New York in 1984 in a production of Pacific Overtures as the boy in the tree and the Dutch Admiral. He appeared in a TheatreWorks production of the same musical in California in 1988, and later, he appeared in the show on Broadway as Madam (2004–05). He also appeared on Broadway in the original Broadway production of M. Butterfly, where he understudied the title character, Song Liling, and Comrade Chin (1989–90), also acted as understudy for these characters in the first national tour (1990–91); he then starred as Song Liling in the second national tour (1991–92). In the original Broadway production of Thoroughly Modern Millie, he created the role of Bun Foo (2002–04).

Jue's off-Broadway credits include Dr. Mendel in the 2006 National Asian American Theater Festival's revival of William Finn's Falsettoland; numerous roles with the New York Shakespeare Festival in Hamlet, King Lear, The Tragedy of Richard II, Pericles, Prince of Tyre, Timon of Athens and The Winter's Tale; Dream True: My Life with Vernon Dixon (Vineyard Theatre); Oscar in Chay Yew's A Language of Their Own (2005; Public Theatre); the father in Kevin So's musical, Victor Woo: The Average Asian American; and Vice-Principal Huang in No Foreigners Beyond This Point, by Warren Leight (2005).

He won the 2008 Lucille Lortel Award for Outstanding Featured Actor and a 2008 Obie Award for his performance in David Henry Hwang's Yellow Face at the Public Theater. He was also nominated for a 2008 Drama Desk Award for Outstanding Featured Actor in a Play. Of this role, writer Lia Chang observed: "Jue distinguishes himself as Hwang's father, Henry Y. Hwang. ... Jue's moving and heartfelt portrayal ... has been earning [him] rave reviews." Jue has said, "For me, Hwang's work has been a seminal part of being Asian-American in this culture. It's about feeling alienated in your own country." In 2009, after recovering from a back injury sustained in a 15-foot fall during rehearsals for a production of A Midsummer Night's Dream, Jue appeared in Coraline with MCC Theater at the Lucille Lortel Theatre in the role of Father. He returned to the Public Theater in 2011 as Sir Nathaniel in Love's Labor's Lost.

In early 2014, Jue played Bruce Lee's father off-Broadway in Signature Theatre Company's premiere of Hwang's Kung Fu. He appeared in The World of Extreme Happiness, a play by Frances Ya-Chu Cowhig, that premiered at Goodman Theatre in Chicago in September and October 2014 and reopened at Manhattan Theatre Club in New York City in February and March 2015. In between these two runs, with York Theatre Company in December 2014, he appeared in My Favorite Year. From October to December 2018, Jue appeared in Wild Goose Dreams, a new play by Hansol Jung, at the Public Theater, receiving another Obie Award for his performance.

In 2019, Jue reprised his role in Soft Power at the Public Theater beginning in September 2019. In 2020, he played Duch in Lauren Yee's Cambodian Rock Band at Signature Theatre. Jue was nominated for 2020 Drama Desk Awards and Lucille Lortel Awards for both roles; he won the Lortel Award for Outstanding Featured Actor in a Play for the latter role. He was also nominated for the Outer Critics Circle Award for Outstanding Featured Actor in a Musical for his role in Soft Power, and the show's cast album was nominated for the Grammy Award for Best Musical Theater Album. In 2021 Jue starred in the documentary theatre piece Twilight: Los Angeles, 1992 produced by Signature Theatre Company at the Pershing Square Signature Center in New York. The production won the Lucille Lortel Award for Outstanding Revival, and the cast was nominated for the Lortel Award for Outstanding Ensemble. Jue created the role of Howard in Audible Theater's Good Enemy, by Yilong Liu, at the Minetta Lane Theatre in October and November 2022.

In early 2024, Jue played the Wizard in the Encores! staging of Once Upon a Mattress. Jue returned to Broadway in 2024 in Yellow Face reprising the roles of HYH and others, which he had created off-Broadway in 2008; the production was aired by PBS. In the role, he won the Tony Award for Best Featured Actor in a Play and the Outer Critics Circle Award for Outstanding Featured Performer in a Broadway Play. Jue played Cleante in Tartuffe off-Broadway at New York Theatre Workshop in late 2025. In mid-2026, he played Friar Laurence in Romeo and Juliet at Shakespeare in the Park. A reviewer wrote that "Jue charms as a particularly gossipy Friar Laurence whose long-standing affectionate mentorship of Romeo seems believable here." Jue became ordained as a minister before the run began and married dozens of couples onstage at the Delacorte, while in costume, at the end of the show. PBS is set to air a recording of the show on November 13, 2006, and stream it on their app. From October to November of the same year, he is scheduled to reprise his role as the father in King of the Yees off-Broadway at Signature Theatre.

=== Other theatre ===
Jue has also appeared widely in regional theatre as Jeffrey in A Song for a Nisei Fisherman at Asian American Theatre Company (1988); the title character in M. Butterfly at Hippodrome Theatre (1992), TheatreWorks in California (1992, 2007), Arizona Theatre Company (1993) and Vineyard Playhouse (1994); the MC in Cabaret at Cider Mill Playhouse (1993) and TheatreWorks (1996, Bay Area Critics Circle Award), Sacramento Music Theatre (1998); Puck in A Midsummer Night's Dream at Arizona Theatre Company (1995); Amanuensis and Geronte in The Illusion at Arizona Theatre Company (1997, winning a ZONI award); Molina in Kiss of the Spider Woman at TheateWorks (1997, Dramalogue Award); Thomas in A Question of Mercy at Magic Theatre (1998); Mike, Ronald and Skunk in As Bees in Honey Drown and the title character in Amadeus, both at TheatreWorks (1999); The Parsi Man in Just So at North Shore Music Theatre (2001); Skeets Miller in Floyd Collins at TheatreWorks (2001); Hua in Red at Wilma Theatre (2003) and TheatreWorks (2004; "Jue ... is utterly convincing. He is self-righteous, stern and yet completely sympathetic."); the narrator in Into the Woods, which he also choreographed, at TheatreWorks (2006, Bay Area Critics Circle Award; "Jue ... shows his amazing physical acting talent. ... He has a true theatrical voice when doing the splendid narration of the story."); the King in The King and I at American Music Theatre of San Jose (2006) and Carousel Dinner Theatre (2008); and Mr. Oji in Philip Kan Gotanda's After the War at American Conservatory Theater in San Francisco (2007).

The Muny's 11,000-seat amphitheatre, where Jue has starred several times

At The Muny in St. Louis, he starred in the title roles of The King and I (2006) and Peter Pan in 2007 and as The Engineer in Miss Saigon in 2008. In 2009, he reprised his role in Yellow Face at TheatreWorks. In 2010, Jue played Smokey in Damn Yankees at The Muny. That fall, he starred as Dr. Givings in The Actors Theatre production of In the Next Room (or The Vibrator Play) in Phoenix, Arizona (for which he won a ZONI award). In 2011, he was back at The Muny as Sebastian in The Little Mermaid. CBS St. Louis wrote: "The consummate acting, dancing and singing skills of Francis Jue as Sebastian are a joy to experience." In early 2012, he appeared in The Winter's Tale at Yale Repertory Theatre and returned to The Muny that summer in Thoroughly Modern Millie (this time as Ching Ho) and Kassim in Aladdin. Later in the year, Jue created two roles in You for Me for You, a new play by Mia Chung, debuted at the Woolly Mammoth Theatre Company.

Jue appeared as Salvatore "Sally" Camatoy in a stage adaptation of Paper Dolls, by Philip Himberg, at the Tricycle Theatre in London from 28 February 2013 to 13 April 2013. The Daily Telegraph wrote: "Jue gives a haunting performance as Sally". The Times commented, "At [the musical's] heart is the relationship (which repeatedly made me cry) between Chaim ... and the wonderful Francis Jue as Salvatore – 'Sally'." In June, he appeared at the New Haven International Arts Festival in the musical Stuck Elevator, with music by Byron Au Yong and a libretto by Aaron Jafferis, directed by Chay Yew about a delivery man trapped in a Bronx elevator for 81 hours. In November, Jue returned to North Shore and to the role of the Engineer in Miss Saigon. A review in The Boston Globe commented: "Jue delivers an indelible portrait of a Mephistophelean hustler who doesn’t so much walk as slither, a cannily corrupt survivor adept at switching allegiances. ... Jue excels in one of the show’s best numbers, 'The American Dream'". Jue won an Elliot Norton Award for his performance and was nominated for an IRNE Award.

In October 2015, Jue created several roles, including Melvin the father, in a new comic play, Tiger Style! by Mike Lew at Alliance Theatre in Atlanta, Georgia. "Jue steals the show as he rapidly modulates between characters, performing with charisma and humor". In early 2016, Jue played sushi master chef Koji in Tokyo Fish Story by Kimber Lee at TheatreWorks. Later in the year, he reprised his roles in Tiger Style! in Boston. The following year, he played Larry Yee in King of the Yees, by Lauren Yee, in Chicago and Los Angeles. A reviewer for Chicago Sun-Times wrote: "You will, without any question, fall madly in love with Larry Yee, or more precisely, with Francis Jue, the wiry, wide-eyed, shrewdly comic, comically un-hip and altogether remarkable actor who plays him with such effortless guile." Jue repeated the role in 2019 at the San Francisco Playhouse. A reviewer for The San Diego Union-Tribune commented that in Wild Goose Dreams at La Jolla Playhouse in September and October 2017, "Jue portrays the father with a winning, playfully comic touch". Jue starred as DHH in David Henry Hwang and Jeanine Tesori's new "play with a musical", Soft Power, which opened at the Ahmanson Theatre in Los Angeles in May 2018 and moved to San Francisco's Curran Theatre in June.

In mid-2019, Jue played Resten in The Language Archive at TheatreWorks Silicon Valley. In 2022, with Yale Repertory Theatre, he starred in Today is My Birthday by Susan Soon, and with San Francisco Opera, he played Monk in Dream of the Red Chamber. He then reprised his roles in Twilight: Los Angeles, 1992 with American Repertory Theater at the Loeb Drama Center in Cambridge, Massachusetts. In 2023, he reprised his role in Cambodian Rock Band first at Alley Theatre in Houston, Texas, then at Berkeley Repertory Theatre in California and later at Arena Stage in Washington, D.C. In 2024, he reprised the role of the father in Tiger Style! at TheatreWorks, winning the Bay Area Critics Circle Award for Featured Performance – Comedy. In 2026, he starred as Z in What Became of Us, by Shayan Lotfi, at George Street Playhouse in New Jersey.

=== Television, film and radio ===
Jue's television credits include Dorian on Talk to Me (2000, ABC), voice of James in Nikki (2000, Cartoon Network), Dr. Yamagatchi on One Life to Live, Dr. Fong and later Judge Ong on Law & Order: Special Victims Unit (2004–06; 2013, NBC), Dr. Tom Li on The Good Wife (2009–10, CBS), and Dr. Halberton on Law & Order (2010, NBC). From 2014 to 2019, he played the recurring role of Chinese Foreign Minister Ming Chen on the CBS TV series Madam Secretary. In 2016, he played Hu in the Elementary episode "Worth Several Cities" and Mickey Burgess in the Divorce episode "Gustav". In 2020, he played Zeke Meridith in the New Amsterdam episode "In the Graveyard", and from 2020 to 2021, he appeared as the recurring character Fred on season 1 of the Starz series Hightown.

On film, Jue appeared in the 1999 comedy short, Puppet, Love & Mertz, as Mertz; and he made his feature film debut as Ang Hsu in Joyful Noise, in 2012, starring Dolly Parton and Queen Latifah. He played Chris in the 2019 short suspense-thriller Rendezvous.

In 2021, Jue starred in San Francisco Mime Troupe's radio serial "Tales of the Resistance, Volume 2: Persistence", Episode 2. He appeared as Dr. Chester Lu in the 2022 film White Noise and Jason in the 2023 drama Our Son. The 2026 Central Park production of Romeo and Juliet, with Jue as Friar Laurence, was filmed and is set for release as part of the PBS Great Performances series.

== Personal life ==
Since 1988, Jue's partner has been Randy Adams, a theatrical producer whom he met during Jue's stint that year in Pacific Overtures at TheatreWorks, where Adams was then the managing director. They married in 2018 after 30 years as a couple.
