= Mr. T and Tina =

American sitcom

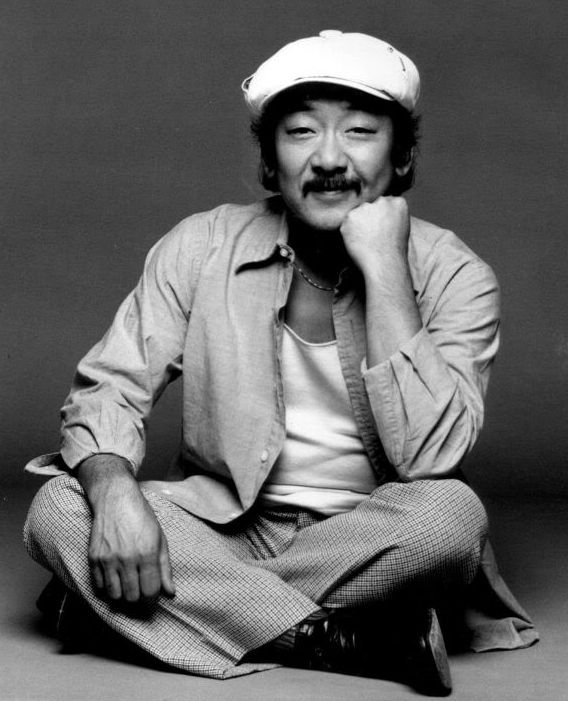
- Pat Morita in a promotional photo
- Genre: Sitcom
- Created by: James Komack
- Directed by: Rick Edelstein; James Komack; James Sheldon; Dennis Steinmetz
- Starring: Pat Morita; Susan Blanchard
- Opening theme: "Chicago", arranged by George Aliceson Tipton
- Composer: George Aliceson Tipton
- Country of origin: United States
- Original language: English
- No. of seasons: 1
- No. of episodes: 9 (4 unaired)

Production
- Executive producer: James Komack
- Producers: Bob Carroll, Jr. Madelyn Davis; Gary Shimokawa
- Camera setup: Multi-camera
- Running time: 22–24 minutes
- Production company: The Komack Company

Original release
- Network: ABC
- Release: September 25 – October 30, 1976

Related
- Welcome Back, Kotter

Mr. T and Tina is an American sitcom. It was a spin-off of Welcome Back, Kotter starring Pat Morita and Susan Blanchard that aired for five episodes on ABC from September 25 to October 30, 1976. It is one of the first television shows to feature a predominantly Asian-American cast. The series was a ratings flop and was cancelled after five aired episodes.

== Synopsis ==
Pat Morita starred as Taro Takahashi, a widowed Japanese inventor who is sent with his family (an uncle and sister-in-law) from Tokyo to set up the Chicago branch of his employer, Moyati Industries. He hires scatterbrained and free-spirited American Tina Kelly (Susan Blanchard) as the live-in governess for his children, Sachi (June Angela) and Aki (Gene Profanato).

Mr. T.'s inventions included underpants with a built-in transistor radio and the "flash in the can," a coin-operated sunlamp in a restroom.

== Cast ==
- Pat Morita as Taro Takahashi
- Susan Blanchard as Tina Kelly
- June Angela as Sachi
- Miriam Byrd-Nethery as Miss Llewellyn (The Landlady)
- Jerry Fujikawa as Uncle Matsu
- Ted Lange as Harvard the Handyman
- Gene Profanato as Aki
- Pat Suzuki as Michi (Taro's sister-in-law)

=== Guest stars ===
- Lew Horn
- Sydney Lassick
- Nobu McCarthy
- Bob Okazaki
- Kinji Shibuya as Kazu
- Muriel Weldon

=== Cameos ===
- John Travolta as Vinnie Barbarino ("Tina Really Truly Gets Fired")
- Ron Palillo as Arnold Horshack ("Tina Really Truly Gets Fired")
- Lawrence Hilton-Jacobs as Freddie "Boom Boom" Washington ("Tina Really Truly Gets Fired")
- Robert Hegyes as Juan Epstein ("Tina Really Truly Gets Fired")

== History ==
=== Development ===
According to series creator Komack, Chico and the Man was originally conceived with Nisei and Chicano leads; because that pairing proved awkward, he saved the Japanese-American character for another show. Mr. T and Tina was billed as "based on Japanese-American culture" and first noted to be in production in April 1976. Shortly afterward, it was rumored that NBC would be counterprogramming a new show with the working title Mrs. T. and Sympathy, about a widowed Caucasian businesswoman from America moving to Tokyo.

The first pilot episode was filmed with George Takei in the lead role, but when ABC decided to target a less sophisticated audience at an earlier timeslot, a new pilot was taped, this time with Pat Morita in the lead.

The comedy was based on the conflict between Mr. T's traditional Japanese culture and Tina's free-spirited ways; Morita stated "Our comedy is going to come largely from the human chaos that evolves from the cross-culture differences. I think that can be an immensely rich area which we can develop." An advertisement for the series premiere used the slogan "Comedy explodes when East meets West!" and called Mr. Takahashi "an immovable object" while Tina was "a dynamic irresistible force". According to Morita, the pilot was well-received following an early screening to Japanese Americans living in Los Angeles: "They fell down laughing. They could see themselves in the same situations. Then we had some friends from Japan look at it and they cracked up."

During the publicity run-up to the premiere, Morita said that he sought advice from Mel Blanc to develop Mr. T's accent. Morita, a veteran of the stand-up comedy circuit, had already been cast when Blanchard was invited to read for the role of Tina; she recounted the role had been written for "a voluptuous hip girl" who was a kind of "blue-eyed, curlylocks [blonde]" and thought she would not be hired. At their first meeting, Blanchard was told that Morita spoke no English, but was instructed to tell him a joke that he could understand; two weeks later, she "was amazed at the amount of English Pat had learned". One news article compared the upcoming series to The Courtship of Eddie's Father (1969–72), also created by Komack, with reversed ethnic roles.

Tom Bosley said that if Mr. T and Tina proved to be a hit, Morita's character on Happy Days, Matsuo "Arnold" Takahashi, would "probably [be killed] off by some crazy kamakazi [sic] pilot" but promised that Morita could return to Happy Days any time he wants. Morita was written off from Happy Days by having his character Arnold get married.

=== Production ===
The show was produced by Madelyn Davis and Bob Carroll Jr. Episodes were taped before a live audience using four cameras. The director was not present on set, but provided direction through a public address system.

Ted Lange and other actors who worked on the show criticized the writing after the show's cancellation.

=== Critical response and cancellation ===
Reportedly, the script for the pilot episode was revised eight times before it was taped. After the pilot was screened for national television critics in Los Angeles in June 1976, the group collectively voted it the "worst new show they had endured" and rued that Morita deserved a better vehicle for his talents. One critic recounted "It was so much worse than anything else we saw this summer that it looked as though it had possibly been made for some other purpose than entertainment, possibly for shipment to some enemy country where the CIA wanted to scramble the brains of the citizenry."

The critics that had attended the Los Angeles session were invited to re-watch the premiere episode in late September, being told "it is far different than the show you saw last June". Television critic John Archibald gave the revised premiere a tepid reception, noting that Tina's role had been cut back and Harvard was featured more prominently. Critic Lee Winfrey was more strongly negative: "I feel like suing ABC for damages. If I ever watch 'Mr. T and Tina' again it'll be when I'm bound and gagged."

"I would have said many people offered me condolences for being off the air," [Morita] said. "And that [when] people asked me why they took T. and Tina off, I had no answer. So I went to Mr. Komack.
"I said, 'Jimmy, why'd they take us off?' He says, 'Bad ratings.' I say, 'Why'd we get bad ratings?' He says, 'Well, we were on in a very bad time slot. People were still up.'"

— Pat Morita, quipping about the cancellation of Mr. T and Tina in an Associated Press article by Jay Sharbutt, published November 8, 1976

Programmed against Doc on CBS and the second half of Emergency! on NBC, Mr. T and Tina drew poor ratings and terrible reviews, and was cancelled after just five episodes were aired. The series was officially canceled on October 30, 1976 and What's Happening!! ran instead in the Saturday night timeslot at 8:30 starting on November 13.

According to Mark Evanier, a writer for Kotter, ABC had already decided to cancel Mr. T and Tina prior to the series premiere.

=== Legacy ===
The show has since been cited as one of the first television shows to star an Asian-American lead and feature a predominantly Asian-American cast, following the drama The Gallery of Madame Liu-Tsong (1951) and the animated The Amazing Chan and the Chan Clan (1972), and predating the sitcoms Gung Ho (1986) and Margaret Cho's All-American Girl (1994–95).

At the time it was aired, protests by the Asian-Americans for Fair Media and Japanese American Citizens League led to a promise by the producers to avoid stereotypical portrayals of Asian Americans.

== Episodes ==
The first episode of season 2 of Welcome Back, Kotter, entitled "Career Day", introduced Morita as Mr. Taro Takahashi (Mr. T), a speaker at the school's Career Day who offered Gabe Kotter a job with a better salary. The series premiere of Mr. T and Tina aired two days after "Career Day".

Davis and Carroll, the show's producers, also wrote the first episode aired, "Tina Really Truly Gets Fired". The episodes were shown out of production order, after network executives received negative feedback about the pilot episode, which was screened for television critics in June, prior to the series premiere. Although nine episodes were taped, only five were broadcast; the scripts for the nine episodes are held at the Television Script Archives of the Annenberg School for Communication at the University of Pennsylvania. The unaired ninth episode featured musician Rick Derringer as a guest star, playing a racist Vietnam War veteran who clashed with Mr. T. The last episode broadcast was entitled "I Thought He'd Never Leave".

No.	Title	Original release date
1	"Pilot (The Ogallala Connection)"	Unaired
2	"The Americanization of Michi"	October 16, 1976
Tina 'Americanizes' Michi, who had vowed to return to Japan.
3	"What Makes Sumo Run?"	October 2, 1976
Taro's sumo wrestler cousin (played by Kinji Shibuya) visits from Japan and develops a crush on Tina.
4	"Tina Really Truly Gets Fired"	September 25, 1976
Tina nearly kills Taro; after being dismissed, his family plans to win her back. Cameo appearance by the Sweathogs from Welcome Back, Kotter.
5	"I Thought He'd Never Leave"	October 30, 1976
According to tradition, Taro must host a houseguest who has worn out his welcome.
—	"Reading, Writing and Rice"	Unaired
Tina teaches the children Japanese culture.
—	"Guess Who's Coming to Live"	October 23, 1976
Taro and Tina meet for the first time. It is a disaster.
—	"I'm O.K., You're All Bananas"	Unaired
—	"Where Is My Wandering Matsu Tonight?"	Unaired

== Trivia ==
Because the character portrayed by Morita on Mr. T and Tina ("Taro Takahashi") shared a common surname with his character on Happy Days ("Arnold Takahashi"), some have mistaken the show as a spinoff of Happy Days. It was technically a spin-off of Welcome Back, Kotter, as Taro first appeared on that series in an episode aired soon before Mr. T debuted. Arnold Takahashi would later reappear in another series, Blansky's Beauties (1977), as an actual spinoff of Happy Days. After both Mr. T and Tina and Blansky's Beauties were canceled, Morita returned to Happy Days, portraying Arnold in occasional appearances, starting in 1982.

June Angela and Gene Profanato, the actors portraying the children, were actual siblings born to an Italian father and Japanese mother. After the show was cancelled, they were hired for the successful 1977 Broadway revival of The King & I starring Yul Brynner and Constance Towers. Angela played Tuptim and Profanato played the King's son, Prince Chulalongkorn.

June Angela again played the daughter ("Amy") of a character portrayed by Morita ("Kenji"), with Cloris Leachman as her mother ("Fran"), in the televised presentation of the play Blind Alleys, written by David Henry Hwang. The program first aired in 1985.
