= Nada Rowand =

American actress (born 1936)

- Born: November 30, 1936 (age 89); Sparta, Illinois, U.S.
- Education: University of Illinois
- Occupation: Actress
- Years active: 1960-present

Nada Rowand (born November 30, 1936) is an American actress. She is known for playing the role of Kate Rescott Slavinsky on the ABC daytime soap opera Loving (1984 to 1995). She has appeared on Broadway in The Unsinkable Molly Brown (1960), Walking Happy (1966), Richard III (1979), The Survivor (1981), and The Young Man from Atlanta (1997).

== Early life ==
Rowand was born in Sparta, Illinois, and raised in Melvin. She was an only child. She began singing before she could talk. As a young girl, she loved performing and entered contests sponsored by the 4-H club. Rowand formed a music group with some of her high school friends called The Cloverettes. They were booked on The Original Amateur Hour, hosted by Ted Mack.

After high school, Rowand enrolled at the University of Illinois as a music major. She moved to New York after graduation, intending to become an opera singer. When she didn't find success as a singer, she began working in musical theater.

== Career ==
In the early 1960s, Rowand performed on Broadway in Milk and Honey. The show's star, opera singer Robert Weede, became her mentor. She moved to San Francisco and studied with him, then went to Germany to establish an opera career. When her plans didn't work out, she decided to focus on acting. Rowand returned to New York and studied with Uta Hagen.

She had a singing role in the original Broadway production of The Unsinkable Molly Brown. In 1966, she played a townswoman in the original Broadway production of Walking Happy. Rowand's other stage credits include The Marriage of Figaro, Ladies in Waiting, Orlando, The Rainmaker, Hansel and Gretel, The Iceman Cometh, The Price, Mrs. Warren's Profession, Bells Are Ringing, Blithe Spirit, The Diary of Anne Frank, Dance of Death, The Man Who Came to Dinner, and Guys and Dolls.

In 1970 and 1972, she performed in USO tours in Vietnam. On television, she guest starred on Nancy and Bewitched. Rowand played Mother in Doubletalk (1975), a drama about Alzheimer's disease. The production was nominated for an Academy Award for Best Live Action Short Film. She also appeared in the film Super Seal (1975), co-starring with Sterling Holloway. In 1978, she co-starred with Sylvester Stallone in the film F.I.S.T. Rowand returned to Broadway in 1979, as a "stand by" for the roles of Elizabeth and The Duchess of York in a revival of Richard III, starring Al Pacino.

In 1980, for the Humana Festival at the Actors Theatre of Louisville in Louisville, Kentucky, she appeared in two productions: in Adele Edling Shank's play Sunrise/Sunset as Louise, and as Yvonne in Kent Broadhurst's play They're Coming to Make It Brighter.

Rowand played Sevek's Mother in the original Broadway production of The Survivor, opening at the Morosco Theatre on March 3, 1981. In May 1981, she appeared as Marianne in Gethsemane Springs at the Spectrum Theater. In December 1981, she played Helen in The Midnight Visitor at St. Peter's Hall.

In 1984, Rowand was cast as Kate Rescott on the ABC soap opera Loving. The character was a widow and the matriarch of a large family, including daughter Ava Rescott (Lisa Peluso). Kate owned a pie shop and converted her home into a boarding house. She eventually found love with Louie Slavinsky (Bernard Barrow).

She appeared in the television film Blind Alleys (1985). She guest starred on Highway to Heaven and Kate & Allie. Rowand appeared in the film Masquerade (1988), co-starring with Rob Lowe.

Rowand stayed on Loving until its final episode aired in November 1995. She guest starred on Law & Order. In 1997, she returned to Broadway in The Young Man from Atlanta, as an understudy for the roles of Lily Dale Kidder and Miss Lacey. In 2002, Rowand starred as Louise Nevelson in Embers at the Chelsea Playhouse. In July 2004, she appeared in the musical Mimi le Duck at the Adirondack Theatre Festival.

In 2015, Rowand appeared as Elizabeth, an elderly mother with memory loss who has to contend with her fighting caretaker children, in Kate Hawley's play Complications from a Fall, which ran at Center Stage Theater in Santa Cruz, California.

== Personal life ==
In the 1980s, Rowand opened three stores, called Sonrisa, which sold works by contemporary Mexican artists and craftsmen. The stores were located in Taos, New Mexico and Los Angeles, California. Rowand's business partners looked after the shops while she worked on Loving.

== Filmography ==
=== Film ===
Year	Title	Role	Notes
1975	Super Seal	Mother	Credited as Neda Rowand
1975	Doubletalk	Mother	Short film
1978	F.I.S.T.	Mrs. Vasko	
1988	Masquerade	Mrs. Chase	

=== Television ===
Year	Title	Role	Notes
1970	Nancy	Wilkie	Episode: "Budget, Budget, Who's Got the Budget?"
1971	Bewitched	Servant Girl	Episode: "The Return of Darrin the Bold"
1984–1995	Loving	Kate Rescott Slavinsky	Contract role
1985	Blind Alleys	Clara Brockway	Television film
1986	Highway to Heaven	Mrs. Burke	Episodes: "A Special Love: Part 1 & Part 2"
1989	Kate & Allie	Dr. Brown	Episode: "Trojan War"
1991–1992	All My Children	Kate Rescott Slavinsky	Guest appearances
1994; 1999	Law & Order	Presiding Justice No.2; Dr. Margaret Slavin	Episodes: "Precious", "Refuge: Part 2"
