= Peer Gynt (disambiguation) =

Peer Gynt is a play by Henrik Ibsen named for its main character, based on the fairy tale Peer Gynt.

Peer Gynt may also refer to:

- Peer Gynt (Grieg), incidental music to Ibsen's play by Edvard Grieg, commonly performed in two concert suites
- Peer Gynt (1998 adaptation), by David Henry Hwang and Stephan Muller
- Peer Gynt (opera), a 1938 opera by Werner Egk
- Peer Gynt, a ballet by John Neumeier set to music by Alfred Schnittke
- Peer Gynt Sculpture Park, in Oslo, Norway
- Peer Gynt (mountain road), a tourist mountain road in Norway
- Peer Gynt Prize, an annual award since 1971
- Peer Gynt (1915 film), an American fantasy silent film
- Peer Gynt (1918 film)
- Peer Gynt (1919 film), a German silent film
- Peer Gynt (1934 film), a German drama film
- Peer Gynt (1941 film)

== See also ==
- Per Gynt, the fairy tale upon which the play Peer Gynt is based
- Peer Günt, a Finnish hard rock band
