= June Angela =

American actress, singer, and dancer

- Occupations: Actress, singer, tap dancer
- Years active: 1971–present
- Website: www.juneangela.com

June Angela is an American actress, singer, and dancer. Her best-known role is that of Julie, the mainstay member of the Short Circus band that was featured in the PBS children's television series The Electric Company during its entire six-year run.

== Early years ==
Angela is of Italian and Japanese heritage. Her father met her mother in Osaka, Japan, after the Korean War. She learned to speak Japanese as a child, when visiting her mother's relatives, but eventually forgot the language. She started performing in stage productions at an early age. Her younger brother also worked as a child actor. Angela was encouraged to pursue modeling as a young child by an acquaintance of her mother, going on to portray the live version of Remco's "Jan Doll" in a commercial for the toy, part of its Pocketbook line.

== The Short Circus ==
As Julie, Angela grew up on The Electric Company. She was awarded an Emmy of Honor in 1976 for her work on the series. Angela sang on the Grammy Award-winning 1971 soundtrack album of The Electric Company as well. Angela said she named her Short Circus character Julie after her idol at the time, Julie Andrews.

== Career highlights ==
When The Electric Company began wrapping production, Angela became a regular on the first Asian American TV comedy series Mr. T and Tina (ABC) where she and her brother played Pat Morita's children. Numerous works in theater and television followed. Most notably she was nominated for Broadway's Tony and Drama Desk Award as Best Leading Actress in a Musical for Shogun: The Musical. In 2017, she starred opposite Danny Glover as his wife in the two-character play Yohen at East West Players in Los Angeles. She also appeared as Madame Xing, Jessica's psychic on the ABC TV series Fresh Off the Boat.

She co-starred as Tuptim with Yul Brynner in the Broadway & London Palladium Revival of The King and I (1977) and starred in many world premieres including Sayonara and Off-Broadway's Cambodia Agonistes at Pan Asian Repertory Theatre. For Velina Hasu Houston's Tea, she won a Theater Guild Award for Best Lead Actress. Additionally, on television, she starred alongside Cloris Leachman and Pat Morita, once again, in a TV drama, Blind Alleys written by David Henry Hwang and Frederic Kimball. She then went to Kyoto to film the TV movie American Geisha (CBS), which was based on the autobiographical book by Liza Dalby.

Other TV roles include recurring on Mad TV, starring in Nightingale, ER, Step By Step, Hannah Montana and Dexter. She was also featured on the Emmy Award-winning special Free to be You and Me, which starred numerous luminaries. Her voice work includes the Emmy Award-winning series The Big Blue Marble, Nickelodeon's The Wild Thornberrys, Danny Phantom, and Walt Disney Studios' English dub of Kiki's Delivery Service, for which she co-wrote the song "Soaring".

Angela holds the distinction of making the youngest solo soprano debut at age 10 as Flora in Benjamin Britten's The Turn of the Screw with the New York City Opera at Lincoln Center. Later, Angela's solo album, released on Original Cast Records, features a full orchestra on songs from shows she has done, which includes a medley from The Electric Company and several jazz numbers.

In 2006, Angela and other cast members of The Electric Company, including Morgan Freeman, Rita Moreno, and Joan Ganz Cooney, were interviewed for the 2006 DVD The Best of The Electric Company.

Angela was levitated atop the World Trade Center by Doug Henning in the "highest levitation in the world". In June 1976, the photo was featured on the cover of The Electric Company Magazine.

She has recorded over 40 audiobook titles using different character voices, primarily for children on Audible.

== Partial filmography ==
Year	Title	Role	Notes
1971–1977	The Electric Company	Julie	780 episodes
1997	The Real Adventures of Jonny Quest	Anaya, Airport Security Guard (voice)	2 episodes
2000	The Wild Thornberrys	Arioka (voice)	Episode: "Gobi Yourself"
2004–2007	Danny Phantom	Shelly Makamoto, Principal Ishiyama, Harriet Chin (voice)	9 episodes
2006	Hannah Montana	Cassie	Episode: "Torn Between Two Hannahs"
2006	ER	Mariko Shimane	Episode: "Ames v. Kovac"
2006	Dexter	Doctor	Episode: "Love American Style"
2015–2018	Fresh Off the Boat	Madame Xing	2 episodes
2026-present	Avatar: Seven Havens	Dr. Jia, Various voices (voice)	2 episodes
