= Year of the Dragon (1985 film) =

1985 film by Michael Cimino

- Theatrical poster
- Directed by: Michael Cimino
- Screenplay by: Oliver Stone; Michael Cimino
- Based on: Year of the Dragon (1981 novel) by Robert Daley
- Produced by: Dino De Laurentiis
- Starring: Mickey Rourke; John Lone; Ariane Koizumi
- Cinematography: Alex Thomson
- Edited by: Françoise Bonnot
- Music by: David Mansfield
- Production companies: Dino De Laurentiis Company; Metro-Goldwyn-Mayer
- Distributed by: MGM/UA Entertainment Company (U.S.); Thorn EMI Screen Entertainment (International)
- Release date: August 16, 1985 (U.S.)
- Running time: 134 minutes
- Country: United States
- Languages: English; Mandarin; Cantonese
- Budget: $21.5–24 million
- Box office: $18.7 million (US/Canada) $30.4 million (worldwide rentals)

Year of the Dragon is a 1985 American crime thriller film co-written and directed by Michael Cimino, and starring Mickey Rourke, John Lone, and Ariane Koizumi. The film follows tough New York City police captain Stanley White (Rourke) battling ruthless Chinese-American Triad boss Joey Tai (Lone). The screenplay, written by Cimino and Oliver Stone, is based on a 1981 novel by Robert Daley.

Cimino's first film after the box office failure of Heaven's Gate (1980), Year of the Dragon is a New York crime drama and an exploration of gangs, the illegal drug trade, ethnicity, racism, and stereotypes.

Released by MGM/UA Entertainment on August 16, 1985, the film received mixed reviews and did not perform well at the US box office, though it did receive two Golden Globe Award nominations: Best Supporting Actor – Motion Picture for John Lone and Best Original Score for David Mansfield. It has since gained a cult following.

== Plot ==
Stanley White is New York City's most decorated police captain and a Vietnam War veteran assigned to New York City's Chinatown. His personal mission to crack down on Chinese organized crime causes him to neglect his wife, Connie.

White comes into conflict with Joey Tai, a young man who ruthlessly rises to become the head of the Triads. As a result of his ambition, he creates a high profile for himself and the Triads' activities. Together, they end the uneasy truce that has existed between the Triads and the police precinct, even as they conduct a personal war between themselves and the Italian Mob and Thai gangsters who have traditionally been involved in their heroin supply chain.

The married captain also becomes romantically involved with Tracy Tzu, a television reporter, who comes under brutal attack from the criminals, as does White's long-suffering wife Connie. This makes him even more determined to destroy the triads, and especially Joey Tai.

White also hires an up-and-coming Chinese rookie cop, Herbert, to go undercover as one of Tai's restaurant workers. Herbert manages to obtain inside information on a drug shipment, but he is betrayed by corrupt cop Alan Perez and is killed when Tai is informed by Perez that Herbert is a cop. Now that Tai's gang has raped Tzu, killed White's wife, and Herbert, White wastes no time in confronting Tai just as the shipment arrives.

At the harbor, Tai and his bodyguard are on their way to the shipment when White attempts to arrest them. Perez drives by, yelling abuse. White shoots and kills Perez, but Tai draws a gun and shoots White in the hand, also accidentally killing his bodyguard. Tai flees on a train bridge. This leads to a showdown where White and Tai run at each other while firing recklessly. White shoots Tai, leaving him wounded in both legs. Rather than suffer, and losing face, Tai asks for White's gun in order to commit suicide. He kills himself in front of White.

The final scene shows White and Tzu coming together in the streets of Chinatown at Tai's funeral.

== Cast ==
- Mickey Rourke as Captain Stanley White
- John Lone as Joey Tai
- Ariane Koizumi (credited as 'Ariane') as Tracy Tzu
- Leonard Termo as Angelo Rizzo
- Raymond J. Barry as Lou Bukowski
- Victor Wong as Harry Yung
- Dennis Dun as Herbert Kwong
- Caroline Kava as Connie White
- Eddie Jones as William McKenna
- Joey Chin as Ronnie Chang
- K. Dock Yip as Milton Bin
- Pau Hon-Lam as Fred Hung
- Daniel Davin as Francis Kearney
- Mark Hammer as Commissioner Sullivan
- Jack Kehler as Alan Perez
- Jilly Rizzo as Schiro
- Tony Lip as Lenny Carranza
- Fan Mei-sheng as "White Powder" Ma
- Yukio Yamamoto as Ban Sung
- Chen Chao-jung as "Jade Cobra"
- Roza Ng Leung as Laura Wong Tai

== Production ==
=== Development and pre-production ===
Michael Cimino was approached many times to direct an adaptation of Robert Daley's novel, but consistently turned the opportunity down. When he finally agreed, Cimino realized he was unable to write and direct in the time allotted; The producers already had an approximate start date for the film. He brought in Oliver Stone, who he had met through his producer and friend Joann Carelli, to help him write the script.

Cimino was prompted to seek out Stone after reading, and being impressed by, Stone's (at the time) unproduced Platoon screenplay. Cimino asked Stone to work on Year of the Dragon for a lower-than-normal wage as part of a quid pro quo deal, namely, that Year of the Dragon producer Dino De Laurentiis would help in finding the funding for Stone to make Platoon. Stone agreed to this deal.

"With Michael, it's a 24-hour day", said Stone. "He doesn't really sleep ... he's truly an obsessive personality. He's the most Napoleonic director I ever worked with". Cimino did a year and a half of research on the project.

While De Laurentiis gave director Cimino final cut in his contract, De Laurentiis also sent Cimino a side letter that said, notwithstanding the contract, he would not have final cut. This information was revealed when the producers of The Sicilian sued Cimino over the length of that film.

=== Casting ===
Because the production was moving so fast, casting began before the script was completed. Originally, Stone and Cimino had either Nick Nolte or Jeff Bridges in mind for the role of Stanley White, but after seeing Mickey Rourke in The Pope of Greenwich Village and working with him on Heaven's Gate, Cimino changed his mind. According to Rourke, the difficulty with playing White was making himself appear 15 years older to suit the character. Cimino drew heavily on the real-life boxing prowess of Rourke. At first, Rourke did not take his physical training seriously, so Cimino hired Hells Angels member Chuck Zito to be Rourke's instructor. Rourke was often quoted in many interviews stating that he loved working with Cimino despite the disapproved reputation he earned himself over the years since his previous box office failures, quoting, "He was a ball of fire. I hadn't seen anyone quite like him". Rourke was paid $1 million to star in the film.

To play the Chinese characters, casting director Joanna Merlin scouted in New York, Los Angeles, San Francisco, Toronto and other cities with large Overseas Chinese populations and performing arts scenes. John Lone, who had won a 1981 Obie Award for his role in David Henry Hwang's FOB, was a relative unknown when he was cast to play Joey Tai. Cimino chose him after seeing his performance in the film Iceman. K. Dock Yip, a prominent Chinese Canadian lawyer and leader of Toronto's Chinese community, was a local hire. As several scenes were shot in Southeast Asia, several Hong Kong and Taiwanese actors were cast in supporting roles. These included Shaw Brothers veteran Fan Mei-sheng, and Tsai Ming-liang regular Chen Chao-jung.

Year of the Dragon was the film debut of top model-turned-actress Ariane Koizumi (credited under the mononym 'Ariane'), whose performance was widely-criticized.

=== Filming ===
As with Streets of Fire, most of the film was shot not on location but on soundstages, after meticulous research of various locales which could be passed off as Chinatown and/or East Asia. As shooting on-location in Manhattan Chinatown, the film's primary location, would have been prohibitively expensive, a full-scale recreation of the location was constructed on the De Laurentiis Studios (now EUE/Screen Gems Studios) backlot in Wilmington, North Carolina. A week before filming was set to begin, a hurricane destroyed most of the set, which had to be hastily rebuilt. The sets proved realistic enough to fool even Stanley Kubrick, who attended the movie's premiere. Cimino actually had to convince The Bronx–born Kubrick that the film's exteriors were shot on the DEG backlot, and not on location.

Other cities used in filming included New York City, Toronto, Vancouver, Victoria, British Columbia, Bangkok and Chiang Rai. Cimino said he often liked to shoot in different cities, with interiors in one city and exteriors in another. In one scene, Joey Tai and his lawyer Bear Siku (Gerald Orange) walk through a Chinese textile mill, past a guard-rail and into a shoddy apartment building to meet up with two of his assassins. The textile mill was in Bangkok, the guard-rail was in New York and the apartment building was in Wilmington. When one of the script supervisors commented that the scene "wouldn't cut" (edit seamlessly together), Cimino bet her $1,000 that it would. Upon seeing the cut, the script supervisor conceded and Cimino won the bet but refused to take the $1,000.

The catacombs of Victoria's Empress Hotel doubled for a mung bean factory, while the British Columbia Parliament Buildings doubled for New York City police headquarters.

Unlike Heaven's Gate, Cimino was able to bring the film in on time and on budget.

=== Post-production ===
At the end of the film, White's final line is "You were right and I was wrong. I'd like to be a nice guy. But I just don't know how to be nice". According to Cimino, the final line of White was supposed to be "Well, I guess if you fight a war long enough, you end up marrying the enemy". The studio vetoed the original line, written by Stone. Cimino feels that either the studio or the producers thought the original line was politically incorrect.

== Release ==
The film opened at number 5 on the US box office charts, grossing $4,039,079 in 982 theaters on its opening weekend of August 16, 1985. It opened to decent business in major American cities including Washington, D.C., Detroit, and Pittsburgh, but the draw soon dropped, which was perceived to be the result of protest against it from Asian American groups (see below). Year of the Dragon grossed $18.7 million in the United States and Canada. Worldwide, it earned theatrical rentals of $30.4 million against a cost of between $21 and $24 million.

== Reception ==
=== Critical response ===
Year of the Dragon received polarized reviews upon its release in 1985. Vincent Canby wrote for The New York Times: "Year of the Dragon is light years away from being a classic, but then it makes no pretense at being anything more than what it is — an elaborately produced gangster film that isn't boring for a minute, composed of excesses in behavior, language and visual effects that, eventually, exert their own hypnotic effect." Janet Maslin, in contrast, also writing for The New York Times, deplored a lack of "feeling, reason and narrative continuity", under which the actors fared "particularly badly", especially Ariane Koizumi whose role in the movie was "ineffectual".

Rex Reed of the New York Post gave Dragon one of his most ecstatic reviews: "Exciting, explosive, daring and adventurous stuff." In a televised review, Roger Ebert of the Chicago Sun-Times said, "There is so much in this movie that sometimes you get confused; the movie is structurally a mess. Scenes fit in in places where you can't really figure out why they came in there instead of earlier. But, despite all of that confusion, Year of the Dragon is so entertaining, and occasionally so funny, and indeed so violent, that it does work as a movie." Ebert awarded the movie three stars out four. Leonard Maltin gave the film two and a half stars, calling it a "Highly charged, arresting melodrama ... but nearly drowns in a sea of excess and self-importance." Pauline Kael of The New Yorker dismissed the film as "hysterical, rabble rousing pulp, the kind that goes over well with subliterate audiences."

The performance of first-time actress Ariane Koizumi was widely criticized. The Los Angeles Times summarized the character of Tracy Tzu as "there to fulfill all Oriental-woman fantasies", and The New York Times called Koizumi "so ineffectual a part of the film's framework that she is even upstaged, in a nude scene, by a glimpse of the Brooklyn Bridge". She would only make a handful of minor acting appearances, before returning to her first career in fashion.

The film has a 55% "rotten" rating on Rotten Tomatoes from 20 reviews, with a weighted average of 6.3/10. Metacritic, which uses a weighted average, assigned the film a score of 58 out of 100, based on 14 critics, indicating "mixed or average" reviews.

=== Top Ten lists ===
3rd (in 1985) – Cahiers du Cinéma

=== Awards and nominations ===
The film was nominated for a Best Foreign Film (Meilleur film étranger) César Award for Best Foreign Film at the 11th César Awards. John Lone received a Best Supporting Actor Golden Globe nomination and David Mansfield received a Best Original Score nod at the 43rd Golden Globe Awards.

Conversely, the film was nominated for five Razzie Awards, including Worst Screenplay, Worst Picture, Worst Director, Worst Actress and Worst New Star (both for Ariane) at the 6th Golden Raspberry Awards.

== Controversy ==
Members of the Chinese American and Asian American communities protested against the film, criticizing the film for its racial stereotyping, widespread xenophobia, and use of slurs (especially the use of the derogatory terms "chinks", "slant-eyed", and "yellow niggers"), and sexism. Some groups worried that the film would make Chinatown unsafe and cause an economic downturn in the community. As a result of the controversy, a disclaimer was attached to its opening credits, which read:

This film does not intend to demean or to ignore the many positive features of Asian Americans and specifically Chinese American communities. Any similarity between the depiction in this film and any association, organization, individual or Chinatown that exists in real life is accidental. (Note: The disclaimer appears on the US VHS release and cable television but not the 2005 Region 1 DVD release.)

In her negative review, Pauline Kael added, "Year of the Dragon isn't much more xenophobic than The Deer Hunter was, but it's a lot flabbier; the scenes have no tautness, no definition, and so you're more likely to be conscious of the bigotry."

Director Cimino responded to the controversy in an interview in Jeune cinéma:

The film was accused of racism, but they didn't pay attention to what people say in the film. It's a film which deals with racism, but it's not a racist film. To deal with this sort of subject, you must inevitably reveal its tendencies. It's the first time that we deal with the marginalization which the Chinese were subject to. On that subject, people know far too little. Americans discover with surprise that the Chinese were excluded from American citizenship up until 1943. They couldn't bring their wives to America. Kwong's speech to Stanley is applauded. For all these reasons, the Chinese love the film. And the journalists' negative reactions are perhaps a shield to conceal these unpleasant facts.

== Legacy ==
Quentin Tarantino has praised this film as one of his favorites, naming its climactic train tracks shoot-out as one of his favorite "Killer Movie Moments" in 2004, remarking, "You forget to breathe during it!".

Melanie Chisholm from the Spice Girls is shown in the music video for their 1997 single "Too Much" singing in a Chinatown, dressed in a red cheongsam; this scene is based upon the film.

There is a Carpenter Brut song titled "Looking For Tracy Tzu" from EP II (2015), in an apparent reference to the character of the same name.

The film also featured the first appearance of the Desert Eagle pistol, used by Rourke's character Stanley White, in a motion picture.
