= Four Greats (China) =

Political slogan during the Cultural Revolution

The Four Greats (Chinese: 四个伟大; pinyin: Sì gè wěidà) was a term in China used during the Cultural Revolution. They described Mao Zedong, Chairman of the Chinese Communist Party, as "a great teacher, a great leader, a great commander, and a great helmsman". This term was regarded as part of Mao Zedong's cult of personality during the Cultural Revolution.

== History ==
=== Background ===
In the autumn of 1964, Nikita Khrushchev, the First Secretary of the Communist Party of the Soviet Union, was forced to step down by Leonid Brezhnev and others. American journalist Edgar Snow once asked Mao Zedong: "The Soviets say that China is engaging in a personality cult. Is that true?" Mao replied: "Khrushchev was probably forced to step down because he did not have a personality cult. China does have a personality cult, and it needs a bit of one." In May 1966, with the assistance of the Cultural Revolution Group, Mao launched the Cultural Revolution in mainland China.

=== Proposal ===
During the Red August in 1966, different people proposed the titles of "mentor" and "helmsman" to Mao on different occasions. On 18 August, Mao met with the Red Guards for the first time at Tiananmen Square in Beijing. The meeting was presided over by Chen Boda, the head of the Cultural Revolution Group. In his opening speech, he said: "Our great leader, great mentor, and great helmsman Chairman Mao is here to meet with you today." Then, Lin Biao said in his speech: "The supreme commander of this proletarian cultural revolution is our Chairman Mao. Chairman Mao is the commander-in-chief. Under the command of the great commander-in-chief....."

On 20 August, the People's Daily published an editorial entitled "Chairman Mao with the Masses," in which the Four Greats appeared for the first time: "On 18 August 1966, our great teacher, great leader, great commander, and great helmsman Chairman Mao, wearing the uniform of the People's Liberation Army, together with his close comrade-in-arms Comrade Lin Biao and other comrades, reviewed the million-strong army of the Great Proletarian Cultural Revolution on Tiananmen Square." On 31 August, when Mao met with the Red Guards for the second time, Lin Biao said in his speech: "On behalf of our great teacher, great leader, great commander, and great helmsman Chairman Mao, I would like to extend my greetings to the students from all over the country and to everyone!" After that, the Four Greats became widely known.

=== Discontinuation ===
From December 1966 onwards, Mao himself began to express his dissatisfaction with the title Four Greats during the review of documents and when meeting with foreign guests. At the end of December 1967, when reviewing the New Year's Day editorial drafted by the People's Daily, Mao asked to remove Four Greats. However, Wang Dongxing asked Mao: "Delete all four greats, and leave none?" Mao replied: "Then leave one." "I was a teacher, so let's leave the mentor. In fact, mentor is a teacher, but a little better than teacher." Thus, the New Year's Day editorial of 1968 stated: "At the beginning of the new year, hundreds of millions of soldiers and civilians across the country, with incomparably deep class feelings, sincerely wish our great mentor Chairman Mao a long life!"

On 18 December 1970, when Mao met with his old friend, American journalist Edgar Snow, he thought that "the worship has gone too far and there is a lot of formalism." As for the Four Greats, Mao thought it was "annoying" and "one day we will get rid of them all. Only 'teacher' will be left. Because I have always been a teacher and I am still a teacher now. All others will be dismissed." But at the same time, Mao also said: "It was necessary to do some personality cult in the past few years." This conversation revealed to the outside world for the first time Mao's aversion and dissatisfaction with some of the practices of Lin Biao and others. However, some analysts believe that Mao deliberately opposed the Four Greats in order to bring down Lin Biao. After that, the slogan of Four Greats was gradually stopped being mentioned, and it was completely discontinued after the Lin Biao incident in 1971.

== Description ==
The Four Greats referred to calling Mao Zedong:

- Great teacher (伟大的导师)
- Great leader (伟大的领袖)
- Great commander (伟大的统帅)
- Great Helmsman (伟大的舵手)
