= John Lone =

American actor

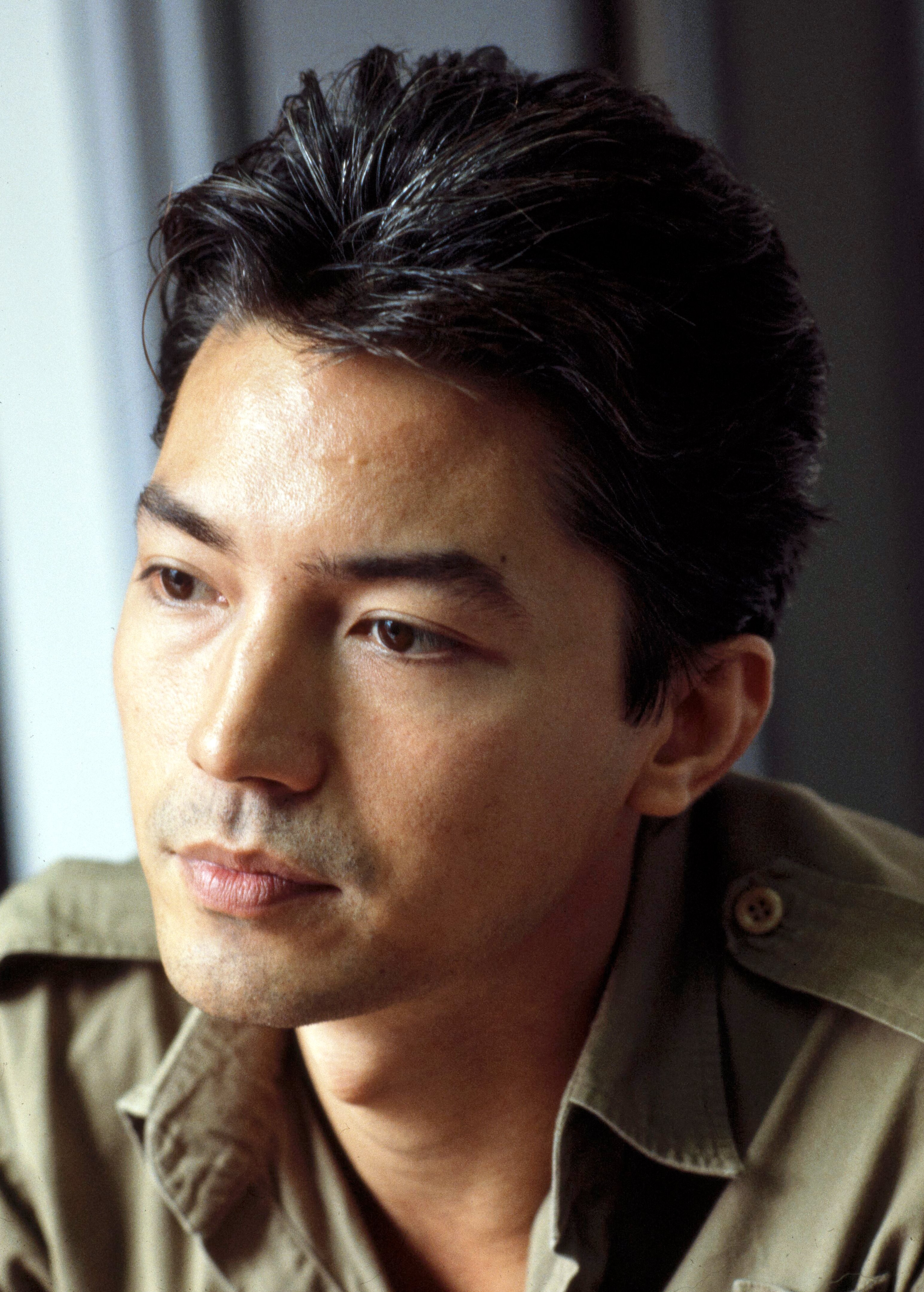
- Lone in 1984
- Born: Ng Kwok-leung (吳國良); October 13, 1952 (age 73); British Hong Kong
- Occupation: Actor
- Years active: 1976–2007
- Spouse: Nina Savino (m. 1972; div. 1979)

Chinese name
- Traditional Chinese: 尊龍
- Simplified Chinese: 尊龙
Transcriptions
Standard Mandarin
- Hanyu Pinyin: Zūn Lóng
Yue: Cantonese
- Jyutping: zyun1 lung4

Birth name
- Traditional Chinese: 吳國良
- Simplified Chinese: 吴国良
- Literal meaning: Ng Kwok-leung
Transcriptions
Standard Mandarin
- Hanyu Pinyin: Wú Guóliáng
Yue: Cantonese
- Jyutping: ng4 gwok3 loeng4

John Lone (Chinese: 尊龍; Jyutping: zyun1 lung4; pinyin: Zūn Lóng; born October 13, 1952) is a Chinese-American retired actor. He starred as Puyi in the Academy Award-winning film The Last Emperor (1987), for which he was nominated for a Golden Globe Award for Best Actor.

A veteran of the East West Players, he appeared in numerous high-profile screen and stage roles throughout the 1980s, 1990s and early 2000s, in films like Iceman, Year of the Dragon, M. Butterfly, The Shadow, and Rush Hour 2. He was nominated for the Independent Spirit Award for Best Supporting Male for his performance in The Moderns.

== Biography ==
Lone was born Ng Kwok-leung (Chinese: 吳國良; pinyin: Wú Guóliáng) in 1952 in British-ruled Hong Kong.

He was raised in an orphanage and later adopted by a woman from Shanghai. At age 7, he was sent to train in the style of the Peking opera at Hong Kong's Chin Chiu Academy, where he was trained in singing, dance, and classical Chinese theater techniques. It was here that he was given the name Johnny; he chose the surname Lone to reflect the fact that he was an orphan and for its similarity to Leung, part of his given name.

Lone declined an offer to join a Belgian dance company and a contract to make Kung fu films, and he accepted a sponsorship by an American family. He moved to Los Angeles and spent three years taking night classes at Santa Ana College to improve his English. In 1972, he married fellow student Nina Savino and gained American citizenship. They divorced in 1979. In 1978, he graduated from the American Academy of Dramatic Arts in Pasadena, California.

== Career ==
Due to the lack of roles in Hollywood for people of East Asian descent at the time, Lone was often left to play minor parts on television. Lone was with the East West Players, an Asian-American theatre organization, for 10 years before Mako offered him a role as an Asian emigrant trying to assimilate in David Henry Hwang's first play FOB. Lone starred alongside Tzi Ma and his performance garnered him an Obie Award in 1981.

One of his early film roles was as the cook in King Kong. His first major role in films was as the title character in Iceman. In 1985, John Lone played the gang leader Joey Tai in Michael Cimino's Year of the Dragon, for which he was nominated the Golden Globe Award for Best Supporting Actor.

Impressed by Lone's performance, Cimino recommended Lone to his longtime friend Bernardo Bertolucci, who was casting for The Last Emperor. Bertolucci met Lone while casting in Los Angeles and chose him as Puyi at first sight. Lone portrayed Puyi at different stages of his life, from an 18-year-old to a man in his sixties. In preparation for his role, he visited China to study the body language of the elderly. He was nominated for a Golden Globe Award for Best Actor in a Motion Picture - Drama at the 45th Golden Globe Awards in 1988 for his performance. He and Joan Chen presented the Academy Award for Best Documentary Short Film at the 1988 Academy Awards.

In 1987, David Henry Hwang and John Dexter were casting for Hwang's play M. Butterfly. Hwang knew of Lone's Peking opera training and thought of him for the part of Song Liling, an opera singer. He sent him a copy of the script, but Lone was too busy to respond. In 1991, David Cronenberg prepared to direct the film adaptation of M. Butterfly, and invited Lone to play Song Liling. After a three-hour meeting with Cronenberg, Lone agreed to play Song. Lone did his own singing for the film.

In the 1995 film The Hunted, Lone played assassin Kinjo alongside Christopher Lambert. Other international film appearances included the role of corrupt Hong Kong cop Ricky Tan in Rush Hour 2 (2001) and the antagonist Shiwan Khan in The Shadow (1994).

Lone's focus then shifted to the Chinese market. He played the Qianlong Emperor in the 30-episode television drama series Qianlong and the Fragrant Concubine (乾隆与香妃) in 2004. He also appeared in the title role of Kangxi Emperor, in Records of Kangxi's Travel Incognito (1998–2007), a Chinese television series about the Manchu-ruling Qing Empire monarch.

His most recent film role was 2007's War, co-starring Jet Li and Jason Statham.

== Filmography ==
=== Film ===
Year	Title	Role	Notes/Ref.
1976	King Kong	Chinese Cook	
1979	Americathon	Chinese Man	
1984	Iceman	Charlie	
1985	Year of the Dragon	Joey Tai	Nominated—Golden Globe Award for Best Supporting Actor
1987	Echoes of Paradise	Raka	
1987	The Last Emperor	Emperor Puyi (adult)	Nominated—Golden Globe Award for Best Actor
1988	The Moderns	Bertram Stone	Nominated—Independent Spirit Award for Best Male Performance
1989	Shadow of China	Henry Wong	
1991	Shanghai 1920	Billy Fong	
1993	M. Butterfly	Song Liling	
1994	The Shadow	Shiwan Khan	
1995	The Hunted	Kinjo	
1997	Task Force	Thug	Cameo appearance
2001	Rush Hour 2	Ricky Tan	
2004	Master of Everything aka Bamboo Shoot	Mi Jihong	
2007	War	Li Chang	

=== Television ===
Year	Title	Role	Notes/Ref.
1976	The Blue Knight	Terry Chow	TV series
1978	Kate Bliss and the Ticker Tape Kid	Houseman	TV movie
1978	Sword of Justice	The Destructors	TV series
1979	Eight Is Enough	Member of the Chinese Trade Mission	
1979	A Man Called Sloane	Lion Dance	TV series
1981	Hill Street Blues	Neighbor	
1982	Joseph Papp Presents: The Dance and the Railroad	Lone	TV movie
1986	Treffpunkt Kino	Self	TV documentary
2004	Qianlong and the Fragrant Imperial Concubine	Qianlong Emperor	
2005	Paper Moon Affair	Keiko's Husband	TV movie
2006	Records of Kangxi's Travel Incognito	Kangxi Emperor	

== Awards and nominations ==
Year	Award	Category	Film	Role	Result
1981	Obie Award	Obie Award for Performance	FOB	Steve	Won
1986	Golden Globe Awards	Best Supporting Actor – Motion Picture	Year of the Dragon	Joey Tai	Nominated
1988	Golden Globe Awards	Best Actor – Motion Picture Drama	The Last Emperor	Puyi	Nominated
1989	Independent Spirit Awards	Best Supporting Male	The Moderns	Bertram Stone	Nominated
