= As the Crow Flies (play) =

1986 play by David Henry Hwang

As the Crow Flies is a 1986 play by American playwright David Henry Hwang. The play depicts an African-American maid living in a Chinese home in Los Angeles and her double life. The play premiered at the Los Angeles Theatre Center on February 16, 1986, on a double bill with Hwang's The Sound of a Voice. It was directed by Reza Abdoh and featured Nobu McCarthy in the cast.

It is published as part of Between Worlds: Contemporary Asian-American Plays by Theatre Communications Group.
