= Bang Kok =

Play written by David Henry Hwang

- Original language: English
- Written by: David Henry Hwang in 1996

Premiere
- Date: 1996
- Place: San Francisco Magic Theatre

Bang Kok is a 1996 play by American playwright David Henry Hwang. The ten-minute piece was commissioned as part of Sean San Jose's Pieces of the Quilt, an evening of plays related to AIDS and people suffering with the disease.

== Overview ==
Bang Kok concerns two businessmen who share stories of prostitution rings in Thailand climaxing in one of the men confessing to his friend he has contracted AIDS. At one point the story is interrupted by the story of the Thai prostitute who passed on the disease.

== History ==
Pieces of the Quilt opened in 1996 at the San Francisco Magic Theatre, but Bang Kok was not included due to its specific casting needs. Currently, Bang Kok is not published.
