= The Dance and the Railroad =

1981 Off-Broadway play

- Original language: English
- Written by: David Henry Hwang

Premiere
- Date: 1981
- Place: Joseph Papp Public Theater

The Dance and the Railroad is a 1981 play by American playwright David Henry Hwang.

== Summary ==
Hwang's second play depicts a strike in a coolie railroad labor camp in the mid-19th-century American West.

== Production ==
The play premiered on March 25, 1981 as part of a commission by the New Federal Theatre. It had its professional debut on July 16, 1981 Off-Broadway at the Joseph Papp Public Theater. It was directed by John Lone, with Lone and Tzi Ma in the cast.

Actor Tzi Ma cited that Hwang would often rewrite the play during rehearsals.

== Adaptation ==
The play was adapted and produced for television by the Alpha Repertory Television Service channel under the direction of Emile Ardolino. This production won a CINE Golden Eagle Award.

An Off-Broadway revival was produced in 2013 at the Signature Theatre under the direction of May Adrales.

It is published as part of Trying to Find Chinatown: The Selected Plays by Theatre Communications Group and also in an acting edition published by Dramatists Play Service.
