= Jade Flowerpots and Bound Feet =

2001 play by David Henry Hwang

- Written by: David Henry Hwang
- Original language: English

Premiere
- Date premiered: 2001
- Place premiered: Joseph Papp Public Theater

Jade Flowerpots and Bound Feet is a 2001 play by American playwright David Henry Hwang. It deals with a Caucasian woman passing herself off as a minority for a book sell to a major publishing company. The play premiered as part of the production The Square, a night of short plays dealing with Asian American identity conceived by Lisa Peterson and Chay Yew. It started its run on November 5, 2001, at the Joseph Papp Public Theater. It was directed by Peterson.

It is published as part of 2004: The Best Ten-Minute Plays for Two Actors by Smith and Kraus.
