= Great Helmsman =

Great Helmsman (Chinese: 伟大的舵手; pinyin: Wěidà de duòshǒu) is a Chinese honorific title. Equivalent terms include Helm Master (Chinese: 舵师; pinyin: Duòshī) and Helmsman (Chinese: 舵手; pinyin: Duòshǒu). It most commonly refers to Mao Zedong (1893–1976), Chairman of the Chinese Communist Party and paramount leader of China from 1949 to 1976. It may also refer to:

- Xi Jinping (born 1953), General Secretary of the Chinese Communist Party (paramount leader) since 2012
- Jim Bolger (1935–2025), Prime Minister of New Zealand from 1990 to 1997
- The Great Helmsman (play), a 2007 play by David Henry Hwang
- Nicolae Ceaușescu (1918-1989), leader of Communist Romania. Nicolae Ceaușescu officially adopted this title ("Marele Cârmaci") after visiting China and North Korea in June 1971. He was so impressed by the massive cults of personality surrounding Mao Zedong and Kim Il-sung that he immediately replicated their propaganda styles in Romania. His totalitarian rule came to a violent end when he was overthrown and executed during the Romanian Revolution in December 1989.
