= Family Devotions =

Play written by David Henry Hwang

- Written by: David Henry Hwang
- Characters: Robert; Ama; Hannah; Chester; Wilbur; PoPo; Joanne; Jenny; DiGou
- Original language: English
- Subject: East/West cultural stereotypes; Religion; Family
- Genre: Drama
- Setting: Los Angeles; early eighties

Premiere
- Date premiered: October 18, 1981
- Place premiered: Joseph Papp Public Theater; New York City

Family Devotions is a 1981 play by American playwright David Henry Hwang. Hwang's third play depicts the clash of West and East within three generations of an assimilated Chinese-American family living in a Los Angeles suburb. The play premiered on October 18, 1981 Off-Broadway at the Joseph Papp Public Theater. It was directed by Robert Allan Ackerman, with Michael Paul Chan, Jodi Long, Lauren Tom, and Victor Wong. The play was nominated for a Drama Desk Award.

It is published as part of Trying to Find Chinatown: The Selected Plays by Theatre Communications Group. It is also in an acting edition published by Dramatists Play Service.
