= Merchandising (play) =

- Written by: David Henry Hwang
- Original language: English

Premiere
- Date premiered: 1999
- Place premiered: Actors Theatre of Louisville

Merchandising is a 1999 play by American playwright David Henry Hwang. The play was written as a special commission from the Actors Theatre of Louisville's Humana Festival. The 1999 Festival sold "T(ext) Shirt Plays" by authors such as Wendy Wasserstein, Tony Kushner, and Mac Wellman.

Hwang's play, printed on a navy blue shirt, depicted two filmmakers who lament the failure of their picture and the nature of merchandising in Hollywood.

The play was published, along with the other "T(ext) Shirt Plays" in Smith and Kraus' Humana Festival 1999: The Complete Plays.
