= Hiroshima: Out of the Ashes =

- Genre: Drama; History; War
- Written by: John McGreevey
- Directed by: Peter Werner
- Starring: Max von Sydow; Judd Nelson; Mako
- Music by: Lucia Hwong
- Country of origin: United States
- Original language: English

Production
- Executive producer: Robert Greenwald
- Producer: Mark A. Burley
- Cinematography: Neil Roach
- Editor: Robert Florio
- Running time: 100 minutes
- Production company: Robert Greenwald Productions

Original release
- Network: NBC
- Release: August 6, 1990

Hiroshima: Out of the Ashes is a 1990 American made-for-television historical war drama film about the Atomic bombing of Hiroshima. It was nominated for 2 Primetime Emmy Awards and other awards. Hiroshima: Out of the Ashes was directed by Peter Werner.

== Synopsis ==
The story follows the bombing and aftermath of the Atomic bomb dropped on the city of Hiroshima, told from several different perspectives.

== Cast ==
- Max von Sydow as Father Siemes
- Judd Nelson as Pete Dunham
- Mako as Sergeant Moritaki
- Tamlyn Tomita as Sally
- Pat Morita as Yoodo Toda
- Kim Miyori as Mrs. Ota

== Release ==
Hiroshima: Out of the Ashes was released on DVD on April 24, 2007.
