= A Very DNA Reunion =

- Written by: David Henry Hwang
- Original language: English
- Subject: DNA technology

Premiere
- Date premiered: March 8, 2010
- Place premiered: Chicago Temple Building

A Very DNA Reunion is a 2010 play by American playwright David Henry Hwang. It deals with the imprecise science of DNA technology. The play premiered as part of the production The DNA Trail: A Genealogy of Short Plays About Ancestry, Identity, and Confusions, a night of short plays. It premiered as part of the Silk Road Theatre Project on March 8, 2010 at the historic Chicago Temple Building. It was directed by Steve Scott and the production was conceived by Jamil Khoury.

It has currently not been published.
