= Yellow Face (play) =

2007 play by David Henry Hwang

- Original language: English
- Written by: David Henry Hwang
- Subject: Culture, race
- Genre: Drama
- Setting: 1990 to the present, New York City, Los Angeles, Washington, D.C., Boston, San Francisco, Guizhou Province

Premiere
- Date: May 2007
- Place: Mark Taper Forum

Yellow Face is a semi-autobiographical play by David Henry Hwang, featuring the author himself as the protagonist, DHH, mounting his 1993 play Face Value. The play's themes include questions of race and of the interaction between media and politics.

The play premiered in Los Angeles at the Mark Taper Forum in association with East West Players in May 2007. In December, it played off-Broadway at the Joseph Papp Public Theater in December 2007 and January 2008. After several other productions, it played on Broadway from September to November 2024 at Roundabout Theatre Company.

== Production history ==
=== Los Angeles, Off-Broadway and London ===
Yellow Face premiered in Los Angeles at the Mark Taper Forum in association with East West Players in May 2007.

The play opened Off-Broadway at the Joseph Papp Public Theater on December 10, 2007, and closed on January 13, 2008. Directed by Leigh Silverman, the cast featured Hoon Lee and Noah Bean as the leads, with Francis Jue as HYH and others, Kathryn Layng, Anthony Torn, Julienne Hanzelka and Kim Lucas Caleb Rooney. Hwang won his third Obie Award in Playwriting, and he was a third-time finalist for the Pulitzer Prize for Drama.

In 2013, Yellow Face made its UK debut at Park Theatre in Finsbury Park, London, on May 21, produced by Special Relationship Productions and directed by Alex Sims. This production transferred to the Royal National Theatre on May 5, 2014.

=== Later productions ===
In 2021, Yellow Face was first produced in Australia at the Kings Cross Theatre, Sydney, opening on 23 April and closing on 8 May after a sold-out run. The production was directed by Tasnim Hossain and produced by Janine Lau and Jasper Lee-Lindsay, with Shan-Ree Tan as DHH, Adam Marks as Marcus G. Dahlman, Jonathan Chan as HYH/Wen Ho Lee/others, and Kian Pitman as the Announcer/Name Withheld, together with Helen Kim, Whitney Richards and Idam Sondhi, and featuring production and costume design by Ruru Zhu, lighting design by Lucia Haddad, and music and sound design by Prema Yin. The production was nominated for six Sydney Theatre Awards in 2021, winning for Best Direction (Independent Production) and Best Performance in a Leading Role (Independent Production).

In June/July 2022, the play was produced by Theatre Raleigh in North Carolina and directed by Telly Leung. The production featured Hansel Tan as DHH, Alan Ariano as Henry Y Hwang, and Pascal Pastrana as Marcus G. Dahlman. The production also featured Lighting Design by Charlie Raschke and Scenic design by Mayuki Su.

The play was presented on Broadway by Roundabout Theatre Company for a limited run from October 1 through November 24, 2024, with previews beginning September 13. Silverman again directed, with Daniel Dae Kim portraying DHH. Joining Kim were Francis Jue reprising his role as HYH from 2007, Ryan Eggold as Marcus, Kevin Del Aguila as Actor A, Marinda Anderson as Actor B, Greg Keller as Reporter/NWOAC, and Shannon Tyo as Leah and others. The production was filmed during the final week of performances for future broadcast on PBS Great Performances. In 2025, it was nominated for the Drama League Award for Outstanding Revival of a Play, Drama Desk Award for Outstanding Revival of a Play and Tony Award for Best Revival of a Play. Daniel Dae Kim and Francis Jue were nominated for Tony Awards for Best Actor and Best Featured Actor in a Play respectively.

In 2026 the play is being produced at the Oregon Shakespeare Festival in Ashland, Oregon. It is scheduled to run from August 5, 2026 to October 23, 2026.

=== Adaptations ===
In 2013, the play was produced as a two-part YouTube video that was directed & adapted by Jeff Liu, starring Ryun Yu as DHH, Sab Shimono as HYH, and Christopher Gorham as Marcus G. Dahlman, with the rest of the cast played by Ki Hong Lee, Emily Kuroda, Linda Park, Justin James Hughes, Michael Krawic, and Tracy Winters.

Kim also portrays DHH in an audio adaptation for Audible, directed by Silverman, released on May 2, 2024. The audio adaptation stars Jason Biggs as Marcus G. Dahlman, Ashley Park as Leah Anne Cho and others, Wendell Pierce as NWOAOC and others, and Benedict Wong as HYH. The rest of the cast from the off-Broadway production (Bean, Torn, Rooney, Kim, Layng and Jue) perform additional voices, alongside Dick Cavett, Margaret Cho, Ronan Farrow, Fritz Friedman, Joel de la Fuente, Margaret Fung, Gish Jen, Jane Krakowski, Mark Linn-Baker, and Frank Rich, several of whom voice themselves.

=== Background ===
In an interview, Hwang explained: "It’s a memoir – a kind of unreliable memoir. The main character is named after me and based on me. There are some things in it that are true and there are some things in it that aren’t true. ... The story of 'Yellow Face' dates back to the 'Miss Saigon' controversy in 1990. That was when I was involved in the big casting controversy... I just naturally tend to write humorously, and for me, it’s not an issue of trying to write lines that are funny. I don’t think that works. It’s having a situation that’s inherently comic and then trying to be truthful to the character in that situation."

Though only referred to in the script as "Name Withheld On Advice Of Counsel", the Times investigative reporter whom Hwang's counterpart meets is known to be based on Jeff Gerth, which Hwang has freely acknowledged is easily determined through the list of articles quoted and referred to in the play. Gerth denies having ever spoken to Hwang, while his co-writer on the Henry Y. Hwang story Tim Golden claims Hwang exaggerated a real-life phone call the two had and denies bias in the Wen Ho Lee story, though he has acknowledged flaws in their reporting. Contrary to the character's title, Hwang censored the reporter's name while writing the play due to the belief the Times would be protective of the reporter; he briefly considered uncensoring the character's name for the 2024 Broadway production, but elected to leave it as is for dramatic purposes.

== Plot summary ==
Yellow Face opens with DHH receiving an e-mail from Marcus G. Dahlman in 2006 about his recent travels in China. DHH reflects on how Marcus disappeared from the public eye. He begins in 1990 with the controversy over the casting of Jonathan Pryce, a Welsh actor, in an Asian role in Miss Saigon as the musical transfers from London to New York City. Although DHH receives a lot of publicity about his protests against the casting and yellow face makeup, especially as the first Asian-American playwright to win a Tony Award (for M. Butterfly), the production of Miss Saigon ultimately continues without changes to the cast.

DHH then writes the play Face Value, based partly on the Miss Saigon controversy, and casts Marcus G. Dahlman as one of the lead Asian roles in his play. DHH is at first convinced that Marcus is part Asian but eventually realizes he is fully white. DHH fears he will appear hypocritical for the casting after his protest of yellow face, but is unable to fire Marcus on the basis of his race. DHH has him adopt the name "Marcus Gee" and tells the public that Marcus has Eurasian ancestry as a Jew with Siberian ancestry. Though their deception is successful, Face Value receives negative reviews and closes in previews, losing $2 million. DHH tries to move on, but he later discovers that Marcus has continued playing his role as an Asian in all parts of his life, acting in Asian roles and becoming an activist for Asian American rights. This angers DHH, who views him as an "ethnic tourist".

The play further explores DHH's relationship to his father, HYH, and the relationship of the Chinese American community to America. HYH is a successful immigrant who built the Far East National Bank in California. After contributing monetarily to political campaigns, he and others affiliated with the bank, including Wen Ho Lee, are investigated by Senator Fred Thompson, who believes they are funneling money from China to influence American politics. In the course of this, DHH and Marcus are implicated as Chinese collaborators. DHH beseeches Marcus to reveal his true identity as white, deciding he cares more about defending the Chinese American community than hiding his mistakes. Marcus ends his deception, and Thompson's investigation breaks down.

DHH's father dies in 2005, having lost faith in the American Dream. DHH and Marcus converse after their e-mails, before DHH admits to the audience that Marcus is an entirely fictional character he created to explore messy questions about race and nationality. At the character’s request, DHH writes Marcus a "happy ending" in which he moves to a small village in China and is eventually accepted into the community there.

== Casts ==
Character(s)	Los Angeles (2007)	Off-Broadway (2007)	London (2013)	Broadway (2024)
DHH	Hoon Lee	Hoon Lee	Kevin Shen	Daniel Dae Kim
Marcus G. Dahlman	Peter Scanavino	Noah Bean	Ben Starr	Ryan Eggold
Announcer / Reporter	Anthony Torn	Anthony Torn	Christy Meyer	Greg Keller
Stuart Ostrow / Rocco Palmieri / others	Lucas Caleb Rooney	Lucas Caleb Rooney	John Schwab	Kevin Del Aguila
Leah Anne Cho/others	Julienne Hanzelka Kim	Julienne Hanzelka Kim	Gemma Chan	Shannon Tyo
Jane Krakowski / Miles Newman/others	Kathryn Layng	Kathryn Layng	Davina Perera	Marinda Anderson
HYH / others	Tzi Ma	Francis Jue	David Yip	Francis Jue

== Awards and nominations ==
Year	Award	Category	Nominee	Result	Ref.
2008	Drama Desk Awards	Outstanding Featured Actor in a Play	Francis Jue	Nominated	
2008	Pulitzer Prize	Drama		Nominated	
2025	Drama Desk Awards	Outstanding Revival of a Play		Nominated	
2025	Outer Critics Circle Awards	Outstanding Revival of a Play		Nominated	
2025	Outer Critics Circle Awards	Outstanding Featured Performer in a Broadway Play	Francis Jue	Won	
2025	Tony Awards	Best Revival of a Play		Nominated	
2025	Tony Awards	Best Actor in a Play	Daniel Dae Kim	Nominated	
2025	Tony Awards	Best Featured Actor in a Play	Francis Jue	Won	

== See also ==
- Portrayal of East Asians in American film and theater
