= Icarus at the Edge of Time (multi-media presentation) =

Icarus at the Edge of Time is a multi-media presentation by composer Philip Glass to a script by Brian Greene and David Henry Hwang and film by Al + Al. It is based upon Greene's novel of the same name. It premiered at the World Science Festival on 6 June 2010.
