= Rich Relations =

1986 play by American playwright David Henry Hwang

- Written by: David Henry Hwang
- Characters: Hinson; Keith; Jill; Barbara; Marilyn
- Original language: English
- Subject: Family; Religion
- Genre: Drama
- Setting: Los Angeles; mid-eighties

Premiere
- Date premiered: April 21, 1986
- Place premiered: Second Stage Theatre; New York City, New York

Rich Relations is a 1986 play by American playwright David Henry Hwang. Hwang's first play with all non-Asian characters, it depicts the rich WASP Orr family and the damage within from parent to child, with many religious overtones. The play premiered at the McGinn-Cazale Theatre on April 21, 1986 Off-Broadway as part of the Second Stage Theatre. It was directed by Harry Kondoleon, with Phoebe Cates and Keith Szarabajka.

It is currently published by Playscripts, Inc.
