= Face Value (play) =

1993 stage play by David Henry Hwang

- Written by: David Henry Hwang
- Characters: Andrew Simpson; Linda Ann Wong; Marci Williams; Bernard Sugarman; Pastor; Glenn Ebens; Randall Lee
- Original language: English
- Subject: East/West cultural stereotypes
- Genre: Farce
- Setting: The Imperialist Theatre; New York City, New York

Premiere
- Date premiered: March 9, 1993
- Place premiered: Cort Theatre; New York City

Face Value was a 1993 play by American playwright David Henry Hwang. It was to be the second Broadway production of the playwright's work, but it closed in previews on March 14, 1993 after only 8 previews, never officially opening. The production was scheduled to open at the Cort Theatre on March 21, 1993. It was directed by Jerry Zaks, with B. D. Wong, Jane Krakowski, Mark Linn-Baker, Mia Korf, and Gina Torres in the cast. The play cost $2 million and was one of the biggest lossmakers on Broadway for a play at the time.

The first iteration premiered in early 1993 at the Colonial Theatre in Boston.

Its critical failure provided the inspiration for Hwang's Obie Award-winning play Yellow Face, which premiered in 2007 at the Mark Taper Forum and moved Off-Broadway to the Joseph Papp Public Theater. Face Value has never been published, although sections of the text are briefly presented in Yellow Face.
