= Dream of the Red Chamber (opera) =

Dream of the Red Chamber is an English-language opera in two acts composed by Chinese American composer Bright Sheng, with libretto by Sheng and David Henry Hwang. Based on the classic 18th-century Chinese novel of the same name by Cao Xueqin, the three-hour English-language opera had its world premiere on September 10, 2016, by the San Francisco Opera. The opera was reprised by the San Francisco Opera in June 2022.

== Roles ==
Role	Premiere cast, 10 September 2016
Monk / Dreamer	Randall Nakano
Stone / Bao Yu	Yijie Shi
Flower / Dai Yu	Pureum Jo
Stone (voices) / Eunuchs	Pene Pati, Alex Boyer, Edward Nelson
Flower (voices) / Ladies in Waiting	Amina Edris, Toni Marie Palmertree, Zanda Svede
Solo Maid	Zanda Svede
Granny Jia	Qiulin Zhang
Lady Wang	Hyona Kim
Bao Chai	Irene Roberts
Aunt Xue	Yanyu Guo
Princess Jia	Karen Chia-ling Ho

== Instrumentation ==
The work is scored for: 2 flutes (1 doubling on piccolo), 2 oboes (1 doubling on English horn), 2 clarinets (1 doubling on bass clarinet), 2 bassoons (1 doubling on contrabassoon), 4 horns, 3 trumpets, 3 trombones, 1 tuba, 1 timpani, 3 percussion, 1 harp, 1 qin, 39 strings (12 first violins, 9 second violins, 7 viola, 6 cellos, 5 basses); 64 total.

== Synopsis ==
=== Prologue ===
As beggars drift through the ruins of a lavish grand estate, a monk appears and begins narrating a story. He explains that he needs to tell an extraordinary story: a stone, left behind from the construction of Heaven, was nurtured by a crimson pearl flower with its dew for 3,000 years. Together, Stone and Flower look to fulfill their love by living as mortals on earth. The Monk attempts to dissuade them from such a course. But Stone and Flower disobey and travel to earth through a magic mirror.

=== Act 1 ===
Scene 1: The Grand Hall

Flower becomes Dai Yu, a sickly young woman whose mother has just died. She arrives in the home of the prestigious Jia clan. Granny Jia, Dai Yu's grandmother, loved Dai Yu's mother. However, Lady Wang, Granny Jia's daughter-in-law, dislikes the newcomer.

Stone becomes the Jia's sole male heir: Bao Yu, Lady Wang's son, a spoiled young man born with a piece of jade in his mouth. When introduced, Bao Yu and Dai Yu feel like they have met before. Envoys from the Emperor announce that Bao Yu's older sister has been promoted from concubine to the rank of Princess. For generations, the Jia clan has owed a huge debt to the Imperial Court. Princess Jia's promotion suggests the Emperor is willing to make peace.

Scene 2: Dai Yu's chamber

Later that night, Bao Yu hears Dai Yu playing the qin, a string instrument. They begin to write poems together, but her skill is superior. They resolve to transform the world with music.

Scene 3: Pear court pavilion

Time passes and the seasons change. Lady Wang invites her niece, the beautiful Bao Chai, and her mother Aunt Xue from the wealthy Xue clan into their home. Aunt Xue is seeking entry into high society, while her sister Lady Wang is looking for money to repay the imperial debt. They are looking to match their children with one another. Bao Yu is attracted to Bao Chai's beauty but dislikes her practicality. Granny hopes that Bao Yu will marry Dai Yu.

Scene 4: Bao Yu's chamber

Bao Yu has an erotic dream in which both Dai Yu and Bao Chai both appear. Though attracted to Bao Chai, he feels Dai Yu is his soul mate.

Scene 5: The Grand Hall

Princess Jia arrives home for a visit. She tells her mother Lady Wang that she feels the palace is filled with her enemies and she won't be able to hold on to her position. The Emperor wants Bao Yu to marry Bao Chai, and the Princess gives them matching gifts to symbolize this wish. Lady Wang is delighted, Granny is upset, and Dai Yu is thrown into despair. Bao Yu resolves that his love to Dai Yu will triumph.

=== Act 2 ===
Scene 1: Bamboo grove

Dai Yu's health continues to decline. On the bank of the lake, she buries falling peach blossom petals. Bao Yu overhears her and is moved. She teases him about the Princess's wish for him to marry Bao Chai and storms off. She overhears Bao Yu declaring his continued devotion to her.

Scene 2: Princess Jia's quarters at the palance / Granny's chamber

Princess Jia writes a letter to her family telling them that she has lost her position and will be dead by the time they read the letter. The Jia clan can save themselves only if Bao Yu marries Bao Chai for her wealth. Granny Jia falls ill and declares she wants her grandson to marry Dai Yu. Granny Jia dies and the clan goes into mourning.

Scene 3: A hall in the estate

Lady Wang, the new head of the clan, orders her son to carry out the Emperor's wishes and marry Bao Chai. This is the only way to repay the imperial debt. She sends Dai Yu to the other side of the lake, but Bao Yu remains defiant.

Scene 4: Far side of the lake / Bamboo grove

Dai Yu burns the poems she wrote with Bao Yu. Bao Yu stands up to Lady Wang and tells his mother that he will become a monk. Lady Wang agrees to let Bao Yu marry Dai Yu.

Scene 5: The Grand Hall

At the wedding, Bao Yu exchanges vows with the veiled Dai Yu. Once they are married, Bao Yu discovers he has been tricked into marrying Bao Chai. Suddenly, imperial soldiers storm into the Grand Hall and confiscate all the properties of the Jia and Xue clans. The Emperor is revealed to have encouraged the marriage so that he could seize both fortunes. The soldiers burn the estate.

Scene 6: Lake / Monk's room The Monk reveals that he is Bao Yu's older self, writing his own life story. After the wedding, Dai Yu slowly walks into the lake, where she disappears. What is left of the Jia family become beggars and wander through the illusion known as life.
