= Golden Child (play) =

1996 play by David Henry Hwang

- Playbill cover of 1998 Broadway production
- Original language: English
- Written by: David Henry Hwang
- Characters: Eng Siu-Yong; Andrew Kwong; Eng Tieng-Bin; Elizabeth Kwong; Eng Eling; Reverend Anthony Baines; Eng Luan; Eng Ahn and others
- Subject: Religion/Family
- Genre: Drama
- Setting: Manhattan and Eng Tieng-Bin's home village near Amoy, in Southeast China. The Present, Winter 1918 and Spring 1919.

Premiere
- Date: November 19, 1996
- Place: Public Theater; New York City, New York

Golden Child is a play by American playwright David Henry Hwang. Produced off-Broadway in 1996, it was produced on Broadway in 1998. It explores an early twentieth-century Chinese family being faced with Westernization. It was nominated for a Tony Award for Best Play.

== Productions ==
Golden Child is a co-production with the South Coast Repertory, (Costa Mesa, California) and the Public Theater. The play premiered Off-Broadway on November 19, 1996, at the Joseph Papp Public Theater, closing on December 8, 1996. It was directed by James Lapine, with Tsai Chin and Jodi Long. The production won the 1996-1997 Obie Awards: Performance, Tsai Chin, and Playwriting, David Henry Hwang.

The play was revised for the production at the South Coast Repertory, where it ran in January 1997, again directed by Lapine. According to an article in the Los Angeles Times,

"Hwang has improved it--if not miraculously, than at least discernibly. He has added cogency to the short framing scenes that begin and end the story, and several other key scenes are clearer and stronger. As a result, "Golden Child" is more riveting and more moving, though it continues to suffer in part from over-explanation."

The play next had engagements at the Singapore Repertory Theatre in January 1998, and the American Conservatory Theater in San Francisco in February 1998 to March 15, 1998.

The play premiered on Broadway at the Longacre Theatre on April 2, 1998, and closed on May 31, 1998. This production was also directed by Lapine, with Randall Duk Kim and Ming-Na Wen in addition to Long. It was nominated for the 1998 Tony Award for Best Play, as well as Costume Design (Play or Musical) (Martin Pakledinaz) and Featured Actress in a Play (Julyana Soelistyo).

East West Players, whom Hwang was a frequent collaborator with, also hosted the play as a part of their 1999–2000 season.

An Off-Broadway revival opened on November 13, 2012, as part of a season of Hwang's works at the Signature Theatre. This production was directed by Leigh Silverman and featured Annie Q., Jennifer Lim, Julyana Soelistyo, and Greg Watanabe.

It is published by Theatre Communications Group and also in an acting edition published by Dramatists Play Service.

== Plot ==
In the present, Andrew Kwong is visited in his sleep by his dead grandmother, Eng Ahn. Andrew's wife Elizabeth is pregnant and Andrew is conflicted about it.

Ahn tells him about his great-grandfather, Eng Tieng-Bin, who was a Chinese businessman in 1918. After spending time in the Philippines with Westerners, Tieng-Bin desires a modern life. He has returned to his home in rural China, where he has three wives—Eng Siu-Yong, Eng Luan, and Eng Eling—and a daughter, Eng Ahn, who calls herself the "Golden Child." Tieng-Bin, who has been meeting with a Christian missionary, Rev. Anthony Baines, wishes to convert to Christianity and adopt a more Westernized lifestyle, but that puts him at odds against his family and traditions. After arguing about it with his wives, Tieng-Bin orders that Ahn's feet be unbound, considering it to be a backward and inhumane practice.

In Act II, Tieng-Ban has Ahn and his wives meeting with Rev. Baines to learn about Christianity. Eng Luan embraces the religion as she hopes to become Tieng-Ban's only wife when he converts and has to choose among the three. Tieng-Bin feels most fondly for Eling, who is now pregnant, but she is conflicted about leaving the old traditions behind. Siu-Yong, addicted to opium, rejects Tieng-Bin's wishes to convert, and has Ahn spy on her husband's sessions with the reverend. When Tieng-Bin learns this, he destroys Siu-Yong's family altar. Luan and Eling are baptized along with Tieng-Bin, but Siu-Yong dies of an opium overdose. The ghost of Siu-Yong visits Eling and convinces her she will never be able to become fully Western like Tieng-Bin wants, and so Eling sacrifices herself and her unborn child. Ahn confronts a devastated Tieng-Bin and encourages him to continue pursuing a Western life for the benefit of the family.

Back in the present, Andrew is afraid he'll fail as a father and husband like Tieng-Bin, but Ahn explains that despite his suffering, Tieng-Bin did bring his family into the future. His actions allowed her to come to America, become educated, choose her own husband and be a Christian. Andrew resolves to write about his family history and finally starts to feel a fondness for his unborn child.

== Critical reception ==
The reviewer of the 2012 Off-Broadway production wrote: " 'Golden Child' is loosely based on the story of Hwang's Chinese great-grandfather's conversion to Christianity in the early years of the 20th century. Written with insight, compassion, and a sharp eye for the unintended consequences of clashing cultures, 'Golden Child' is one of Hwang's best works, as entertaining as it is thought-provoking... Under Leigh Silverman's perceptive direction, the cast does superb ensemble work.

== Awards and nominations ==
=== Original Broadway production ===
Year	Award	Category	Nominee	Result
1998	Tony Award	Best Play		Nominated
1998	Tony Award	Best Featured Actress in a Play	Julyana Soelistyo	Nominated
1998	Tony Award	Tony Award for Best Costume Design	Martin Pakledinaz	Nominated
