= Peer Gynt (1998 adaptation) =

- Written by: David Henry Hwang; Stephan Muller
- Characters: Peer Gynt; Ase; Mads Moen; Solveig; Troll King and others
- Original language: English
- Subject: Selfishness; Love
- Genre: Drama
- Setting: Gynt family farm and many others

Premiere
- Date premiered: February 3, 1998
- Place premiered: Trinity Repertory Company; Providence

Peer Gynt is a 1998 theatrical adaptation of Norwegian playwright Henrik Ibsen's classic play Peer Gynt by American playwright David Henry Hwang and Swiss director Stephan Muller. Combining many contemporary references with a streamlined turn of the original story, it was commissioned by the Trinity Repertory Company in Providence, Rhode Island. It opened there on February 3, 1998.

The script is published by Playscripts, Inc.
