= 1988 Academy Awards =

1988 Academy Awards may refer to:

- 60th Academy Awards, the Academy Awards ceremony that took place in 1988
- 61st Academy Awards, the 1989 ceremony honoring the best in film for 1988
