= The Great Helmsman (play) =

- Original language: English
- Written by: David Henry Hwang

Premiere
- Date: April 30, 2007
- Place: Joseph Papp Public Theater

The Great Helmsman is a 2007 play by American playwright David Henry Hwang. It deals with two women who are debating who will be chosen for a night with Chairman Mao Zedong. The play premiered as part of the production Ten, a night of short plays. It premiered April 30, 2007, at the Joseph Papp Public Theater. It was directed by Lloyd Suh.

It is published as part of 2007: The Best Ten-Minute Plays for Three or More Actors by Smith and Kraus.
