= Blind Alleys =

Play by David Henry Hwang and Frederic Kimball

Blind Alleys was a play written by David Henry Hwang and Frederic Kimball, filmed and aired as a 1985 television special produced by WCVB-TV for Metromedia. It is the story of two people once linked by an interracial marriage setting up for their daughter's wedding. The film features Pat Morita, Cloris Leachman, and co-writer Kimball.

== Plot summary ==
Fran and Kenji, a US Army veteran, were married for twenty years after eloping together, until Kenji ran away a couple of years ago. As the play begins, their daughter is scheduled to be married in a few days at the bowling alley owned together by Fran and Woody, Fran's friend and business partner, but she will not proceed with the wedding if her father is not present to give her away. Fran finds Kenji, who is working at a nursing home for elderly Japanese-Americans. Kenji and Fran argue, and she kicks him in the shins before leaving.

Stricken by guilt, Kenji shows up at the wedding, where he is accosted by the groom's small-town parents; the groom's father, a dealer of John Deere farm equipment, is worried about competition from Japanese manufacturers. Kenji has a temper tantrum and attempts to wreck the bowling alley.

== Cast ==
- Cloris Leachman as Fran
- Pat Morita as Kenji
- Frederic Kimball as Woody
- June Angela as the daughter

== Production ==
The film was directed by Bill Cosel and David Wheeler; it was co-written by pre-eminent Asian American dramatist Hwang and Kimball. The film was videotaped in Boston in June 1984.

The film is not available on DVD or videocassette.
