= FOB (play) =

1980 David Henry Hwang play

- Revival by Asian American Theater Company
- Original language: English
- Written by: David Henry Hwang
- Characters: Dale; Grace; Steve
- Subject: East/West cultural stereotypes
- Genre: Drama
- Setting: Los Angeles; early eighties

Premiere
- Date: June 8, 1980
- Place: Joseph Papp Public Theater; New York City

FOB is a 1980 Obie Award-winning play by American playwright David Henry Hwang. His first play, it depicts the contrasts and conflicts between established Asian Americans and "fresh off the boat" (FOB) newcomer immigrants.

== Production history ==
The play premiered at the Stanford Asian American Theatre Project in 1979 under the direction of the author and was further developed at the National Playwrights Conference at the Eugene O'Neill Theater Center in July 1979.

It received its professional debut on June 8, 1980 Off-Broadway at the Joseph Papp Public Theater, closing on July 13, 1980. It was directed by Mako, with Calvin Jung, Ginny Yang, and John Lone in the cast and Tzi Ma as a stage manager. According to William C. Boles (professor of English at Rollins College in Winter Park, Florida), "for a first-time play premiering off-Broadway, FOB received fairly complimentary notices." Joseph Papp supported Hwang's work, producing his first four plays.

The play was revived Off-Broadway at the Pan Asian Repertory Theater at Playhouse 46 in May 1990, directed by Hwang. The play was produced by the Asian American Theater Company, San Francisco, California at the Magic Theatre, with direction by Mitzie Abe from March 24 to April 10, 2005.

It is published as part of Trying to Find Chinatown: The Selected Plays by Theatre Communications Group and also in an acting edition published by Dramatists Play Service.
