= David Henry Hwang =

American playwright (born 1957)

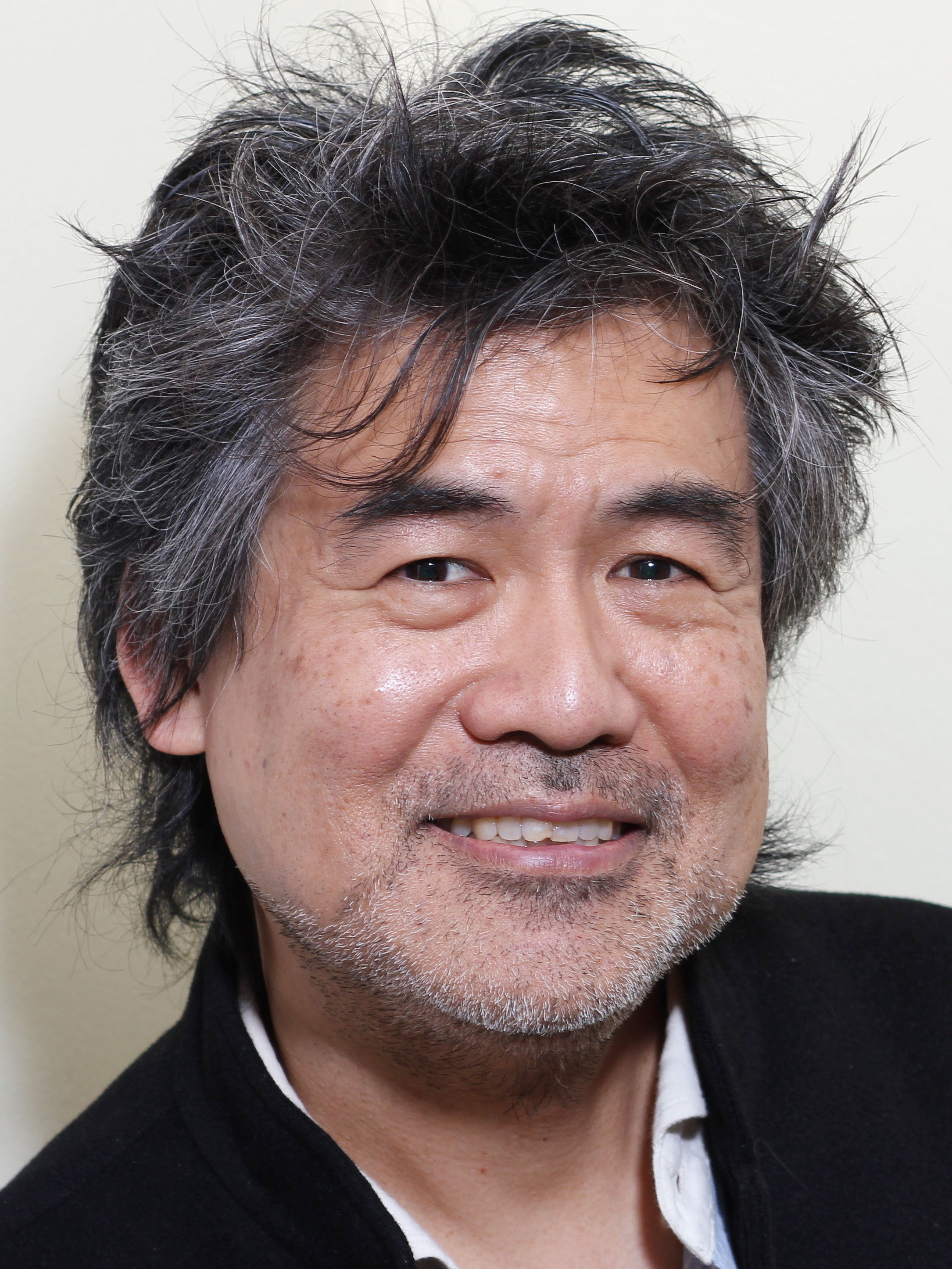
- Hwang in 2013
- Born: August 11, 1957 (age 69); Los Angeles, California, U.S.
- Education: Stanford University (BA); Yale University (MFA)
- Occupations: Playwright, screenwriter, television writer, librettist, lyricist
- Spouses: Ophelia Y. M. Chong (m. 1985; div. 1989); Kathryn Layng (m. 1993)
- Children: 2
- Writing career
- Period: 1980–present
- Genre: Drama
- Subjects: Asian-American Identity; Gender Politics
- Notable works: FOB; The Dance and the Railroad; Family Devotions; M. Butterfly; Golden Child; Flower Drum Song (revival); Yellow Face; Chinglish; Soft Power
- Movement: Contemporary Drama

David Henry Hwang
- Traditional Chinese: 黃哲倫
- Simplified Chinese: 黄哲伦
Transcriptions
Standard Mandarin
- Hanyu Pinyin: Huáng Zhélún
- Gwoyeu Romatzyh: Hwang Jerluen
- Wade–Giles: Huang Chelun
- IPA: [xwǎŋ ʈʂɤ̌lwə̌n]
Yue: Cantonese
- Jyutping: Wong4 Zit3leon4

David Henry Hwang (born August 11, 1957) is an American playwright, librettist, screenwriter, and theater professor at Columbia University in New York City. He has won three Obie Awards for his plays FOB, Golden Child, and Yellow Face. He has one Tony Award (M. Butterfly) and three other nominations (Golden Child, Flower Drum Song, and Yellow Face). Three of his works (M. Butterfly, Yellow Face, and Soft Power) have been finalists for the Pulitzer Prize for Drama.

== Early life ==
He was born in 1957 in Los Angeles, California, to Henry Yuan Hwang, the founder of Far East National Bank, and Dorothy Hwang, a piano teacher. The oldest of three children, he has two younger sisters. He received a bachelor's degree in English from Stanford University in 1979 and attended the Yale School of Drama between 1980 and 1981, taking literature classes. He left once workshopping of new plays began, since he already had a play being produced in New York. His first play was produced at the Okada House dormitory (named Junipero House at the time) at Stanford University after he briefly studied playwriting with Sam Shepard and María Irene Fornés. In summer 1978, he studied playwriting with Sam Shepard and attended Padua Hills Playwrights Festival, both of which led him to write his first plays such as FOB.

== Career ==
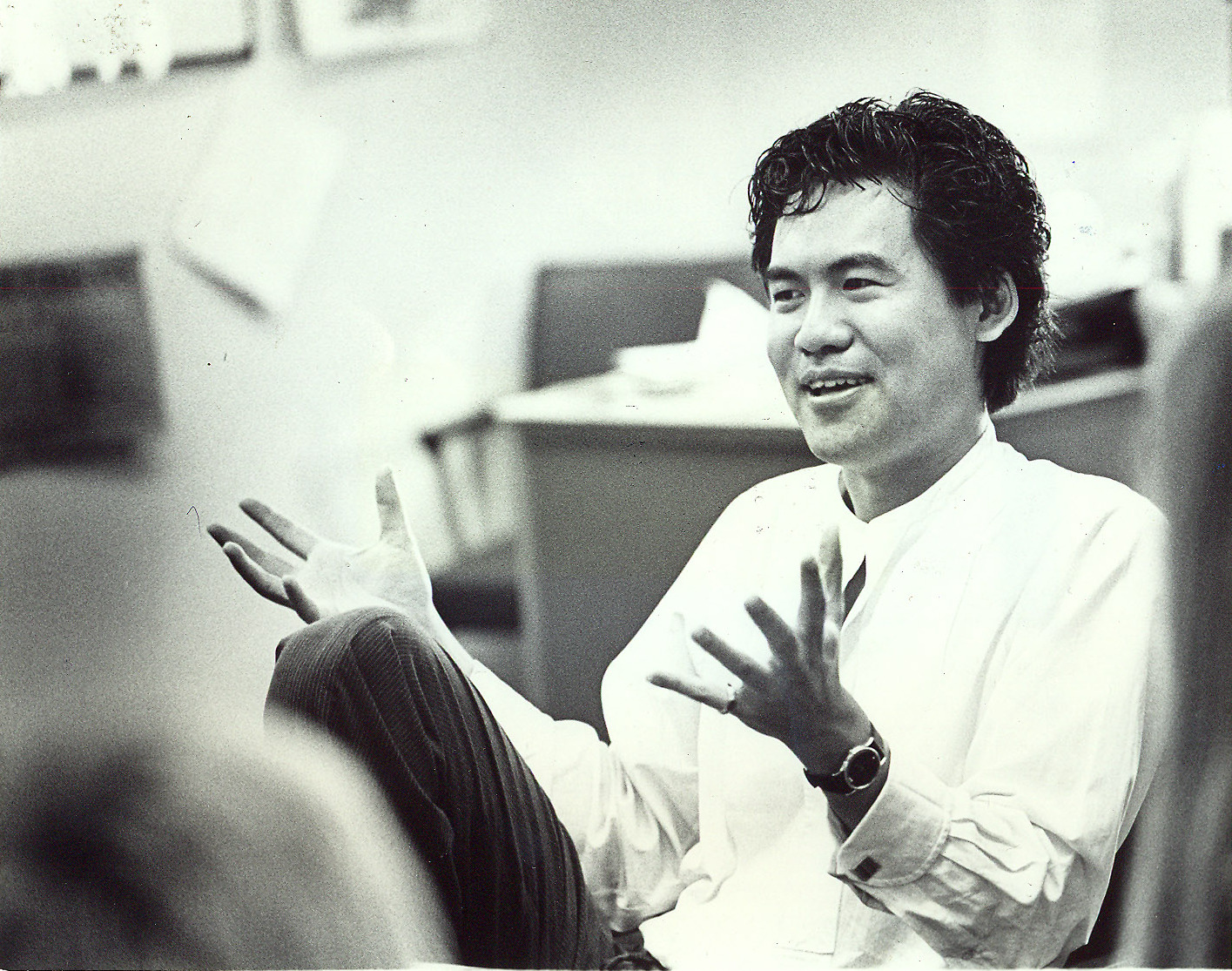
Playwright David Henry Hwang teaching a writing class in San Francisco's Fort Mason in 1979

=== Trilogy of Chinese America ===
Hwang's early plays concerned the role of the Chinese American and Asian American in the contemporary world. His first play, FOB, explores the contrasts and conflicts between established Asian Americans and "Fresh Off the Boat" new immigrants. The play was developed by the National Playwrights Conference at the Eugene O'Neill Theater Center and premiered in 1980 Off-Broadway at the Joseph Papp Public Theater. In 1981 it won an Obie Award for Best New American Play. Papp produced four more of Hwang's plays, including two in 1981: The Dance and the Railroad, which tells the story of a former Chinese opera star working as a coolie laborer in the 19th-century American West, and Family Devotions, a darkly comic take on the effects of Western religion on a Chinese-American family. This was nominated for the Drama Desk Award. Those three plays added up to what the author described as a "Trilogy of Chinese America."

=== Branching out / national success ===
After this, Papp also produced the show Sound and Beauty, the omnibus title to two Hwang one-act plays set in Japan. At this time, Hwang started to work on projects for the small screen. A television movie, Blind Alleys, written by Hwang and Frederic Kimball and starring Pat Morita and Cloris Leachman, was produced in 1985 and followed a television version of The Dance and the Railroad.

His next play Rich Relations, was his first full-length to feature non-Asian characters. It premiered at the Second Stage Theatre in New York.

Hwang's best-known play was M. Butterfly, which premiered on Broadway in 1988. The play is a deconstruction of Giacomo Puccini's opera Madama Butterfly, alluding to news reports of the 20th-century relationship between French diplomat Bernard Boursicot and Shi Pei Pu, a male Chinese opera singer. Shi purportedly convinced Boursicot that he was a woman throughout their twenty-year relationship. The play won numerous awards for Best Play: a Tony Award (which Hwang was the first Asian American to win), the Drama Desk Award, the John Gassner Award, and the Outer Critics Circle Award. It was the first of three of his works to become a finalist for the Pulitzer Prize for Drama.

=== Work post-Butterfly ===
The success of M. Butterfly prompted Hwang's interests in many other different directions, including work for opera, film, and the musical theatre. Hwang became a frequent collaborator as a librettist with the world-renowned composer Philip Glass.

One of M. Butterfly's Broadway producers, David Geffen, oversaw a film version of the play, which was directed by David Cronenberg. Hwang also wrote an original script, Golden Gate, which was produced by American Playhouse. Hwang wrote an early draft of a screenplay based upon A. S. Byatt's Booker Prize-winning novel Possession, which was originally scheduled to be directed by Sydney Pollack. Years later, director/playwright Neil LaBute and Laura Jones would collaborate on the script for a 2002 film.

Throughout the 1990s, Hwang continued to write for the stage, including short plays for the famed Humana Festival at the Actors Theatre of Louisville. His full-length Golden Child, received its world premiere at South Coast Repertory in 1996. Golden Child was later produced in New York City. It won a 1997 Obie Award for playwriting for Hwang's 1996 off-Broadway production. In 1998 it was produced on Broadway, and was nominated that year for a Tony Award for Best Play.

=== Return to Broadway ===
In the new millennium, Hwang was asked by director Robert Falls to help co-write the book for the musical Aida (based upon the opera by Giuseppe Verdi). In an earlier version, it had failed in regional theatre tryouts. Hwang and Falls re-wrote a significant portion of the book (by Linda Woolverton). Aida (with music and lyrics by Elton John and Tim Rice) opened in 2000 and proved highly profitable.

His next project was a radical revision of Richard Rodgers, Oscar Hammerstein, II, and Joseph Fields' musical Flower Drum Song. The musical, which had been adapted from the novel The Flower Drum Song by C. Y. Lee, tells a story of the culture clash encountered by a Chinese family living in San Francisco. Although the original Broadway production had a successful run from Dec 1, 1958 to May 7, 1960, and a Hollywood film version was released in 1961, some felt the musical had become dated. The Rodgers and Hammerstein Organization allowed Hwang to significantly rework the plot even as he retained character names and songs. While his 2002 revision won him his third Tony nomination, the show, directed by Robert Longbottom, received mixed reviews and ran for only 169 performances and 25 previews on Broadway. It later toured nationally. Whereas the original production of Flower Drum Song had cast some non-Asians in leading roles, including Caucasians and an African-American (Juanita Hall), the 2002 production featured an all-Asian cast of actor-singers.

=== Back to The Public ===
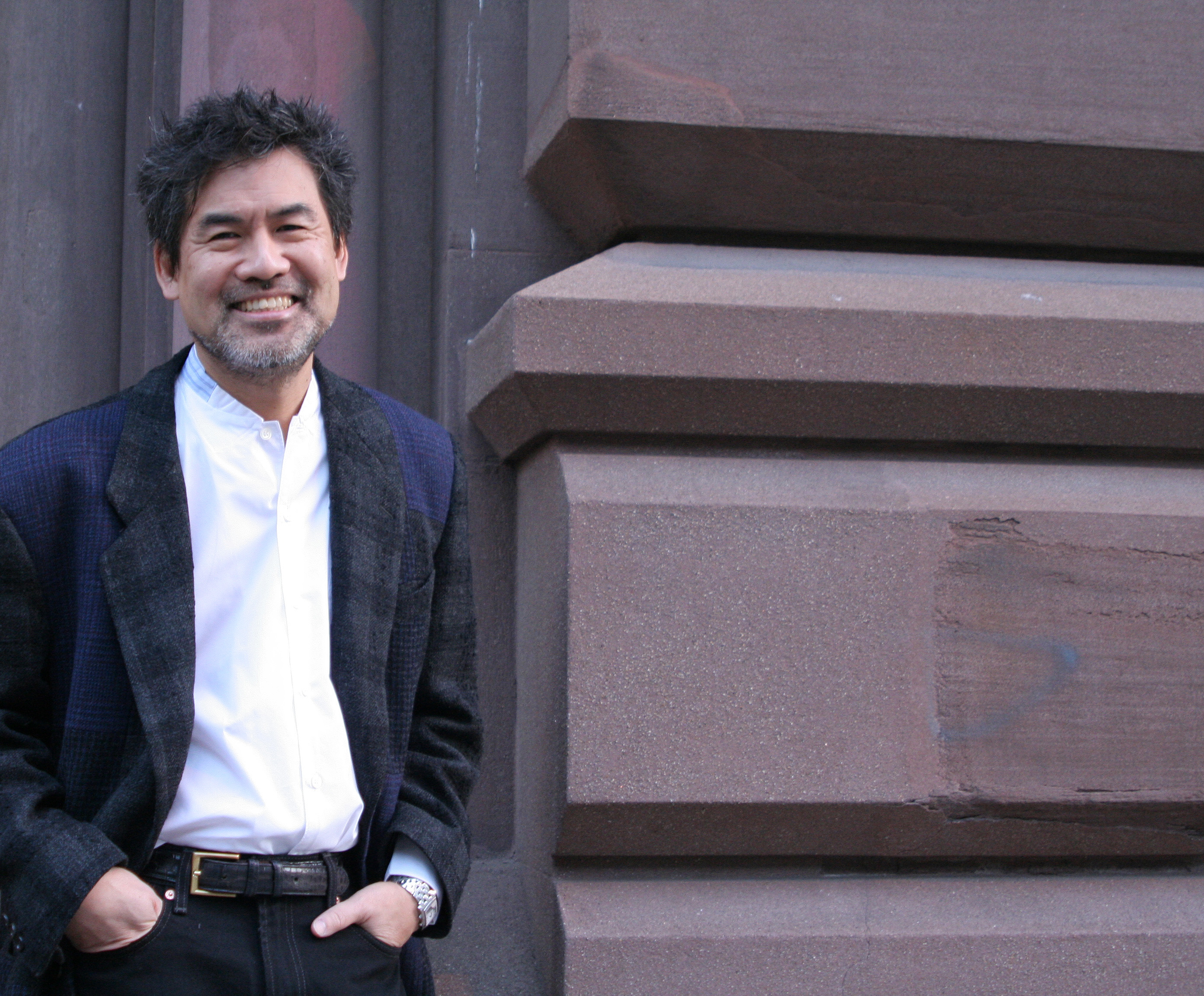
David Henry Hwang at the Public Theater in New York City in 2008

Hwang's 2007 play Yellow Face relates to his play Face Value, which closed in previews on Broadway in the early 1990s. He wrote it in response to a controversy about the casting of Jonathan Pryce in a Eurasian role in Miss Saigon. Face Value, which included music and lyrics for a musical-within-a-play by Hwang, lost millions of dollars. It was a stumbling block in the careers of Hwang and producer Stuart Ostrow.

In Yellow Face, Hwang wrote a semi-autobiographical play, featuring him as the main character in a media farce about mistaken racial identity. This had been also an important element in Face Value.

Yellow Face premiered in Los Angeles in 2007 at the Mark Taper Forum as a co-production with East West Players. It moved Off-Broadway to the Joseph Papp Public Theater, an important venue for Hwang's earlier work. It enjoyed an extended run at the Papp, and won Hwang his third Obie Award for Playwriting. The play was a finalist for the Pulitzer Prize for Drama.

Hwang also wrote a new short play, The Great Helmsman for the Papp's night of plays: Ten.

=== Opera ===
Hwang has continued to work steadily in the world of opera and musical theatre, and has written for children's theatre as well. Hwang co-wrote the English-language libretto for an operatic adaptation of Lewis Carroll's Alice in Wonderland with music (and part of the libretto) by the Korean composer Unsuk Chin. It received its world premiere at the Bavarian State Opera in 2007 and was released on DVD in 2008.

Hwang wrote the libretto to Howard Shore's opera The Fly, based on David Cronenberg's 1986 film of the same name. The opera premiered on July 2, 2008, at the Théâtre du Châtelet in Paris, France, with Cronenberg as director and Plácido Domingo conducting.

Hwang wrote the libretto for Tarzan, a musical based on a film by Walt Disney Pictures, which was produced on Broadway.

Hwang also collaborated on the multi-media event Icarus at the Edge of Time, adapted from Brian Greene's novel of the same name. It featured music by Philip Glass and a film by "Al and Al." The piece premiered as part of the World Science Festival.

After its major success at Chicago's Goodman Theatre, Hwang's play, Chinglish, quickly made its way to Broadway in October 2011. It won the Joseph Jefferson Award. Chinglish was largely inspired by Hwang's frequent visits to China and his observations of interactions between Chinese and American people. Ticket sales of Chinglish were conservative.

Hwang's short play A Very DNA Reunion was written for the evening of plays The DNA Trail, which was conceived by Jamil Khoury and premiered at the historic Chicago Temple Building.

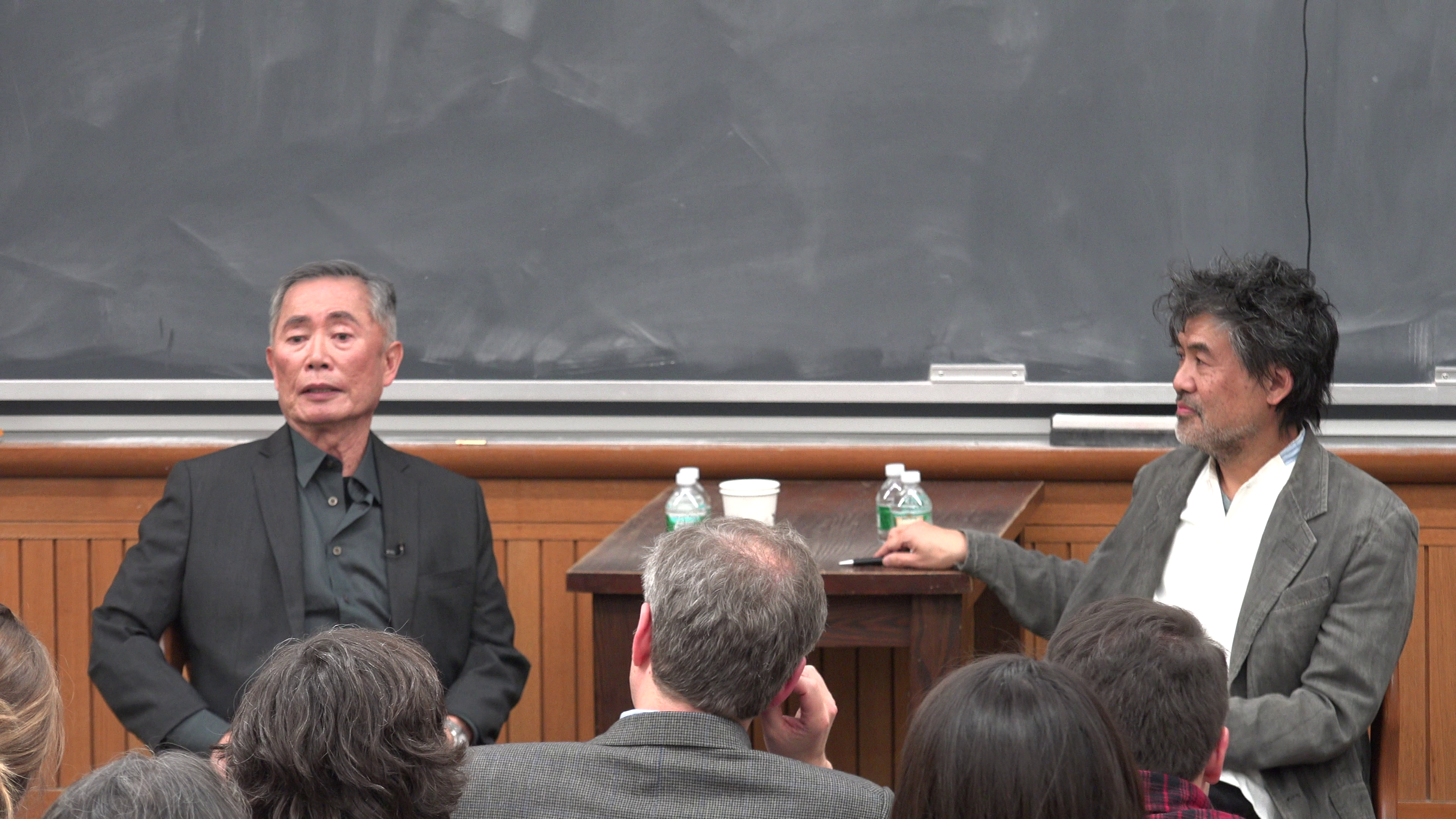
David Henry Hwang and George Takei discussing Allegiance musical at Columbia University in late 2015

=== Since 2010 ===
Hwang worked on a theatrical commission for the Oregon Shakespeare Festival and Arena Stage in Washington, DC. This was a musical version of Aimee Mann's album The Forgotten Arm, with Mann and Paul Bryant. He also worked on screenplays for DreamWorks Animation and directors Justin Lin and Jonathan Caouette. In 2013, a production of Yellow Face premiered on YouTube. It was directed and adapted by Jeff Liu, and featured Sab Shimono among other actors.

In 2014 two new Hwang plays were premiered. The first, Kung Fu, about the life of Bruce Lee, premiered as part of his residency at the Signature Theatre Off-Broadway. The play opened February 24, 2014 in a production directed by Leigh Silverman, and featuring Cole Horibe, who had gained fame in the TV series, So You Think You Can Dance. The second was Cain and Abel, one of many plays included in The Mysteries, a re-telling of Bible stories. Conceived by Ed Sylvanus Iskander, The Mysteries also featured the work of playwrights Craig Lucas, Dael Orlandersmith, Jose Rivera, and Jeff Whitty.

In 2014, Hwang joined the Playwriting Faculty of the Columbia University School of the Arts Theatre Program. He was appointed the director of the Playwriting Concentration and will serve as an Associate Professor of Theatre in Playwriting. Hilton Als of the New Yorker has described him as "the most successful Chinese American playwright this country has produced."

From 2015 to 2019, Hwang became a writer and consulting producer of the Golden Globe-winning television series The Affair and in 1993 wrote a song "Solo" in association with Prince.

In the fall of 2016, the San Francisco Opera premiered Dream of the Red Chamber, an opera by Hwang and Bright Sheng, based on the eighteenth-century Chinese novel of the same name. He previously served as the chair of the board of the American Theatre Wing.

In the Spring of 2018, Hwang's Soft Power premiered at the Ahmanson Theatre in Los Angeles, California. The music and additional lyrics are by Jeanine Tesori. Its cast is largely Asian. It transferred to Off-Broadway at the Public Theater in September 2019 (previews). In May 2020, it was a finalist for the Pulitzer Prize for Drama, making Hwang the first person to be a three-time finalist without winning.

== Works ==
=== Plays ===
- FOB (1980)
- The Dance and the Railroad (1981)
- Family Devotions (1981)
- The House of Sleeping Beauties (1983) (based on Yasunari Kawabata's novella House of the Sleeping Beauties)
- The Sound of a Voice (1983)
- As the Crow Flies (1986)
- Rich Relations (1986)
- M. Butterfly (1988)
- Bondage (1992)
- Face Value (1993)
- Trying to Find Chinatown (1996)
- Bang Kok (1996)
- Golden Child (1996)
- Peer Gynt (1998) (based on the play by Henrik Ibsen, co-written with Stephan Muller)
- Merchandising (1999) (Humana Festival T[ext] Shirt play)
- Jade Flowerpots and Bound Feet (2001)
- Tibet Through the Red Box (2004) (based on Peter Sis' book)
- The Great Helmsman (2007)
- Yellow Face (2007)
- A Very DNA Reunion (2010)
- Chinglish (2011)
- Kung Fu (2014)

=== Musical theater ===
- Book for Aida (1998) (music by Elton John, lyrics by Tim Rice; libretto co-written by Linda Woolverton and Robert Falls, based on the opera by Giuseppe Verdi)
- Revised book for a revival of Flower Drum Song (2002) (music by Richard Rodgers, lyrics by Oscar Hammerstein, II, based upon the novel by C. Y. Lee and original book by Joseph Fields)
- Book for Tarzan (2006) (music and lyrics by Phil Collins, based on the novel by Edgar Rice Burroughs and the Walt Disney Pictures film)
- Book and lyrics for (2018) Soft Power (music and additional lyrics by Jeanine Tesori)
- Book for Particle Fever (2027) (music and lyrics by Bear McCreary and Zoe Sarnak)

=== Opera libretti ===
- 1000 Airplanes on the Roof (1988) (music by Philip Glass)
- Venus Voodoo (1989) (music by Lucia Hwong)
- The Voyage (1992) (music by Philip Glass; libretto in English, Latin, and Spanish, based on Glass' story)
- The Silver River (1997) (music by Bright Sheng)
- The Sound of a Voice (2003) (music by Philip Glass; based on Hwang's play of the same name)
- Ainadamar (2003) (music by Osvaldo Golijov; libretto in Spanish)
- Alice in Wonderland (2007) (music by Unsuk Chin), libretto co-written by Chin, based on the books by Lewis Carroll)
- The Fly (2008) (music by Howard Shore; based on the film by David Cronenberg)
- An American Soldier (2014; rev. 2018) (music by Huang Ruo)
- Dream of the Red Chamber (2016) (music by Bright Sheng; libretto co-written with Sheng, based on the novel by Cao Xueqin
- Circus Days and Nights (2021) (music by Philip Glass; libretto co-written with Tilde Bjorfors, based on the book by Robert Lax and a concept by Bjorfors)
- The Rift (2022) (music by Huang Ruo)
- M. Butterfly (2022) (music by Huang Ruo; based on Hwang's M. Butterfly)
- The Monkey King (2025) (music by Huang Ruo; based on Journey to the West)

=== Film/television ===
- The Dance and the Railroad (Source of Adaptation only)
- Blind Alleys (with Frederic Kimball)
- Forbidden City, U. S. A. (Assistant only)
- Forbidden Nights (story, with Tristine Rainer, based on Judith Shapiro's article "The Rocky Course of Love in China")
- Homes Apart: Korea
- M. Butterfly (based on Hwang's play)
- Golden Gate
- Picture Bride (Script Advisor only)
- The Monkey King (more commonly known as The Lost Empire)
- Possession (with Laura Jones and Neil LaBute, based on the novel by A. S. Byatt)
- Sound of a Voice (Source of Adaptation only)
- Bondage (Source of Adaptation Only)
- White Frog (Executive Producer and Actor only)
- The Affair (Consulting Producer, Writer of episodes "206", "209", "303", "405")
- Trying to Find Chinatown (based on Hwang's play)

=== Other ===
- Sunday Sermon (monologue)
- Yellow Punk Dolls (live dance; choreography by Ruby Shang, music by John Zorn)
- Dances in Exile (dance film; choreography by Ruby Shang, film by Howard Silver, music by David Torn, for Alive from Off Center)
- Come (song "Solo;" co-written with Prince)
- After Eros (live dance; choreography by Maureen Fleming, music by Philip Glass)
- Icarus at the Edge of Time (multi-media presentation; music by Philip Glass, film by Al+Al, co-written with Brian Greene, based on Green's novel)
- Yellow Face (YouTube video; Source of Adaptation only)
- Yellow Face (Audible Drama; Source of Adaptation only)
- Cain and Abel (2014) (short play, part of The Mysteries, a collaboration with 47 other playwrights that retells The Bible in 51 plays)

=== Forewords/introductions/other texts ===
- Red Scarf Girl: A Memoir of the Cultural Revolution
- Asian American Drama: 9 Plays from the Multiethnic Landscape
- Robot Stories and More Screenplays
- The Flower Drum Song
- The State of Asian America: Activism and Resistance in the 1990s
- The Monkey King (Source of Adaptation Only)
- Murder in San Jose (Translation Adaptation Only)

== Honors/recognition ==
Hwang has been awarded fellowships from the National Endowment for the Arts, a Guggenheim Fellowship and Rockefeller Foundations, the New York State Council on the Arts, and the Pew Charitable Trusts. He has been honored with awards from the Asian American Legal Defense and Education Fund. In 1998, the nation's oldest Asian American theatre company, the East West Players, christened its new mainstage The David Henry Hwang Theatre. Hwang was featured in an autobiographical series by Boise State University with a summary of his early work, as part of the Western Writers Series, written by Douglas Street. In 2011, Hwang received the PEN/Laura Pels International Foundation for Theater Award as a Grand Master of American Theater. In 2012, he was awarded the William Inge Award for Distinguished Achievement in the American Theatre, the Asia Society Cultural Achievement Award, the China Institute Blue Cloud Award, and the Steinberg Distinguished Playwright Award. In 2014, he received the Doris Duke Artist Award. In 2015, he received the 2015 ISPA Distinguished Artist Award.

From 1994 to 2001, Hwang served by appointment of President Bill Clinton on the President's Committee on the Arts and the Humanities.

Hwang holds honorary degrees from Columbia College Chicago (1998), the American Conservatory Theater (2000), Lehigh University (2011), University of Southern California (2013), and State University of New York at Purchase (2015).

In 2012, Hwang was named a Fellow of United States Artists.

In 2015, Hwang was named a Ford Foundation Art of Change Fellow.

In 2018, Hwang earned induction into the American Theater Hall of Fame.

== Personal life ==
Hwang was married to Ophelia Chong from 1985 until their divorce in 1989. In 1993, he married actress Kathryn Layng. They have two children together.

Hwang served on the board of directors for Far East National Bank founded by his father Henry Yuan Hwang. In 1999, American regulators investigated some of the bank's transactions with Chinese banks as possible funding for illegal campaign contributions, Chinese espionage, and other possibilities, but the results were inconclusive. In 1989, Hwang's father hired then-Los Angeles mayor Tom Bradley as a consultant who received a loan from the bank, helping it secure $2 million from city funds. When this became a major scandal in the city, however, Bradley returned his $18,000 in payments, and resigned from the consulting work. Hwang addresses his father's controversies in his semi-autobiographical 2007 play Yellow Face.

In November 2015, Hwang was the victim of a stabbing near his home in Fort Greene, Brooklyn. The assailant stabbed Hwang in the neck, severing his vertebral artery, before running from the scene. Hwang was seriously injured and underwent surgery before being discharged from the hospital. The attack appeared to be random, as nothing was taken; the assailant was never found. Hwang wrote about the experience in The New York Times. The stabbing also inspired a semi-autobiographical portion of Soft Power, in which the lead character, also named David Henry Hwang, is the victim of a random stabbing.

Hwang endorsed Democratic presidential nominee Kamala Harris in the 2024 presidential election.

== Selected published work ==
- Broken Promises, New York: Avon, 1983. (out-of-print; includes FOB, The Dance and the Railroad, Family Devotions, and The House of Sleeping Beauties)
- M. Butterfly, New York: Plume, 1988. (Acting edition published by Concord Theatricals; audio version available from L. A. Theatre Works; film version available from Warner Bros.)
- 1,000 Airplanes on the Roof, Salt Lake City: Peregrine Smith, 1989. (Original Music Recording available from Virgin Records)
- Between Worlds: Contemporary Asian-American Plays, New York: Theatre Communications Group, 1990. (includes Hwang's As the Crow Flies and The Sound of a Voice)
- FOB and Other Plays, New York: New American Library, 1990. (out-of-print; includes FOB, The Dance and the Railroad, The House of Sleeping Beauties, The Sound of a Voice, Rich Relations and 1,000 Airplanes on the Roof)
- Audition Monologs for Student Actors, Englewood: Merriweather Publishing, 1995. (includes Hwang's Sunday Sermon)
- On a Bed of Rice: An Asian American Erotic Feast, New York: Anchor Books, 1995. (includes Hwang and Prince's Come)
- Golden Child, New York: Theatre Communications Group, 1998. (Acting edition published by Concord Theatricals)
- Trying to Find Chinatown: The Selected Plays, New York: Theatre Communications Group, 1999. (includes FOB, The Dance and the Railroad, Family Devotions, The Sound of a Voice, The House of Sleeping Beauties, Bondage, The Voyage, and Trying to Find Chinatown)
- Humana Festival 1999: The Complete Plays, New Hampshire: Smith and Kraus, 1999. (include Hwang's Merchandising)
- Rich Relations, New York: Playscripts, Inc., 2002.
- Flower Drum Song, music by Richard Rodgers, lyrics by Oscar Hammerstein II, book by David Henry Hwang; based upon the libretto by Oscar Hammerstein, II and Joseph Fields and the novel The Flower Drum Song by C. Y. Lee; New York: Theatre Communications Group, 2003. (Broadway Cast Recording available from DRG)
- 2004: The Best Ten-Minute Plays for Two Actors, New Hampshire: Smith and Kraus, 2003. (includes Hwang's Jade Flowerpots and Bound Feet)
- Peer Gynt (with Stephan Muller), based upon the play by Henrik Ibsen; New York: Playscripts, Inc., 2006.
- Tibet Through the Red Box, based upon the book by Peter Sis; New York: Playscripts, Inc., 2006.
- 2007: The Best Ten-Minute Plays for Three or More Actors, New Hampshire: Smith and Kraus, 2008. (includes Hwang's The Great Helmsman)
- Yellow Face, New York: Theatre Communications Group, 2009. (Acting edition published by Concord Theatricals)
- Chinglish, New York: Theatre Communications Group, 2012. (Acting edition published by Concord Theatricals.
- M. Butterfly (Broadway Revival Version), New York: Plume, 2017. (Acting edition published by Concord Theatricals).
- Yellow Face (Broadway Version), New York: Theatre Communications Group, 2026.
