= List of Vietnamese animated films =

A list of animated films produced in Vietnam in decade order :

== 1950s - 1960s ==
- Soon it will rain (1959)
- The Welldeserved Fox (1960)
- Con một nhà (1961)
- A Rabbit goes to school (1962)
- Bi Bô and Hòa
- A wish (1963)
- A flower with five petals
- A wonderful island
- A dream
- A flower dream
- Bõm
- A tree of carambola
- Đêm trăng Rằm
- The bee soldiers
- Mưu chống càn
- A farm baby and a tiger
- Em bé hái củi và chú Hươu con
- Little Cat (1965)
- Bài ca trên vách núi (1967)
- A starling who can speak (1967)
- I became to the mason (1967)
- The warm jackets (1968)

== 1970s ==
- A tale of Saint Giong (1970)
- The baby girl and the flowerpot (1971)
- A child was hard-working at Geography (1971)
- Chú đất nung
- A story of Jade Rabbit
- A crocodile was itched in his teeth
- Bee, Butterfly, Ant (1972)
- A little rooster (1973)
- A monkey who losed kind (1973)
- Thăng Long's Fire Dragon (1973)
- Drongo and Hawk (1973)
- A bud of green leaf (1973)
- Lật Đật and Phồng Phềnh (1973)
- The giant hand (1973)
- A forest of flowers (1974)
- Little Shrimp and Actinia
- And ant and a grain of rice
- Thạch Sanh (1976)

== 1980s ==
- Ông Trạng thả diều (1981)
- Turning-point (1982)
- All ones who must fear (1983)
- The tale of a mosquito
- Please buy my onion ?
- A tree by Sika Deer's horn
- Quả trứng lưu lạc

== 1990s ==
- Bộ đồ nghề nổi giận
- The talent caver-man (1992)
- Catfishes and Toads (1993)
- Phép lạ hồi sinh (1994)
- Munias and Koels
- Making a house between a lake
- How to fragrant as a flower
- A red umbrella (1999)

== 2000s ==
- Sự tích rước đèn Trung thu (2000)
- Rabbit and Wolf (2000)
- A bike (2000)
- The tale of a stilt house (2000)
- Bike and Car (2002)
- A story about two pots (2003)
- Yellow Cicada and Fire Cricket (2003)
- The adventure of Yellow Bee (2003)
- Vietnamese martial arts (2003)
- A story of shoes (2003)
- The photocopied boy
- A fairy-wings chicken
- The soiled chicken
- A time water-well (2005)
- Life
- Tít and Mít (2005)
- A dream of Green Frog (2005)
- Frogs split the moon (2005)
- Leaf and Hair (2005)
- Two crickets (2005)
- An old tale of Co Loa Citadel (2005)
- Olimpie Brow Knight (2006)
- Pieces of heart (2006)
- The Polish shoe (2007)
- The most beautiful lamp (2009)
- Cồ and Chíp (2009)
- The winter story (2009)
- Lu and Bun (2009)
- A valley with yellow grass (2009)
- The Rabbit and the Tortoise (2009)
- A duck egg (2009)
- There is a little toad (2009)
- Dưới một mái nhà (2009)
- The legend of the waterfall Đa Rơ Ga (2009)
- The fish losed their drove (2009)
- A tale of Widow's Island (2009)
- The winter memory (2009)
- The Flight Odonata (2009)
- A little ruse (2009)
- The Quail makes a nest (2009)
- A time bank (2009)
- A mission in April (2009)
- A wish of Bi (2009)
- The Detective 004
- Trời cũng phải đánh
- The Dalmatians
- Join in ant-hole

== 2010s ==
- Cánh diều họa mi (2010)
- The son of Dragon God (2010)
- Cầu vồng chắn mưa (2010)
- Gã mèo mướp (2010)
- Up in the tree (2010)
- Một cuộc đua tài (2010)
- A leaf (2010)
- Friendship (2010)
- Sơn Tinh - Thủy Tinh (2010)
- Who is an idiot one ? (2010)
- Finding happiness (2010)
- The Green Jacker Night (2010)
- The gray toad (2010)
- Cổ vật đêm rằm (2010)
- A dream in Co Loa Citadel (2010)
- A legend about ocean waves (2010)
- Vũ điệu ánh sáng (2011)
- In the Shade of Trees (2011)
- The pond has wings (2011)
- Say Hi to Pencil ! (2011)
- The little matchgirl (2011)
- Chiếc cầu xoay (2011)
- A peacock's hair (2011)
- A monster of lotus lake (2011)
- Chilldren are so (2011)
- Awaken (2017)
- The Silver iOn Squad (2018)
- Broken Being: Prequel (2019)

== 2020s ==
- Lớp Học Mật Ngữ : Show Your Star (2020)
- Thỏ Bảy Màu (2021)
- Dế Mèn: Cuộc phiêu lưu tới Xóm Lầy Lội (2025)
- Trạng Quỳnh nhí: Truyền thuyết Kim Ngưu (2025)

== See also ==
- History of Vietnamese animation
