= Flowerpot (disambiguation) =

A flowerpot is a container in which flowers and other plants are cultivated and displayed.

Flowerpot or flower pot may also refer to:

- Flowerpot, Tasmania, a locality in Australia
- Flowerpot Bay, Chatham Islands, New Zealand
- Flowerpot Formation, a geologic formation in Oklahoma, U.S.
- Flowerpot Island, Ontario, Canada
- Flowerpot Men (disambiguation)
- Flowerpot parasol, a species of gilled mushroom (Leucocoprinus birnbaumii)
- Flowerpot Snake, a blind snake species found in Africa and Asia (Ramphotyphlops braminus)
- Flowerpot technique, used in sleep deprivation studies

== See also ==
- The Baby Girl and the Flowerpot, Vietnamese short animated film
- Jade Flowerpots and Bound Feet, American short play
