= Belling the Cat (film) =

Belling the cat Đeo lục-lạc cho mèo
- Directed by: Lê Bình
- Written by: Đinh Tiếp; Aesop (fable)
- Music by: Đặng Duy Chiến
- Production company: Vietnam Animation Studio
- Distributed by: Vietnam Animation Studio
- Release date: 2014
- Running time: 10 minutes
- Country: Vietnam
- Language: Vietnamese

Belling the Cat (Vietnamese: Đeo lục-lạc cho mèo) is a 2014 Vietnamese animated film, directed by Lê Bình. The plot is based on the Aesop's fable Belling the cat.

== Award ==
- Silver Kite prize – Vietnam Film Festival XIX (2015)
