= Subsidy period =

1975 to 1986 in Vietnam

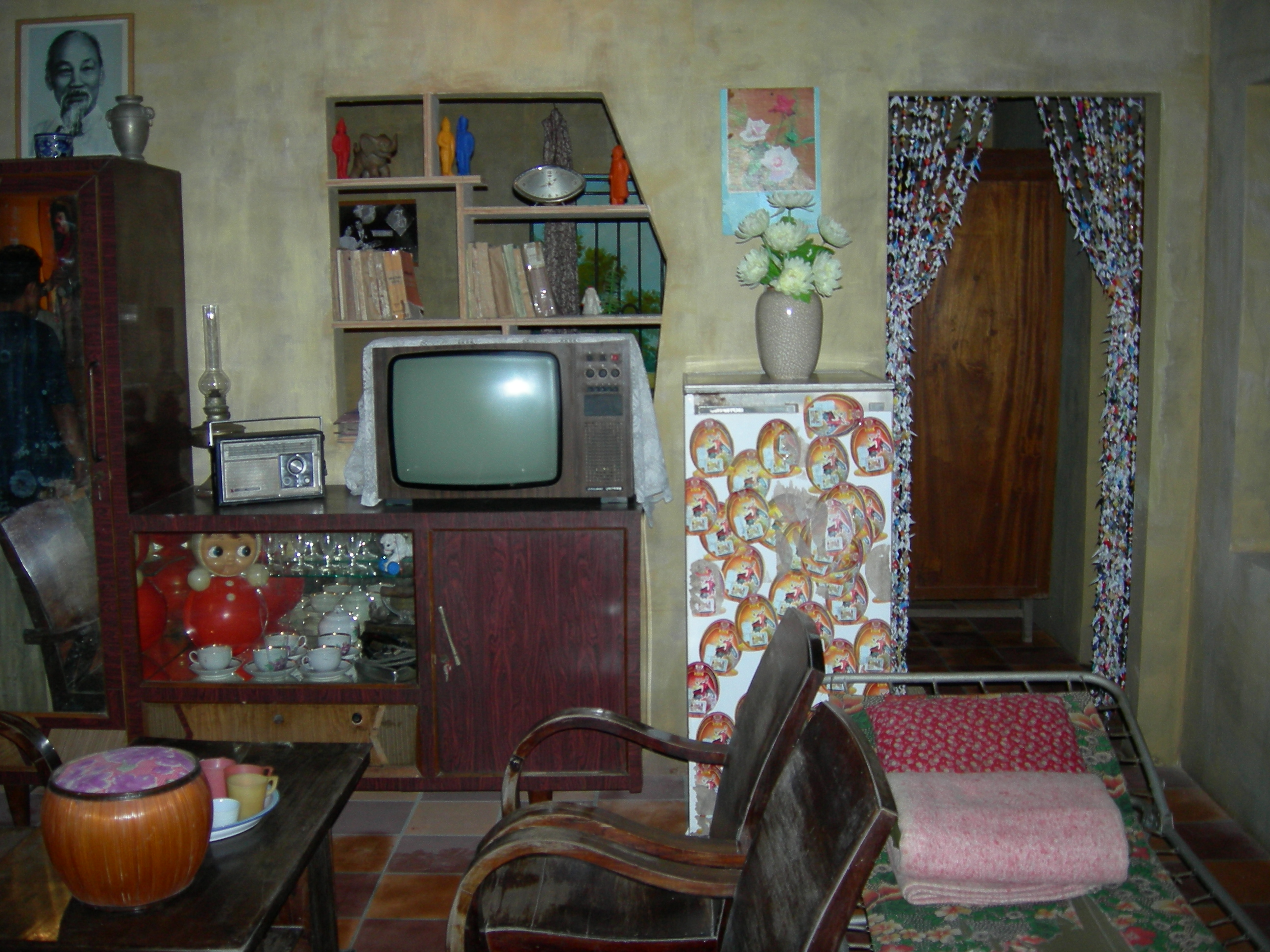
A room with items typical of the subsidy period.

Thời bao cấp (lit. 'subsidy period') generally refers to the period between 1975 and 1986, when all of Vietnam operated under a command economy from the end of the Vietnam War until the onset of the Đổi Mới economic reforms. Although North Vietnam's economy had been under command economy since 1954, this period is generally not regarded as belonging to the bao cấp era, with South Vietnam having operated under a separate economic system.

In this planned economy, most private merchants were eliminated, goods were distributed through a ration coupon system managed entirely by the state, and restrictions were placed on people buying and selling on the open market or transporting goods from one region to another. The state monopolized the distribution of most goods and restricted cash transactions. The family registration system was established during this period to distribute food and other commodities on a per capita basis, most notably through rice ration books that specified the quantity and types of goods that could be purchased.

== Economy ==
=== Economic management mechanism ===
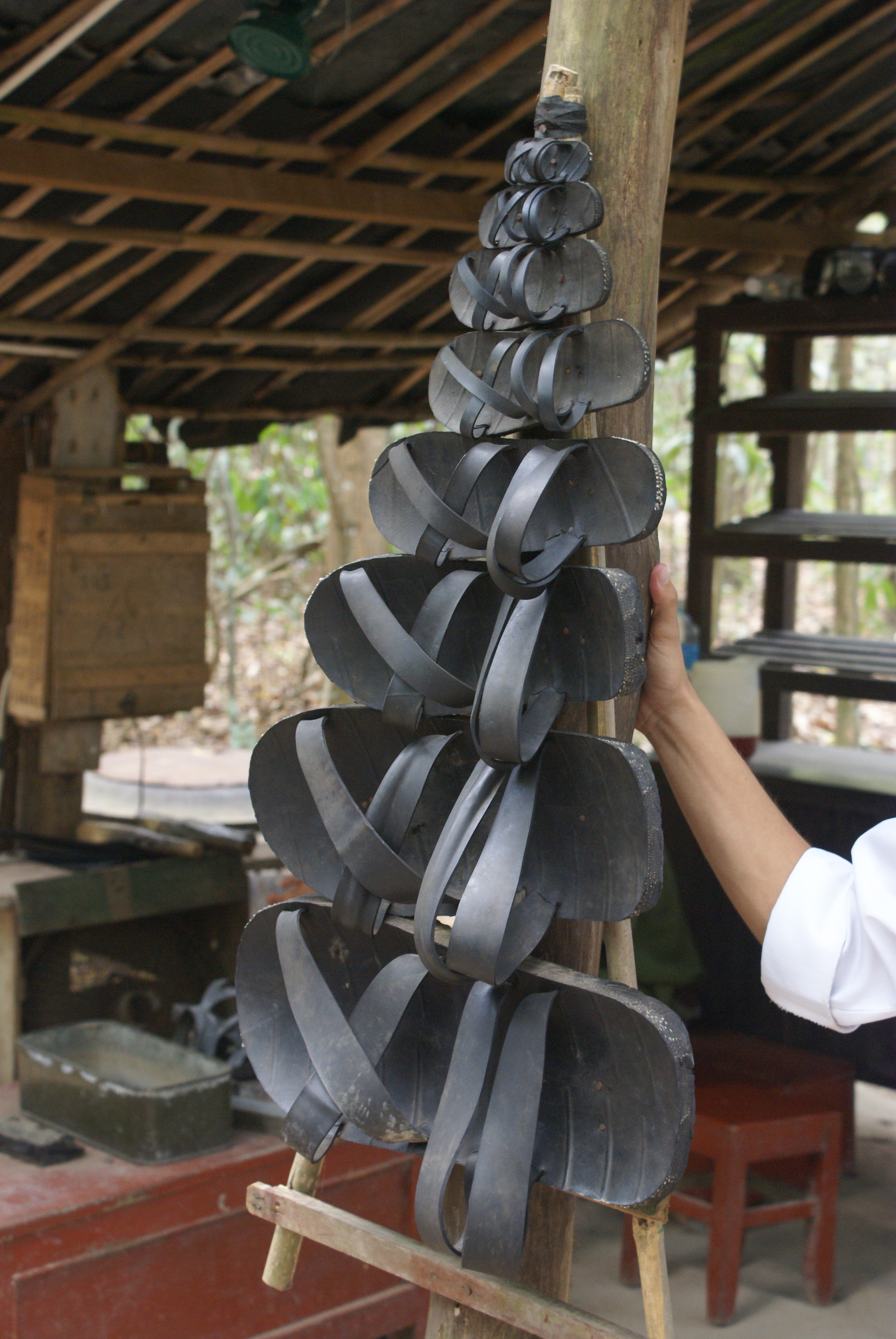
Rubber sandals made from old car tires were commonly used during the war and the following subsidy period.

Before the Đổi Mới reforms, Vietnam's economy was managed using a centralized planning system with the following characteristics:

- The state managed the economy primarily through administrative orders based on a detailed system of legal targets imposed from the top down. Enterprises operated on the basis of decisions made by competent state agencies and the legal targets assigned to them. All methods of production, materials, capital, product pricing, organizational structure, personnel, and wages were decided by the relevant authorities. The state assigned targets for capital and material allocation to enterprises, and enterprises delivered their products to the state. If there was a loss, the state would compensates; and in exchange if profits were made, the state would collect them.
- Administrative agencies intervened too deeply in the production and business activities of enterprises but did not bear any material or legal responsibility for their decisions. Any material damage caused by the decisions of administrative agencies would instead be borne by the state budget. Enterprises had no autonomy in production and business, nor were they bound by any responsibility to meet any targets or achieve certain results.
- The relationship between commodities and money was neglected and considered a formality, giving predominance to a bartering system. As the state managed the economy through a “distribution-submission” system, many important commodities such as labor, inventions, and important means of production were not legally considered commodities.
- The management structure involved many inefficient intermediate levels that were considered authoritarian and bureaucratic, all while enjoying better benefits than the workers.

During the 10 years of the subsidy period, Vietnam was able to execute two phases: 5 years of phase II (1976–1980) and 5 years of phase III (1981–1985). The Vietnamese state did not recognize commodity production and free market, and instead regarded a planned economy as the most important feature of a socialist state. Free market was viewed as a characteristic of capitalism, leading to a de facto non-recognition of the existence of a multi-sector economy during the transition period.

Vietnam prioritized state-owned and collective enterprises, seeking to rapidly eliminate private ownership and the private sector. The economy fell into stagnation and crisis as Vietnam followed Soviet-type economic planning without truly understanding its advantages and disadvantages, lacking the capacity to leverage its strengths and mitigate its weaknesses.

=== Forms of subsidies ===
==== Subsidies through prices and quantities of goods ====
The state determined the value of assets, equipment, supplies, and goods at a level significantly lower than their market value. As such, economic accounting was merely considered a formality during this period.

Amount of rice purchasable by worker type
Type of worker	rice (kg)/month
1 year old child	3
farmer	11-15
government worker	13
manual laborer	13-19
soldier	21

Manual laborers were given 20 kg of rice per month, while government workers were eligible for 13 kg. Due to rice shortages, the population had to supplement their diet with extra corn, sweet potatoes, cassava, and job's tears. The rice portion was supplied by the central government, while the supplementary portion is managed by local authorities, who added additional food such as 10 kg of cassava or sweet potato for every 13 kg of rice. Even with money, goods were extremely scarce, and even people with ration coupons who line up to buy, might not have any goods left to purchase by the time their turn came. Goods were not only of poor quality, but also very limited in quantity. In practice, there were only enough goods to use for a short period of time, and by the end of the month, people often had to buy extra on the black market.

Foreigners in Vietnam had the right to shop for certain items at separate state-owned stores such as Intershop in Hanoi, which offered special items such as canned goods and wine.

The main sources of supplementary food were the Soviet Union, India, among other countries who provided aid, and some transactions were carried out under barter agreements. Indonesia also agreed to sell 200,000 tons of rice to Vietnam on credit. Furthermore, Vietnam borrowed 300,000 tons of wheat from India, but due to their limited milling capacity, they were unable to produce flour in time and had to negotiate with India to get extra help milling wheat. Vietnam received 70% of the flour, with the remainder considered milling waste and payment for their services. The Ministry of Food asked Mr. Jean-Baptiste Doumeng, director of Ipitrade Company and a member of the French Communist Party who was friendly with Vietnam, to help find a source of supply. He subsequently helped purchase 500,000 tons of Thai rice with cash to sell on credit to Vietnam.

Other than consumer goods, during the subsidy period, the government also controlled the distribution of housing, with the standard being four square meters per person. Apartment complexes, similar to those in the Soviet Union, were built in cities and allocated to mid-level officials and workers. The Housing Department was responsible for repairing damaged housing, but poor management led to encroachment on public land, making it difficult to distinguish between public and private property. Life in these collective housing blocks was made even worse by residents keeping livestock in cramped, unsanitary apartments. Thanks to the subsidy economy, housing prices in cities were relatively cheap, but workers and civil servants still could not afford to buy because their incomes were too low.

==== Subsidies through ration coupons ====
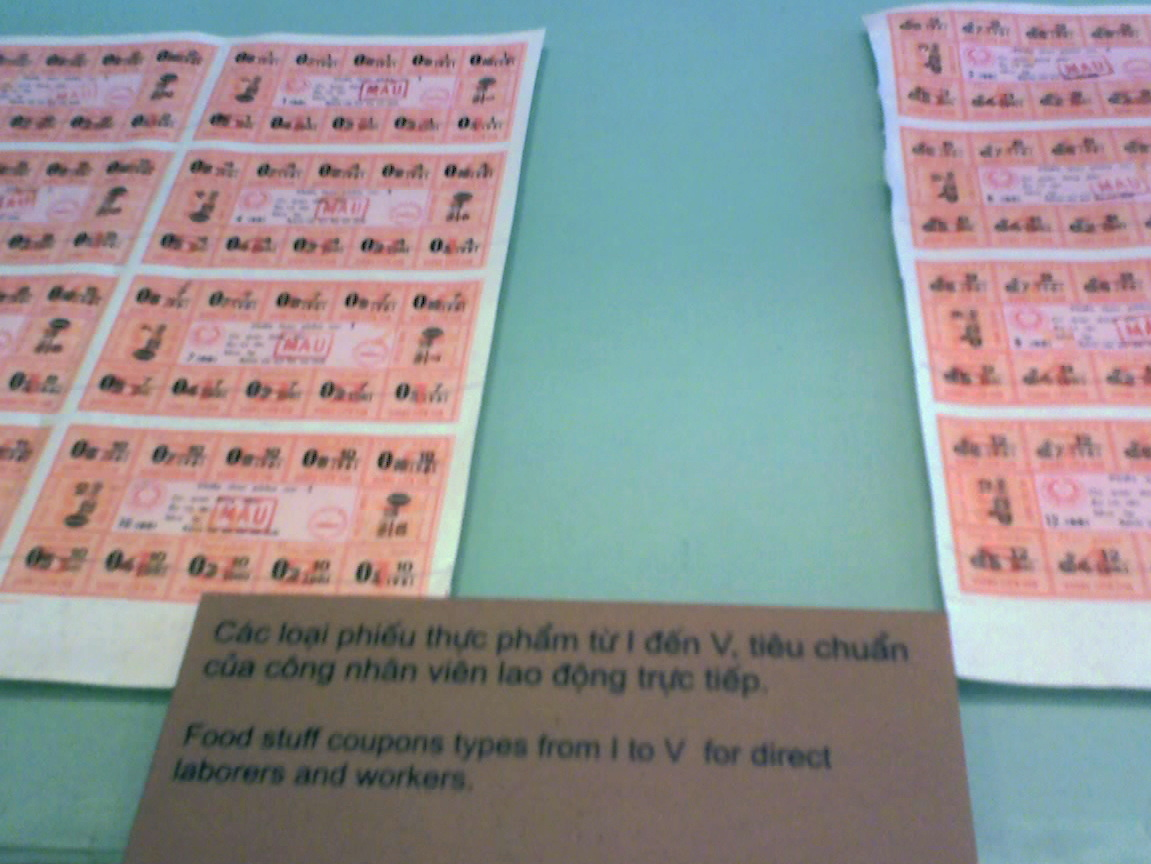
Ration coupons during the subsidy period

The state regulated the distribution of consumer goods to government officials and workers according to quotas through ration coupon tickets. The ration coupon system, with prices far below market rates, transformed wages into a system of payment in kind, eliminating incentives for workers and undermining the principle of earnings according to labor. The Democratic Republic of Vietnam began implementing rice ration books around 1960, initially for food, and later adding ration coupons for all essential goods. The focus of the subsidy period was on ration coupons that specified the types and quantities of goods that people were allowed to purchase, based on certain criteria such as rank and seniority. Some groups received preferential treatment, allowing them priority in purchasing. For example, ordinary citizens were only allowed to buy 1.5 kg of pork per month, but senior officials had the right to buy 6 kg per month. Batteries, fabrics, bicycle parts, sugar, condensed milk, fuel, fish sauce, lard, and salt all required ration coupons to purchase.

Depending on their job position and professional characteristics, government officials and civil servants, as well as working people, were issued food ration coupons under a separate system.

Senior officials received the A1 special standard, ministers received A coupons, vice ministers received B coupons, heads of departments, bureaus, and institutes received C coupons and had access to exclusive stores on Tông Đản Street, Nhà Thờ Street, and Vân Hồ Street (Hanoi). This led to a popular rhyme:

Tông Đản là của vua quan / Nhà Thờ là của trung gian nịnh thần / Đồng Xuân là của thương nhân / Vỉa hè là của nhân dân anh hùng!

Tông Đản Street belongs to the Emperor and his mandarins / Nhà Thờ Street belongs to the flattering courtiers / Đồng Xuân Market belongs to the merchants / and the sidewalks belongs to the heroic people!

==== Subsidies under the capital allocation system ====
There were no sanctions imposing liability on capital-allocated units. This increased the burden on the budget and led to inefficient capital use, giving rise to a “begging-granting” mechanism.

=== The role of currency ===
Essential goods purchasable from the state for mid-level officials
product	quantity/month
pork or lard	3 lạng (approx. 300 grams)
fish sauce	1,5 liters
vegetables	3–5 kg
fuel	4 liters

Due to a shortage of goods during the subsidy period, distribution of goods was primarily orchestrated through a system of ration coupons. Items could be purchased on the black market, but this was not the main channel of distribution. Purchased items were associated with a corresponding ration coupon. A notable side effect of the subsidy economy period was the devaluation of the Vietnamese currency. Workers' wages were sometimes paid in kind because the continuous decline of the currency. Wages in 1980 had decreased by 51.1% in value compared to wages in 1978. By 1984, that amount had become only 32.7%.

The free market was considered illegal and was restricted, as such goods circulating on the black market were scarce and very expensive. Consequently, people and government workers often sold consumer goods they did not use on the black market.

=== Agriculture ===
After 1975, with an average distribution standard of 9 kg of rice per person per month, the 4 million urban residents needed 530,000 tons of rice annually. However, this amount could not be guaranteed because the state could only mobilize more than 1 million tons per year nationwide, while that rice had to be used to feed a large standing army on top of being distributed to urban residents. The state could only provide urban residents with the minimum amount of food and supplies necessary for sustenance. During the period of state-controlled distribution, there was a paradox: city dwellers had a lower quality diet than rural residents, while in other countries, urban areas usually had a higher standard of living than rural areas.

==== 1976–1980 period ====
After Vietnam's reunification, agriculture in the North was collectivized, with most farmers joining cooperatives, while in the South the collectivization movement developed rapidly but was not sustained. In 1976, the Politburo of the Communist Party of Vietnam issued Directive No. 43, which stated: “Eliminate exploitation in rural areas, guide farmers toward agricultural collectivization, advance toward socialism, and promote the collective ownership rights of the working people.” After this directive was issued, the movement to establish agricultural cooperatives in rural areas was implemented throughout southern Vietnam. The majority of farmers were incorporated into cooperatives and production groups.

By 1978, the Government Council had issued a decision on “completely abolishing all forms of capitalist exploitation of land and promoting land reform in rural areas of the South,” according to which any rural household owning more than 0.5 hectares would have their land expropriated by the state at a price equal to two years' worth of the annual yield of the main crop on the expropriated area. After having their land expropriated, peasant households were able to join cooperatives. Households without land could be allocated no more than 3,000 square meters per person, and were encouraged to join cooperatives. By the end of 1979, 91.6% of farming households in the South Central Coast had joined cooperatives; in South Vietnam, there were 13,246 production groups, of which over 4,000 were struggling and gradually dissolved. The state also collectivized tractors and engines under 26 horsepower, organizing them into mechanized tools within cooperatives. Engines with 26 horsepower or more were organized into agricultural machinery groups managed by the district People's Committees, with collective ownership of the machines and members paid according to their labor. The state also organized land reclamation, under the New Economic Zones program with the participation of 1.5 million urban residents and the army in order to reduce population pressure in cities.

Despite considerable efforts, this period failed to meet the targets set. Rice production in 1976 reached 11.827 million tons, gradually declining to 9.79 million tons by 1978. In 1976, the average rice yield per capita was 211 kg, but by 1980 it had fallen to only 157 kg. The 1976–1980 five-year plan aimed to nearly double the total rice yield to around 21 million tons, but by 1980 it had only reached 14.4 million tons, or 68.5% of the plan. The production of the entire southern rice granary fell from 1.9 million tons in 1976 to 0.99 million tons in 1977 and 0.64 million tons in 1979. Pig farming achieved 58.5% of the target, fisheries achieved nearly 40%, roundwood harvesting achieved 45%, and deforestation achieved 48%. Vietnam fell into a state of food shortage, having to import and receive food aid from allied communist countries, the United Nations, and the West. Vietnam stood on the brink of famine, and the country would have starved if there had been widespread crop failure.

==== 1981–1985 period ====
By the end of 1985, the South had established 363 cooperatives and 36,220 production groups, attracting 74% of farming households. The forced cooperative movement was implemented hastily, and resulted in 70% of agricultural cooperatives being average or poor, with many cooperatives disbanding, farmers abandoning their fields and losing interest in agricultural production. By the late 1970s, Vietnamese agriculture had seriously declined: crop and livestock productivity and yields fell, and production was insufficient to meet demand. Farmers' incomes and living standards declined. Faced with an agricultural sector unable to meet the country's dietary needs, the Communist Party of Vietnam issued Directive 100-CT/TW in 1981 based on existing contract models in Hải Phòng, Vĩnh Phúc, and Nghệ Tĩnh, expanding the contract farming system within agricultural cooperatives, creating momentum for development and bringing about clear results. In 1985, food production reached 18.2 million tons.

=== Industry ===
The Fourth National Congress of the Communist Party of Vietnam in December 1976 determined to "promote socialist industrialization, build socialist technical infrastructure, transform our country from small-scale productions to a large-scale socialist industry, and within reason prioritize the development of heavy industries based on the development of agriculture and light industries, combining industry and agriculture nationwide into an industrial-agricultural structure; combining the development of productive forces with the establishment and improvement of new production relations, combining the economy with national defense."

In the 10 years from 1975 to 1986, the State invested 65 billion dong (at 1982 prices) into industries, of which over 70% was invested in heavy industries and nearly 30% in light industries. Industrial investment accounted for over 40% of total investments in the production sector, with a higher investment growth rate than the average for the entire production sector. During this period, many relatively large projects were constructed. By 1985, the entire industrial sector comprised 3,220 state-owned enterprises, 36,630 small-scale industrial establishments with 2.653 million workers, producing 105 billion dong in total output value, generating 30% of the national income, 40% of the total social product, and over 50% of the output from industries and agriculture.

==== After reunification ====
In 1976, Vietnam's entire industrial sector had approximately 520,000 officials and workers. Of these, the North had 1,279 factories, the South had 634 factories, the central government managed 540 factories, and local governments managed 1,373 factories. The North had 3,000 small industrial establishments with over 600,000 workers. The South had hundreds of thousands of private establishments with 800,000-900,000 workers. The total industrial output in 1976 reached a value equivalent to 48 billion dong (at 1982 fixed prices). Of this total, heavy industries accounted for 34.1% and light industries accounted for 65.9%; state-owned enterprises accounted for 62.7%, small-scale industries 37.3%, central industries 44.2%, and local industries 55.8%. Heavy industries accounted for a small proportion: energy: 5.6%, metallurgy: 3.3%, machinery: 12.3%, chemical fertilizers: 9.4%, construction materials: 6%. Light industries, including food and beverages, accounted for 33.6%, and textiles, leather, and dyeing accounted for 14.5%. In the national economic structure, industry accounted for 10.6% of the labor force, 37% of the total fixed asset value, produced 38.4% of the social product, 25.3% of the GDP, and 53% of the output of industry and agriculture.

Vietnamese industry depended on imported raw materials, with sectors such as machinery, chemicals, and textiles being completely dependent. Equipment was imported from many sources, including 41% from 13 capitalist countries, 20% from the Soviet Union and Eastern Europe, and only about 13% was manufactured domestically. Production efficiency was low and not fully utilized (state-owned industries only reached 62% of total capacity) with an accumulation rate of 0.25 dong per dong of fixed assets in central industries. The accumulation ratio of 100 dong of production capital was only 33%, not yet having reached the stable level of the 1964–1965 period in the North and 1970 in the South. On May 12, 1975, Vietnam and the Soviet Union signed an agreement regarding the Soviet Union's emergency non-repayable aid to Vietnam, including fuel, fertilizers, food, transport vehicles, and many other consumer goods.

In the North, industrial output in 1975 was 16.2 times that of 1955, with state-owned enterprises growing 44.8 times and small-scale industries growing 5.6 times; heavy industry growing 27.1 times and light industry growing 12.3 times; central industries growing 76 times and local industries growing 9.2 times. However, the North's heavy industries were still underdeveloped and unable to serve the national economy. Industry was not linked to agriculture; production was unstable, there was a lack of domestic raw materials, and the industry had not yet accumulated enough experience nor developed its own market. Especially in heavy industries; management was poor and productivity was low. In the South, industry accounted for only 8-10% of total production, and most were small and medium-sized enterprises: 175,000 enterprises with 1.4 million workers and $800 million USD in fixed assets, about 1% of enterprises had 10 or more workers. Light industries accounted for 90% of industrial output value. Southern industry was completely dependent on foreign countries for equipment replacements and raw materials, with approximately 70-100% of raw materials being imported. After 1970, Southern industry had to import 300 million USD worth of raw materials and 65 million USD worth of equipment annually.

==== 1976–1980 period ====
During this period, Vietnam implemented its second five-year plan (1976–1980) to build socialism and industrialize the country, building a technical material foundation for the economy, forming a new industrial-agricultural economic structure; restore and develop industrial production to meet the people's demand for equipment and consumer goods; carry out socialist renovation in the south, and unify the management and organization of industries throughout the country. The plan set the following targets to be achieved by 1980: 1 million tons of marine fish, 10 million tons of clean coal, 5 billion kWh of electricity, 2 million tons of cement, 1.3 million tons of chemical fertilizers, 250-300 thousand tons of steel, 3.5 million m3 of wood, 450 million meters of fabric, 130,000 tons of paper, and a 2.5-fold increase in mechanical production compared to 1975.

On September 4, 1975, the Vietnamese government launched the First Campaign to Reform the Capitalist Class in southern Vietnam. On July 15, 1976, the Politburo issued Resolution 254/NQ/TW on immediate tasks in the South, completing the elimination of the capitalist class and implementing a reform of private industry and commerce. In December 1976, the state launched the Second Capitalist Reform Campaign. Subsequently, the Politburo meeting in March 1977 decided to finish reforming capitalist private enterprises in the South within 1977–1978. In 1976, the merchant bourgeoisie and large industrial bourgeoisie in the South were eliminated. In 1978, the state reformed small and medium industrial bourgeoisie classes in the South, including eliminating economic control for Chinese ethnic minorities. By May 1979, all public enterprises in the South had been converted into state-owned enterprises. As a result of the Southern Capitalist Reform Campaigns, 1,354 enterprises with 130,000 workers were nationalized, accounting for 34% of enterprises and 55% of workers; 498 public-private joint ventures with 13,000 workers were established, accounting for 14.5% of establishments and 5.5% of workers; 1,600 cooperatives were established, processing plants, and contract manufacturers with over 70,000 workers, accounting for 45% of enterprises and about 30% of workers. The remaining privately-owned industrial establishments accounted for about 6% of establishments and 5% of workers, out of the total number of privately-owned industrial enterprises. Over 500 cooperatives and 5,000 cooperative groups with over 250,000 workers were created. Ho Chi Minh City alone had 144 cooperatives with 27,634 workers and 1,964 cooperative groups with 75,284 workers, accounting for 71% of the city's total handicraft workers. Other provinces reorganized approximately 40% of their handicraft workers. By the end of 1985, the number of small handicraft establishments in the South included 2,937 professional cooperatives, 10,124 professional production groups, 3,162 agricultural and small handicraft cooperatives, 529 mixed cooperatives, and 920 private households. The Vietnamese government assessed that they had only abolished the old industrial production structure and had not yet established new production methods.

Thanks to the state's investment efforts in the industrial sector, its total assets increased by 13 billion dong during the 1976–1980 period, accounting for 35% of the increase in fixed assets in the production sector. However, capital utilization efficiency was low. Industrial production developed steadily in the first three years but then declined, with some years seeing an absolute decrease. Among them, centralized industries declined the most, decreasing by 4% annually due to a lack of raw materials. Meanwhile, local industries, especially small-scale handicrafts, continued to develop, increasing by 6.7% annually, thanks to a flexible mechanism and the exploitation of local raw material. For the entire period, the average growth rate was only 0.6% per year, meaning that none of the targets set by the 4th National Party Congress were achieved. Industrial targets of the second five-year plan (1976–1980) yielded the following results: mechanical output value reached 80%; electricity production was 3,680 million kWh, reaching 73.6%; coal reached 52%; roundwood extraction was 1.577 million m^{3}, reaching 45%; fabric was 182 million meters, reaching 40.4%; sea fishing was 399 thousand tons, reaching 39.9%; paper and cardboard reached 48.3 thousand tons, achieving 37%; cement reached 641 thousand tons, achieving 32%; chemical fertilizers reached 367 thousand tons, achieving 28%; steel production reached 62.5 thousand tons, achieving 25%.

Despite efforts to develop the economy through industrialization, Vietnam's economy grew slowly. By the end of the second five-year plan period from 1979 to 1980, industrial production stagnated and declined due to small-scale production and low productivity. The economy was unable to accumulate capital, while foreign aid gradually declined, and there were difficulties in supplying raw materials, as well as in transforming the bureaucratic subsidy administration, on top of the wars in the Southwest and North and external embargoes. Furthermore, the failure to develop industries during this period was also due to a centralized system, which failed to combine planning with the market, failed to exploit and utilize the existing capitalist economy in the South, and was slow to overcome stagnation and conservatism in the formulation of specific policies.

==== 1981–1985 period ====
During this period, Vietnam implemented its third five-year plan (1981–1985). The state adjusted the relationship between industry and agriculture, between heavy industries and light industries. More attention was paid to appropriate methods when introducing socialist reforms in industries, and improvements were made towards expanding the autonomy of enterprises and cooperatives. However, the state maintained a centralized, bureaucratic, and subsidized planning management. Therefore, despite some adjustments in policy direction and management direction, Vietnam's economic model and industrialization remained fundamentally unchanged.

During this period, industrial production overcame recession and crisis, beginning to develop thanks to management improvements in line with Decision 25/CP and Decision 146/HĐBT, and due to a number of large-scale construction projects in the 1976–1980 period that went into production, supplying products to the economy. By 1985, the entire industrial sector had produced 105 billion dong, an increase of over 61.3% compared to 1976 and 57.4% compared to 1980. From 1981 to 1985, the average annual growth rate reached 9.5%, with heavy industry growing by 6.4% and light industry by 11.2%, centralized industry by 7.8% and local industry by 10.4%, and small-scale industry by 11.4%. The industrial structure changed as follows: heavy industry/light industry in 1980 was 37.8%/62.2% and in 1985 was 31.4%/68.6%; state-owned/privately-owned industry in 1980 was 60.2%/39.8% and in 1985 was 56.3%/43.7%. In 1985, several key product indicators were reached per capita: electricity generation at 87.2 kWh, compared to 62.7 kWh (1976); clean coal at 93.9 kg, compared to 115 kg (1976); cement reached 25.1 kg, compared to 15.1 kg (1976); bricks reached 49 pieces, compared to 75 pieces (1976); round timber reached 0.024 m^{3}, compared to 0.031 m^{3} (1976); paper reached 1.31 kg, compared to 1.53 kg (1976); table salt reached 11.2 kg, compared to 11.9 kg (1976); marine fish reached 10.5 kg, compared to 12.3 kg (1976); fabric reached 6.2 meters, compared to 4.5 meters (1976). The production of many commodities decreased compared to 1976, and only some saw a slight increase. However, the population grew rapidly, leading to a decline in the quality of life for the people.

=== Commerce ===
==== After reunification ====
In the South, private commerce was quite developed. The Vietnamese government advocated reforming commerce in the South to eliminate the bourgeoisie, end Chinese control of wholesale and retail trade, combat speculation and illegal business practices that destabilized economic and social life, and build socialism. The state also focused on building a state-owned commerce system by mobilizing tens of thousands of commerce officials to the South to establish provincial and district management agencies while building a commercial network in southern localities. In May 1975, the General Department of Internal Trade was established, and on May 26, 1975, the Commerce Department of the newly liberated city of Saigon was established. Subsequently, Commerce Departments of other provinces and cities were also established. By the end of 1976, two general companies and ten wholesale commerce companies had been established throughout the South, along with nearly 60 provincial commerce companies with over 500 stores.

After Vietnam's reunification, three different currencies circulated in the South: the currency of the Republic of Vietnam's regime, the currency of the Provisional Revolutionary Government, and the currency of the State Bank of Vietnam. Initially, the state temporarily restricted trade between the two regions. By 1976, these trade restrictions were gradually lifted.

==== 1976–1980 period ====
During this period, distribution and circulation faced many difficulties. State-owned commerce developed rapidly but remained weak, with an insufficient number of goods. The procurement and distribution of goods encountered many difficulties. Newly established commercial cooperatives were not yet strong enough to support state-owned commerce in procurement, sourcing goods, retail distribution, and market control. Private commerce was not well managed, and the administration of the free market was still weak.

In early 1978, the government implemented a second currency reform to unify the currency throughout Vietnam, unify the markets of the two regions, and unify the economic leadership throughout the country, with state-owned commerce playing a leading role. The flow of goods between the two regions increased, and foreign trade increased thanks to the state's promotion of exports and imports. From the end of 1978 onwards, due to Vietnam sending troops into Cambodia, the United States and a number of other countries implemented embargoes and discriminatory policies, stopping aid and investment in Vietnam and suspending committed credits. Meanwhile, war broke out on the southwestern and northern borders, causing difficulties and imbalances in the economy. The market fluctuated, and commodity prices rose rapidly. Trade management remained heavily bureaucratic and centralized, proving to be ineffective.

In 1977–1978, due to natural disasters, the procurement of agricultural products did not meet requirements. Industries lacked raw materials, supplies, and fuel. The second five-year plan (1976–1980) failed to meet targets, and the state's commodity reserves did not meet demand. Many essential items could only be supplied at about 50% of the standard quantity distributed by ration coupons. In the South, the number of people engaged in wholesale commerce and services increased rapidly. Private traders dominated many types of consumer goods. State-owned commerce did not control the market for agricultural products and food. For retail consumer goods, state-owned commerce became a warehouse for rationed distribution, and the budget had to cover heavy losses. Industrial goods prices were not adjusted according to supply and demand, especially for essential consumer goods and imported goods for production.

Import and export activities were conducted under a centralized planning system, with the state holding a monopoly on foreign trade. The main trading partners were socialist countries operating under a protocol system. There were only about 30 state-owned units and companies engaged in import and export activities nationwide, with a very low total import and export turnover (average per capita exports were only below 10 rubles per person, of which 70% of export turnover belonged to the ruble zone). Import and export activities were sluggish, and the trade balance suffered from a severe and prolonged deficit. The foreign trade deficit compensation mechanism has caused the state budget's export losses to increase. Domestic prices for imported goods are lower than cost prices, forcing the state to restrict imports of equipment, raw materials, and essential consumer goods needed for economic and social development and improving people's livelihoods. At this time, most goods supplied to the domestic market must be imported. The balance of money and goods and the supply and demand for a number of essential items were seriously out of balance. Import and export activities were also negatively affected by the foreign exchange rate mechanism, which was implemented at an internal settlement price with the value of the Vietnamese dong many times higher than its real value; rigidity in the pricing of materials, raw materials, and imported and exported goods; import-export corporations are assigned by industry without linking imports to exports; and the annual budget has to spend a large amount of money to cover losses from import and export activities.

==== 1981–1985 period ====
The 6th Central Conference held in August 1979 allowed enterprises to sell a part of their products exceeding the target to the State or on the free market. The State adjusted food taxes and prices to encourage production, and revised the distribution system in agricultural cooperatives, abandoning fixed-quota distribution to encourage workers' initiative. In the early 1980s, some localities piloted a model based on the mechanism of “buying high, selling high” instead of “buying supply, selling at a subsidy”; compensating for the price difference in wages. However, there was still a tendency to revert to old ideas and practices. The 5th Central Conference held in December 1983 still considered the slow pace of socialist renovation to be one of the causes of economic and social difficulties, and advocated further acceleration of socialist reform. The state must control goods and money, abolish the free market for food and important agricultural and marine products, unify price management, ensure sufficient supply of essential items in accordance with the prescribed quantities for wage earners, and establish supply stores.

The 8th Central Conference held in June 1985 decided to decisively abolish the centralized bureaucratic and subsidy economy and implement a single price mechanism, abolish the system of supplying goods at low prices, and transfer all production and business activities to an economic accounting system. In September 1985, a general adjustment of prices, wages, and money was carried out, causing “market prices to undergo many complex changes, adversely affecting many economic and social activities.” Inflation rose at a breakneck pace to triple digits for many years, peaking at 774.7% in 1986. The gap between prices and wages, and between nominal and real wages, was so large that in early 1986, another step backward had to be taken: implementing a dual-price policy. Money circulation at the end of 1984 was 8.4 times that at the end of 1980.

== Culture and society ==
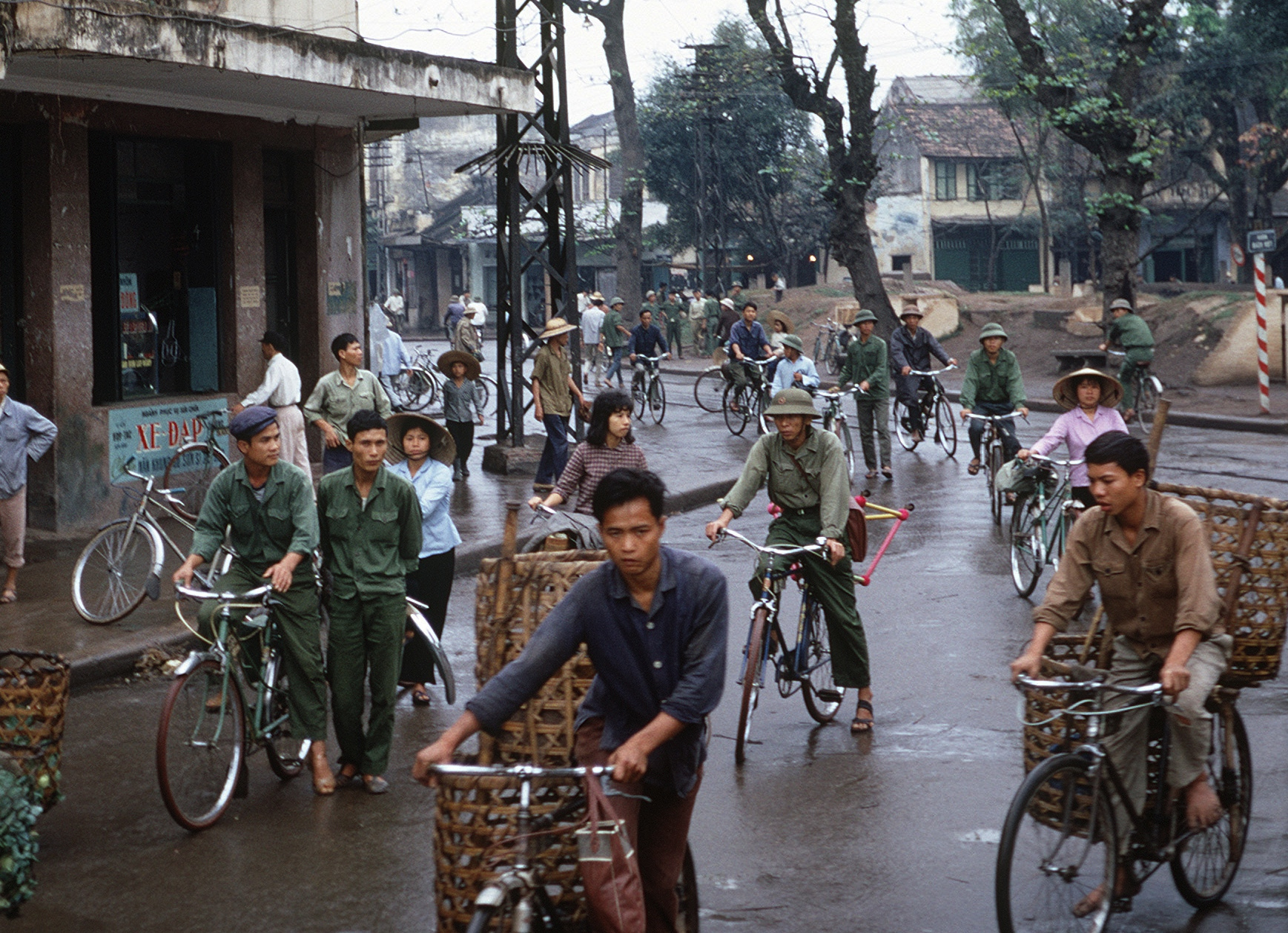
The streets of Hanoi in 1973, with bicycles being the main method of transportation

=== Culture ===
The Vietnamese population had little exposure to Western culture, literature, films, and music, which were all tightly controlled by the government. The literature that being circulated was mainly classical, Russian, socialist, leftist, critical realism, socialist realism, and positive romanticism; schools of thought that were considered "negative" or "cheap" were not allowed to be publicized. Literature was mainly used to promote socialism-communism, patriotism, collectivism, love of labor, and internationalism.

Permitted genres of music included Western classical music such as symphonies and operas, folk songs and red music. Pre-war music, yellow music, pop, ca trù, chầu văn, nhã nhạc, and music from "capitalist" countries were banned. At the end of the subsidy period, the ban on light music was lifted.

Movies were only available on film, not on television, and were mainly shown in theaters, at traveling shows, and on television at certain times. At the end of the subsidy era, commercial films were accepted to a certain extent. Foreign films shown were mainly from the Soviet Union and other socialist countries (Chinese films were banned after the 1979 Sino-Vietnamese War), as well as films from France, the United States, the United Kingdom, and India. Vietnamese films mainly promoted combat and industrial production, with some pre-1945 works of critical realism being adapted.

The state focused on combating superstition and promoting science. Newspapers did not carry commercial advertisements. The newspapers were very similar in their views and ideas, differing only in that they served different audiences. The press did not pursue profits and were subsidized. Artists and writers worked in state agencies and organizations and were paid salaries by the state like civil servants.

=== Society ===
Beyond the economic consequences, the subsidy economy period in Vietnam was also a time of social and political isolation and suspicion. Although there were no formal laws, the state was quite cautious toward Westerners and foreigners due to ideological differences and security concerns. Vietnamese people were largely prevented from interacting with foreigners. Anyone who violated this rule would be interrogated by the police. Tourism was not a priority, and immigration controls were very strict.

The gap between rich and poor was very small. Education and healthcare were subsidized, although equipment at the time was quite poor. University graduates all had jobs assigned by the state; they could not choose their careers, although they did not experience unemployment. University entrance exams were very difficult, requiring high standards. There was a strong sense of community in society. There were not many forms of entertainment, but the population was less stressed by work and material needs compared to the following Đổi Mới period.

=== Education ===
Educational achievements during this period included the development of a universal primary education system down to the commune level; every commune and ward had a primary school or a combined primary and lower secondary school. The government put a focus on cultural enrichment and literacy programs for school-age children, and every district, county, and town had a cultural enrichment school for grassroots officials. However, accompanying this strong quantitative growth was a decline in the quality of the education system due to a shortage of schools and classrooms, a lack of well-trained teachers, low teacher salaries, lax examination procedures, and a focus on achieving results.

When the North and South unified in 1976, the educational model in the North had to become aligned with the education system established in the South; specifically, the 10-year primary and secondary school curriculum in the North had to be compatible with the 12-year curriculum in the South. The two systems coexisted; the North continued with the 10-year system and the South retained the 12-year system from 1976 to 1981.

By 1981, an 11-year system was implemented in the North, adding a 5th grade. In 1992–1993, the North's 11-year general education system was changed from 11 years to 12 years, adding a 9th grade. Since then, the entire system has been a unified 12-year system nationwide. The education reform began in 1981, shifting from 10 years to 12 years, leading to the renewal of curriculums and textbooks and improvements to the writing system. Due to strong public reaction, the education sector gradually reverted to the old writing system. Due to the directive that Vietnam's education system must catch up with the Soviet Union and Eastern European countries, the teaching program of the 1981 education reform was deemed too demanding by the schools themselves. Having adopted the idea that the method of teaching would follow the material, if textbooks were overloaded with content, there was no method other than one-way transmission of information from teachers to students to keep up with the curriculum. Foreign languages were primarily Russian, while English was temporarily discontinued and then reintroduced in 1985.

=== Health ===
During the subsidy period, people would go to the hospital for treatment or to buy medicine, then bring receipts back to their workplace or the hospital for reimbursement without having to pay out of pocket. However, treatment conditions were extremely inadequate. Although it was a period of state subsidies, the government lacked funds and production was underdeveloped, and hospitals faced countless difficulties. Medicine and medical equipment were mainly provided through foreign aid. The Ministry of Health had a Planning Department and a Materials Bureau responsible for allocating quotas to hospitals. For example: Bach Mai Hospital was allocated a certain number of mattresses, blankets, sugar, milk, fuel, and medicine per year. Hospitals during the subsidy period were small in scale, mainly one to three stories tall. Medicine and medical equipment were insufficient to meet demand, with some being imported and some donated by communist countries.

== Stagnation and Đổi Mới ==
=== Stagnation ===
Before 1975, the Economy of the Republic of Vietnam received approximately one billion USD in aid from the United States each year. The North also received approximately 200 million USD in aid from socialist countries. Shortly after reunification, the United States imposed an embargo, particularly in the South, where factories that had been using American and Western production equipment and machinery were unable to continue operating due to a lack of spare parts. The scale of aid from socialist countries also declined rapidly. Although the Soviet Union and Eastern Europe continued to provide assistance for a few more years, due to the depreciation of their currencies, the amount of goods and raw materials actually reaching Vietnam was only half of what it had been previously. All of this had a significant impact on the country's economy. The scale of exports from the North (coal, tin, handicrafts, among others) at this time was only about 200 million rubles per year. At that time, trade was mainly with countries in the Council for Mutual Economic Assistance, which was monopolized by the state. Due to the US economic embargo, trade relations with the outside world were limited.

The government prioritized the development of heavy industry to build a technical foundation for the economy, while light industry and agriculture were not adequately being invested in, resulting in a significant waste of scarce capital resources. However, heavy industry did not develop as desired in order to become a lever for the economy. Some heavy industrial products had no market, factories were not operating at full capacity, and light industry and agriculture were unable to meet the consumption needs of the people. The policy of focusing on equalization and building localities into autonomous economic units, along with the prohibition of free markets, led to goods being unable to circulate, while the state-owned commercial system was unable to meet the economy's demand for goods distribution. Transforming localities into autonomous economic units also prevented the state from linking localities together, coordinating their strengths into the national plan, and concentrating resources for the goals of industrialization and modernization. The government focused on ensuring employment, which exceeded its economic capacity, so a policy of exporting labor to Eastern Europe had to be established. Labor productivity across the entire economy and capital utilization was very low. Many per capita indicators in 1985 were still lower than in 1976. The annual national income grew by 3.7% while the population grew by 2.3%, meaning that the per capita income only increased by 1.4% per year. The economy was insufficient to meet domestic demand, with annual income covering only 80-90% of needs, the remainder having to rely on foreign aid and loans.

Vietnam lacked the ability to save due to extremely low incomes, resulting in insufficient capital for production development. Development investment, budget revenue and expenditure relied entirely on borrowed capital and foreign aid. During the period of 1976–1980, foreign loans and aid accounted for 38.2% of total budget revenue and 61.9% of total domestic revenue, and 37.3% of total budget expenditure. The budget deficit in was 18.1% in 1980 and 36.6% in 1985, which had to be covered by issuing banknotes, leading to hyperinflation in 1986 with a price increase of 774.7%. Industry stagnated due to a lack of raw materials caused by blockades and embargoes, a lack of foreign currency to import raw materials, a lack of electricity to operate equipment, outdated machinery, and a lack of spare parts to replace broken ones. Most consumer goods had to be imported in whole or in part because domestic production could not meet consumption needs. Between 1976 and 1985, 60 million meters of fabric and 1.5 million tons of food were imported. Investment efficiency in industries during this period was low, resulting in slow and unstable production growth. Agriculture was unable to meet domestic demand. The state apparatus was cumbersome and inefficient, and bureaucratic red tape was widespread.

In the mid-1980s, the socio-economic situation remained extremely difficult. The economic stagnation that emerged in the late 1970s was caused by excessive restructuring from capitalism in the South, prolonged wars on the southwestern and northern borders lasting nearly 10 years, and intensified when Vietnam began shifting to a market economy through its price–wage–currency reform policy, which included currency conversion and wage increases through money printing in 1985. Many people who had saved money found themselves in crisis due to hyperinflation following the currency reform. Some people had sold a cow to deposit money in their savings, but after the currency reform, they could only buy back a few chickens. The ban on the free market exacerbated the scarcity of food and consumer goods. There was a story of an elderly mother who took 5–10 kg of rice to visit her child in another province, but when she reached the provincial border, the rice was confiscated, and she could only cry and beg to no avail. At rural markets, when market management teams wearing red armbands came to confiscate pork sold by private individuals who had slaughtered pigs illegally, the local residents defended the pork sellers and did not support the state market management teams. The food and consumer goods markets were blocked, while the state only distributed low-priced meat coupons to officials and employees (the actual quantity was very small, about 0.3-0.5 kg per person per month) and city dwellers (0.1 kg per person per month). This led to a prolonged shortage of consumer goods and a sharp increase in prices on the black market. The decline in the people's quality of life led to growing discontent and a decline in the prestige of the Communist Party of Vietnam. Nearly one million people, mainly ethnic Chinese, fled the country due to the impact of the border war and in search of better economic opportunities.

Professor Tran Van Tho wrote about the economic situation in the first ten years after the war:

The ten years after 1975 were one of the darkest periods in Vietnam's economic history. In purely economic terms, as an agricultural country (in 1980, 80% of the population lived in rural areas and 70% of the workforce were farmers), Vietnam suffered from food shortages, with many people having to eat cassava for long periods of time. Per capita food production declined continuously from 1976 to 1979, then increased again but did not recover to 1976 levels until 1981. Industry and commerce also stagnated, production ground to a halt, daily necessities were in short supply, and people's lives were extremely difficult. In addition to the difficulties of a post-war country and an unfavorable international situation, the main cause of the above situation was mistakes in policy and development strategy, most notably the hastiness in applying the socialist model to the economy in the South... The risk of prolonged food shortages and other extreme difficulties gave rise to the phenomenon of "breaking the rules" in agriculture, trade, and food pricing, which improved the situation in some localities. However, it was not until the reforms (December 1986) that real change took place. Due to this situation, Vietnam's gross domestic product (GDP) in the 10 years prior to the reforms increased by only 35%, while the population grew by 22%. Thus, the average GDP per capita increased by only about 1% (per year).

In countries that had successfully implemented a planned economic model, such as the Soviet Union, the subsidy method had a definite effect during periods of economic growth that were primarily based on labor and capital. It allowed for the maximum concentration of economic resources on key objectives at each specific stage, particularly during the industrialization process, which prioritized the development of heavy industries. Especially in wartime, it allowed the country to concentrate all resources on the military and national defense. However, in peacetime, it eliminated the need for competition, stifled scientific and technological progress, failed to create economic incentives for workers, and did not stimulate the dynamism and creativity of production and business units. Therefore, during its period of strongest economic growth under Stalin's leadership, the Soviet Union had to implement strict labor discipline (including imprisonment or sending workers who voluntarily quit their jobs to labor camps) along with motivational and reward measures to combat the stagnation and irresponsibility of management officials while promoting labor productivity. When the global economy shifted to a phase of in depth development based on the application of modern scientific and technological revolution, this management mechanism increasingly revealed its shortcomings, causing the economies of socialist countries, including Vietnam, to stagnate.

=== Đổi mới ===
From 1986, Vietnam implemented comprehensive reforms across the country. Under the pressure of existing circumstances, and in order to escape the economic and social crisis, Vietnam took steps to reform its economy towards a market-oriented direction. These included product contracting in agriculture under Directive No. 100-CT/TW of the Central Committee of the Communist Party of Vietnam in 1985, price compensation in wages in Long An, Resolution No. 8 of the 5th Central Committee in 1985 on prices, wages, and money, and the implementation of Decree No. 25-CP and Decree No. 26-CP. These were the practical bases for the Communist Party of Vietnam to decide on a fundamental change in economic management.

The 6th Congress affirmed that "The restructuring of the economy must go hand in hand with the reform of the economic management mechanism. The centralized, bureaucratic, and subsidized management that had been in place for many years failed to create momentum for development, weakened the socialist economy, limited the use and improvement of other economic components, hampered production, reduced productivity, quality, and efficiency, caused chaos in distribution and circulation, and gave rise to many negative phenomena in society."
