= Vietnamese animation =

Vietnamese animation, known in Vietnamese as Hoạt hình Việt Nam (lit. Vietnamese Cartoon), or Hoạt họa Việt Nam (lit. Vietnamese Animation), is a term to describe animation films (hand-drawn and computer-generated) which originates from Vietnam.

== History ==
=== Background ===
In the past, if a feature film of average length was produced, projected on a wide screen for about an hour and a half (meaning the film had to be 2,100 to 2,500 meters long), it would take at least 8 to 12 months. Meanwhile, producing an animation with a length of about one to two rolls (i.e 280 to 500m), would also take 8 to 12 months. If it was supported by advanced equipment and commercially oriented management methods, the amount of times it take can be shortened to 1 to 3 months. Thus, in addition to the different characteristics of the production process of the two film genres, and the different requirements for capital and support equipment, it shows that animated films in Vietnam was difficult to produce.

Vietnamese animation began in 1959 when Vietnam Animation Studio was formed by a group of young animators (Ngô Mạnh Lân, Lê Minh Hiền, Hồ Quảng, Trương Qua...). They were educated in the Soviet Union.

=== 1959–1975 ===
The first Vietnamese animation was Đáng đời thằng Cáo (The Welldeserved Fox) based on a poem called Con cáo và tổ ong (The fox and the beehive) produced in 1959, with a length of 300 meters, it was the first film of the Vietnamese animation industry. It was based on a poem consisting of 14 lines, about a fox trying to dig out a beehive to eat honey, but the bees gathered to sting the fox, which scared away the fox. The poem was written at a time when anti-Japanese and anti-West imperialist sentiments were high.

Tổ ong lủng lẳng trên cành
Trong đầy mật nhộng ngon lành lắm thay.
Cáo già nhè nhẹ lên cây
Định rằng lấy được, ăn ngay cho giòn.
Ong thấy Cáo muốn cướp con,
Kéo nhau xúm lại vây tròn Cáo ta.
Châm đầu, châm mắt Cáo già
Cáo già đau quá phải sa xuống rồi.
Ong kia yêu giống yêu nòi
Đồng tâm hiệp lực đuổi loài cáo đi.
Bây giờ ta thử so bì,
Ong còn đoàn kết, huống chi là người !
Nhật, Tây áp bức giống nòi,
Ta nên đoàn kết để đòi tự do.
English Translation:
A beehive dangling from a branch
Filled with delicious nectar.
The old fox gently climbs the tree
Determined to get it, eat it right away until it's crispy.
The bee saw that the fox wanted to rob him,
Pulling together to surround the fox.
Stinging the head, stinging the eyes of the old fox
The old fox was in so much pain that he had to fall down.
The other bee loves the species
Teaming up to chase away the foxes.
Now let's compare,
Bees are still united, let alone people!
Japan and West oppress the race,
We should unite to demand freedom.

The development process of the Vietnamese animation industry was associated with two entities: Hanoi (birthplace) and the Vietnam Animation Studio (almost the only animation production unit for decades). Meanwhile, in the south of the 17th parallel - the territory controlled by the Republic of Vietnam, there is no evidence that there was ever a ‘true animation industry’ other than a few private studios, specializes in special effects for movies or music tapes.

From 1959 to 1975, the Vietnam Animation Studio made the following films:

- Đáng đời thằng Cáo (The Welldeserved Fox) (1959)
- Con một nhà (1961)
- Chú Thỏ đi học (1962)
- Bi Bô và Hòa
- Một ước mơ (1963)
- Giời sắp mưa (1964)
- Em bé nông dân và con hổ
- Em bé hái củi và chú hươu con
- Mèo Con (1965)
- Con sáo biết nói (1967)
- Những chiếc áo ấm (1968)
- Chuyện ông Gióng (1970)
- Chú đất nung
- Rồng lửa Thăng Long (1973)
- Lật Đật và Phồng Phềnh (1973)
- Bàn tay khổng lồ (1975)

=== 1976–1985 ===
After the war ended, the Vietnamese animation industry had a favorable opportunity to develop further thanks to inheriting filmmaking equipment from the Republic of Vietnam and abundant support from the Soviet Union. Vietnamese animation during this period had strongly exploited folk tales, while also bringing into the film the innocence and humor of children's spiritual life.

Notably, artists began to incorporate traditional folk drawings into cartoons, many of which were even drawn on “dó paper”. Due to the typical concept of the time that animation is a field only for young children, most films must ensure freshness in form, integrating educational elements into the content, and the plot must be easy to understand. These things will eventually bring Vietnamese animation to a standstill, but nonetheless, the pre-Doi Moi period is worth considering as a time of flourishing for the Vietnamese animation industry.

- Thạch Sanh (1976)
- Ông Trạng thả diều (1981)
- Bước ngoặt (1982)
- Ai cũng phải sợ (1983)

=== 1986–2000 ===
During the Doi Moi period, because the full subsidy policy was removed, film production units had to find audiences themselves. The Vietnamese animation industry is inherently too small compared to other fields, with almost only one production unit, the Vietnam Animation Studio. Although there was another unit, the animation studio of the Ho Chi Minh City General Film Enterprise, this facility only made 20 films until it dissolved, and did not make any impression. Cartoons of this period increased in length and the filmmaking materials were also extremely rich; however, the drawings and movements are ‘clumsy’ and the content is heavily didactic - so it cannot integrate into the global animation trend.

Films are produced only for competitive purposes and local screening, so almost no one knows about the Vietnamese animation industry. This can be seen as a period of crisis, with old philosophies and old methods of filmmaking.

- Người thợ chạm tài hoa (1992)
- Trê Cóc (1993)
- Phép lạ hồi sinh (1994)
- Chim Ri và Tu Hú
- Cất nhà giữa hồ
- Chiếc vỏ hộp ven đường

=== 2001–2010 ===
This period marked the emergence of computer graphics techniques, initially 2D and now 3D. Vietnamese cinematographers are starting to get used to drawing animation on computers, but the images are still rough and the content is not unique. In addition, many filmmaking groups or animation studios have emerged massively, as a way to compensate for the gap that Vietnam Animation Studio has long been unable to fully embrace. And as of 2010, the company has produced more than 370 cartoons.

This period also marked the return of political propaganda films with historical elements. Because updating international animation trends has become very easy, Vietnamese animation has many aspects evolving - from filmmaking techniques to content creation methods. However, because there has never been a foundation of a sustainable handmade animation industry, it was reliant on technology, and the stories are not creative. The biggest weakness of Vietnamese animation is that the dubbing stage has never been overcome, and it was rudimentary and develops slowly compared to just a few neighboring countries.

- Xe đạp (2001)
- Xe đạp và ô tô (2002)
- Chuyện hai chiếc bình (2003)
- Cuộc phiêu lưu của Ong Vàng (2003)
- Tít và Mít (2005)
- Giấc mơ của Ếch Xanh (2005)
- Hiệp sĩ Trán Dô (2006)
- Chú bé đánh giày (2007)
- Ve Vàng và Dế Lửa (2007)
- Câu chuyện mùa đông (2009)
- Lu và Bun (2009)
- Thỏ và Rùa (2009)
- Người con của Rồng (2010)
- Trên ngọn cây (2010)
- Chiếc giếng thời gian (2010)

=== 2011–present ===
Vietnam Animation Studio currently has a production scale of 17 to 18 cartoons a year, most of them are traditionally drawn or by computer and a lot of them were made by students groups and small studios. From 2013 to 2015, it has produced about 3,000 minutes of animation each year. And in January 2014, the company opened a cinema dedicated to showing animated films. With the rising Vietnamese comics industry in 2010s, Vietnamese animation is hoped to rise, with Asian comics & animation and Western comics & animation to be an initial inspiration for Vietnamese animations and comics to initially draw from.

By 2015, there are about 10 animation companies, most of which complete Japanese animation processing business.

Since 2016, animation in Vietnam has seen a significant improvement in 3D animation techniques, thanks to independent animation studios such as Colory Animation or Red Cat Motion. Besides, 2D animation has also had a noticeable change, with the example of DeeDee Animation Studio. Because of the production costs of animation in Vietnam is relatively lower than the global average, Vietnamese animation studios are usually selected as the outsourcing partners for international animation projects. Additionally, using animated videos also becomes a preferred video marketing strategy for several major brands in Vietnam, such as MILO or Lifebuoy.

In late 2018, POPS Worldwide, with the funding from Lifebuoy, publish the animated series "The Silver iOn Squad", produced by DeeDee Animation Studio.

In early 2019, DeeDee Animation Studio also premieres the animated short film "Broken Being: Prequel" on social media channels. The film is positively received by the media and newspapers, such as Dan Tri, Vietnamnet, Tien Phong, etc., who all claim that the film is "the first [21st Century] animated film in Vietnam that targets adults". Meanwhile, according to Dan Tri, "the animated film "Broken Being: Prequel" has changed the animation scene in Vietnam".

In October 2019, Foxshelf and Red Cat Motion launched Vietnam's first animation book called "Xứ Sở Animation" (Land of Animation). This book is a textbook on animation, compiled by Leo Dinh (CEO of Red Cat Motion), in collaboration with many other individuals in the domestic animation industry.

From 2021 onwards, Lạc Trôi (Lost & Drifting) is an animation that has debuted under MTP Entertainment as Son Tung playing the role of a fictional, historical Vietnamese prince who washes ashore into modern society by Episode 9. ACE Media Viet Nam has been providing the voice-acting and AVR Creative Viet Nam the animation, with a number of other individuals on the project as well.

pops.tv is also home to Vietnamese-made comics and animation.

There has been an ongoing Vietnamese animation series called Thỏ Bảy Màu (Rainbow Bunny). It was first conceived in 2014 by Huỳnh Thái Ngọc. It chronicles the adventures of Rainbow Bunny and its three companions, Sister Xo, her boyfriend Quan, and her grandpa Nam.

- Dưới bóng cây (In the Shade of Trees) (2011)
- Hiệp sĩ Rồng (2011)
- Cô bé bán diêm (2011)
- Voi Cà Chua và chim sẻ Su Su (2012)
- Đại chiến Bạch Đằng (2012)
- Khu đầm có cánh (2013)
- Vạn Xuân chiến quốc (2013)
- Con Rồng Cháu Tiên (2017)
- Tàn Thể (2019)
- BÌNH NGÔ ĐẠI CHIẾN (2020)

== Genres ==
- Hand-drawn animation
- Puppet animation
- Clay animation
- Cutout animation
- Computer animation (2D, 3D...)

== Studios ==
- DeeDee Animation Studio
- Planion Animation
- Omni Animation
- Thunder Cloud Studio
- CG Vietnam
- Studio Biho
- Vietnam Animation Studio
- Hochiminh City Animation Studio
- Liberation Film Studio
- HFL Media
- AREKA Studio
- Hongbang University International
- Hanoi Film Productions
- Evertoon Animation Studio
- Sunrise Media
- Animost Animation Studio
- Armada TMT Vietnam
- Biqit Studio
- KimyMedia
- Bamboo Animation
- Colory Animation Studio
- Phamthuynhan Productions
- S18.Animation
- Truong CG Artist
- BIG6 ANIMATION STUDIO
- Rainstorm Film

== Animators ==
- Hà Huy Hoàng
- Phùng Đình Dũng
- Ngô Mạnh Lân
- Lê Minh Hiền
- Hồ Quảng
- Trương Qua
- Cao Thụy
- Mai Long
- Tô Hoài
- Nguyễn Hà Bắc
- Vũ Kim Dũng
- Lê Bình
- Đặng Vũ Thảo
- Phạm Minh Trí
- Giáp Vo
- Nguyễn Thị Phương Hoa
- Phạm Sông Đông
- Nguyễn Thái Hùng
- Trần Thanh Việt
- Phùng Văn Hà
- Huỳnh Vĩnh Sơn
- Nguyễn Cao Hoàng
- Mike Nguyễn
- Bùi Quốc Thắng
- Trần Khánh Duyên
- Doãn Thành
- Đoàn Trần Anh Tuấn
- Châu Võ Bá Trường
- Đoàn Tuấn Anh
- Nguyễn Đắc Hoàng

== See also ==
- Vietnamese comics
- Cinema of Vietnam
- List of Vietnamese films
