= The Babygirl and the Flowerpot =

1970 film

The babygirl and the flowerpot Em bé và lọ hoa
- Directed by: Nghiêm Dung
- Written by: Văn Biển
- Produced by: Lê Thanh
- Cinematography: Thúy Hằng
- Music by: Hồ Bắc
- Production company: Vietnam Animation Studio
- Distributed by: Vietnam Animation Studio
- Release date: 1970
- Running time: 10 minutes
- Country: Vietnam
- Language: Vietnamese

The babygirl and the flowerpot (Vietnamese : Em bé và lọ hoa) is a 1970 Vietnamese animated film, directed by Nghiêm Dung.

== Production ==
- Artist: Hữu Đức
- Animator: Dân Quốc, Đình Dũng, Bảo Quang, Vũ Tân Dân, Kiến Hiền, Sỹ Nhạc, Song An
- Decorating: Khắc Y
- Sound: Cao Huy
- Montager: Nguyễn Thị Tám
- Color printing by the Vietnamese Technology for Film Production Factory

== Award ==
- Merit prize of Moskva International Film Festival, 1973.
