= The Welldeserved Fox =

The Welldeserved Fox Đáng đời thằng Cáo
- Directed by: Lê Minh Hiền; Trương Qua
- Written by: Lê Minh Hiền; Hồ Chí Minh (poem)
- Produced by: Lê Minh Hiền
- Production companies: Vietnam Animation Studio; Vietnam Feature Film Studio
- Distributed by: Vietnam Animation Studio; Vietnam Television
- Release date: 1959
- Running time: 10 minutes
- Country: Vietnam
- Language: Vietnamese

The Welldeserved Fox (Vietnamese: Đáng đời thằng Cáo) is a 1959 Vietnamese animated film, directed by Lê Minh Hiền and Trương Qua. It is based on the poem The fox and the hive (Con cáo và tổ ong) by Hồ Chí Minh.

== Plot ==
Bear and Chicken live in the forest, farming. One day, Chicken is lured away by Fox, who is pretending to be a Rabbit to play with Chicken. Fox tries to eat Chicken, but Chicken escapes to a nearby tree. Bear, who thinks Chicken was eaten by the Fox, mourns the loss of Chicken with the Bees.

Bear inadvertently sets a trap for Fox, which is successful, and the Bees chase and apprehend the Fox. Then, Bear and the Bees discover that Chicken is still alive. They rejoice together while gardening: the Chicken waters the Flower, the Bear tends to the Flower, and the Bees draw pollen from the Flower, all working together in harmony.

A practice of class Vietnamese Animated Film
(Bài thực-tập của lớp hoạt-họa Việt-nam)

— Film's headword

== Production ==
The Welldeserved Fox was known as the first animated film of the North Vietnam.

The film was initially planned to be 10 minutes long, with the 300m length and 15,000 drawings on 18x24cm cellophane cells. In the end, the animators used typewriter paper soaked in oil. Their "desks" were glass windows in Vietnam Animation Studio's house on Hoàng Hoa Thám Street (Hanoi).

- Animators : Lê Minh Hiền, Trương Qua, Hồ Quảng...

== Award ==
- Golden Lotus prize at the Vietnam Film Festival II (1973) for the best artists (Hồ Quảng and Trương Qua).

== See also ==
- History of Vietnamese animation
