= Economic history of Vietnam =

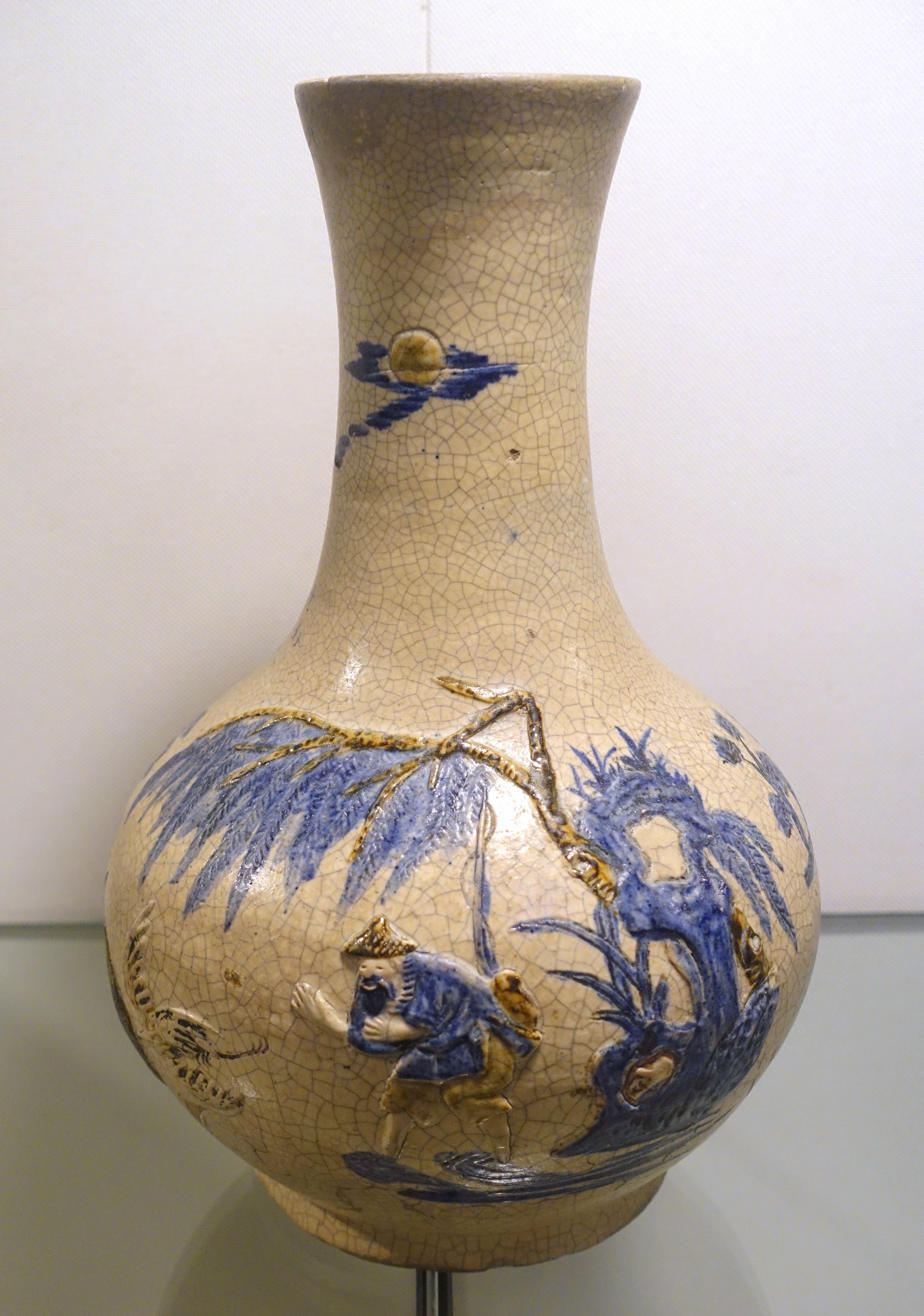
A crackled blue-white glazed Vietnamese vase depicting Fisherman and the Geek, produced by Bát Tràng village, Nguyễn dynasty period, 19th century

GDP per capita of Vietnam between 1820 and 2018

Until French colonization in the middle of the 19th century, the economy of Vietnam was mainly agrarian and village-oriented. However, French colonizers deliberately developed the regions differently, designating the South for agricultural production and the North for manufacturing. Though the plan exaggerated regional divisions, the development of exports--coal from the North, rice from the South—and the importation of French manufactured goods stimulated internal commerce.

When the North and South were divided politically in 1954, they also adopted different economic ideologies: communism in the North and capitalism in the South. Destruction caused by the 1955–1975 Second Indochina War (commonly known as the Vietnam War) seriously strained Vietnam's economy. Across Vietnam, the situation was worsened by the country's 3 million military and civilian deaths and its later exodus of 2.1 million refugees, including tens of thousands of professionals, intellectuals, technicians, and skilled workers.

Between 1976 and 1986, for annual growth rates for industry, agriculture, and national income and aimed to integrate the North and the South, the plan's aims were not achieved: the economy remained dominated by small-scale production, low labor productivity, unemployment, material and technological shortfalls, and insufficient food and consumer goods. The more modest goals of the Third Five-Year Plan (1981–1985) were a compromise between ideological and pragmatic factions; they emphasized the development of agriculture and industry. Efforts were also made to decentralize planning and improve the managerial skills of government officials.

In 1986 Vietnam launched a political and economic renewal campaign (Doi Moi) that introduced reforms intended to facilitate the transition from a centrally planned economy to form of market socialism officially termed "Socialist-oriented market economy." Doi Moi combined economic planning with free-market incentives and encouraged the establishment of private businesses in the production of consumer goods and foreign investment, including foreign-owned enterprises. By the late 1990s, the success of the business and agricultural reforms ushered in under Doi Moi was evident. More than 30,000 private businesses had been created, and the economy was growing at an annual rate of more than 7 percent, and poverty was nearly halved.

In 2001 the Vietnamese Communist Party (VCP) approved a 10-year economic plan that enhanced the role of the private sector while reaffirming the primacy of the state sector in the economy. In 2003 the private sector accounted for more than one-quarter of all industrial output. However, between 2003 and 2005 Vietnam fell dramatically in the World Economic Forum's Global Competitiveness Report rankings, mostly due to negative perceptions of the effectiveness of government institutions. Official corruption is epidemic, and Vietnam lags in property rights, the efficient regulation of markets, and labor and financial market reforms. Although Vietnam's economy, which continues to expand at an annual rate in excess of 7 percent, is one of the fastest-growing in the world, the economy is growing from an extremely low base, reflecting the crippling effect of the Second Indochina War (1954–75) and repressive economic measures introduced in its aftermath, as well as the effects of politically motivated sanctions put in place by the United States.

== Pre-colonial Vietnam ==
=== Vietnam under Chinese rule ===
Until the early 10th century, Vietnam—with many name variants adopted by various feudal kings—was mostly under Chinese domination, for approximately 1053 years.

The first domination occurred from 207 BC to 29 AD. A brief independent period followed with the coronation of female sister kings Trung Trac and Trung Nhi, which ended in 43 AD. The second Chinese domination was the period from 43 to 544 AD. Lý Nam Đế gained control of Vietnam from Chinese hands for about 60 years before the third Chinese domination, 603-907 AD. Historians tell us that a slave society was still prevalent in Vietnam in around 900 AD. Hanoi, the then called Dai La, was described as having been a populous and thriving urban area since the end of the 9th century. Its residents and merchants traded silk, ivory, gold, silver, paddy rice and other agricultural products.

Besides fairly developed horticulture, artisans of urban Dai La were also able to master important skills for goldsmithing, copper casting and molding, and iron casting. Literate people of Dai La started using Chinese characters in their writing, although they were rarely recorded by historians in this period, while merchants had access to established market facilities. Economic life in historical Vietnam had much to do with the following history of warfare, economic policies by various feudalist governments—particularly those set by the most influential kings—and advancements made by many ordinary people while attempting to improve their economic well-being, many of whom would now be called by modern economic researchers entrepreneurs.

=== Economy of Dynastic Vietnam ===
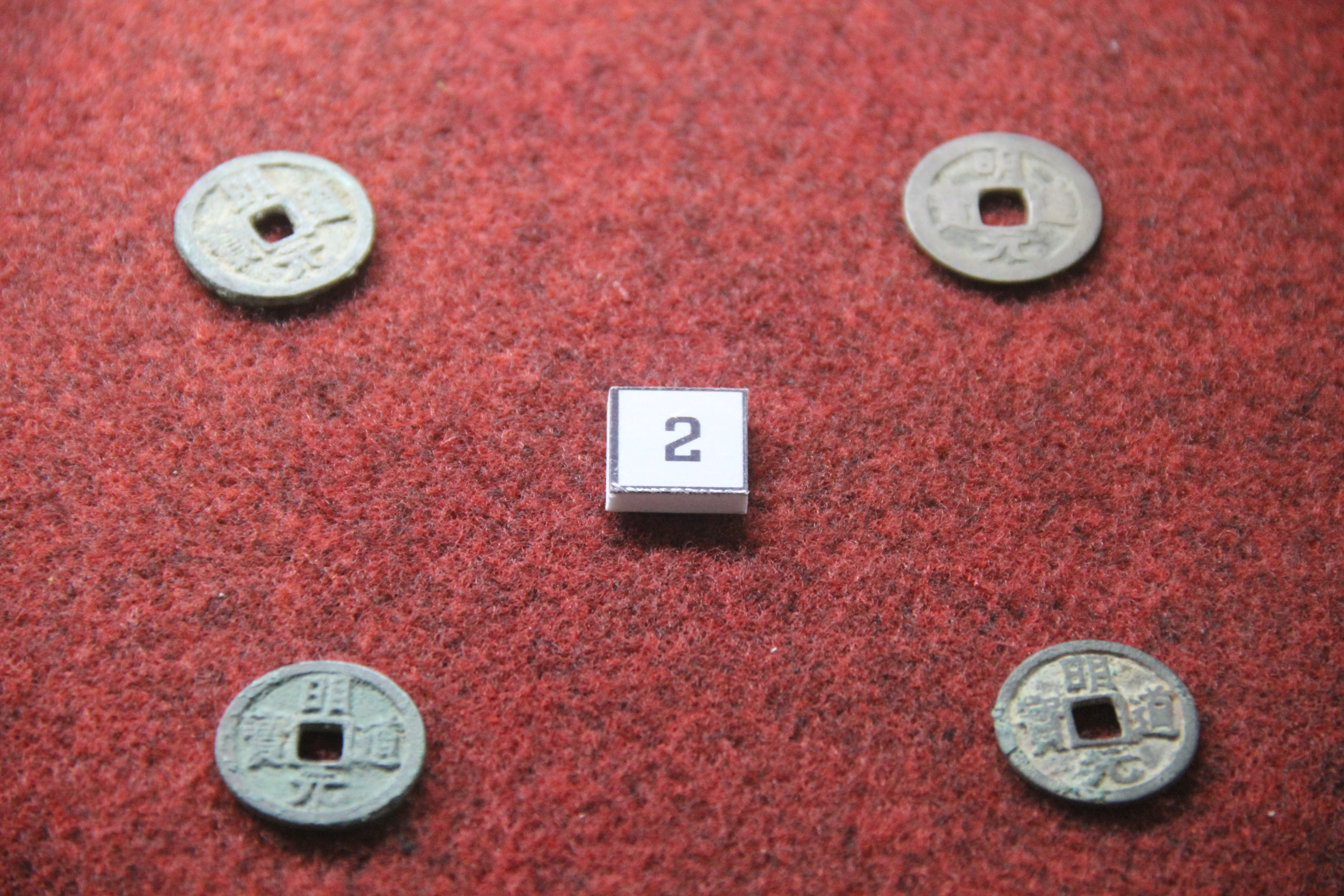
Copper coins issued by Lý Thái Tông (1025-1054), Lý dynasty, 11th century

Over 25 centuries of its history before the mid-19th century, Vietnam's economy had traditionally consisted of agrarian production and small-scaled handicraft industries. It was almost closed with negligible volume of foreign trade, and most of the time displayed a village-oriented autarky.

The economic life of an independent Vietnam should perhaps started with Lê Hoàn (941–1005)–the founding king of the First Lê Dynasty—who was rising to the kingship during the context of the demise of Đinh Tiên Hoàng and the threat of invasion by the Chinese Song Dynasty in 982. Being a king, Lê Hoàn was interested in developing the local economy and improving people's wealth. He had set himself to be an early example of a king participating in rice cultivating in Spring, right after Tết Holiday, an act that many later kings followed, to show that agricultural economy is very important to all Vietnamese. Also, perhaps in his understanding trade was equally important. He ordered to build several canals (Ba Hòa Canal to Thanh Hóa, Da Cái Canal to Nghệ An), with which not only farmers could later have a better irrigation system but merchants could conveniently develop their transport routes as well.

Under the reign of King Lý Công Uẩn (974–1028)—the founding father of Ly Dynasty, together with Tran and Second Lê, one of the most thriving and prosperous periods of the Vietnamese feudalist history—the capital city was relocated from Hoa Lu (Ninh Bình) to Đại La, and at the same time, Đại La was renamed to Thăng Long–meaning "dragon flying up". His concern of a new capital city was two-fold. On the one hand, Thăng Long was in a better position for self-defense purpose with many natural canals, rivers, mountains. The castle had already been well built. On the other hand, economic development would be much easier due to much larger population, skilled labor force, ready-to-use transport systems (by rivers, canals), and much more fertile agricultural lands. The economic reality proved his point positively.

His son, King Lý Thái Tông (1000–1054), added further encouraging policies for economic development such as tax reduction, while trying to remain budget balance and even budget surplus. He enthusiastically encouraged local production by advising people to use local-made handicraft products and even order imperial maids to weave silk and fabrics themselves, so that they would not later have to rely on imports from the Chinese merchants. The fourth king of Lý Nhân Tông (1066–1127)–was highly regarded as the most capable one in all kings of Lý was also the one that further concentrated on improving economic conditions for people to make their livings. He commanded the building of Cổ Xá dyke along the part of Red River flowing through Thăng Long (Hanoi) to protect the capital city from unexpected floods. Killing of buffalos and oxen–used by Viet people for rice field ploughing–was strictly prohibited. He also proactively sought to further develop the market system in Thăng Long, together with transport means for goods. As a consequence of his policies, artisans focused on manufacturing a variety of consumers’ goods such as dyestuff, fabrics, paper, copper, furniture, and so on.

Under Trần Dynasty (1225–1400), Thăng Long continued to be an economic and industrial hub, and reached a somewhat higher level of development, perhaps thanks to a reasonably long period of peace and the reputation of a commercial city. Foreign trade then provided more exciting opportunities for both local residents and foreign merchants–mostly Chinese and Ugurian (from Central Asia)–who opened shops for exchanging various consumer's goods. Agriculture also improved with increasing area of cropland gained, which had been reclaimed by military force and ordinary people, and more agricultural lands were better irrigated. The economic development policies adopted by early Trần's kings inherited the idea formulated by one of the most well-known senior general of Vietnam's history–Trần Thủ Độ–who had decided to bolster the economic development of the capital city by more economic reform so that savings and wealth could help contribute to a bolstered military force. The Trần Dynasty was best known for its three triumphant defeats of the formidable and mighty arm forces of the Mongols–in 1258, 1285 and 1288–which had swept through many Asian and European borders in the 18th century.

In an early modern history book, Việt Nam Sử Lược, one could see clearly that throughout the history, Vietnam's economic activities had been rarely mentioned and clearly poorly documented. However, it did mention that gold had been used as money, with unit being a tael. Each tael could be exchanged for 70 quan–the formal coin minted and circulated by the Trần Dynasty in the first half of the 13th century (from 1225 to 1253). The currency was then used to pay personal tax, one quan per head each year. Nonetheless, the most important tax should arguably come from farming production, mostly levied paddy rice fields, and was actually paid in rice. There existed many other type of taxes, such as for production of salt, fish, vegetable, and many other consumers goods alike. Being engaged in series of border wars with its southern neighbor, Champa, Trần Dynasty at times showed its military strength, supported by economic wealth, and gradually implemented a southward expansion. Given the economic prosperity in some substantial periods under the reign of Trần, substantial cultural progress also emerged. Nôm scripts were invented and used in the first place in the 13th century under Trần Nhân Tông (1258–1308). The first history work which was ever written in Vietnam was finished in 1272, Dai Viet Su Ky Toan Thu by the historian Lê Văn Hưu. In this period, economic development served as the main propeller for overall development of the society, as well as the country's territorial expansion.

When the Hồ Dynasty (1400–1407) usurped the throne from the Trần, Hồ Quý Ly also implemented some economic changes, including unifying the weight and volume measure system, improving river-transporting means, establishing administrative system for collecting taxes and fees from merchants, building foodstuff reserve to intervene when market rice prices fluctuating too much, etc. Like previous kings of Trần, he perhaps pursued an improved government budget and arms force. Historians cited reasons of his failures in these reforms as being implemented in very short time and conflict of interests with aristocrats (owners of wealth), merchants, hence urban artisans.

It is noteworthy that a majority of collected taxes and fees by the feudalist central governments in Vietnam's history were used for unproductive reasons, mostly warfare preparation (viz. weapons, military foodstuff reserves), kings' residential palaces, and aristocratic class luxury goods (to their standards). Rarely useful spending was documented for instance dyke building to prevent cropland flood, frequently occurring in the Red River Delta causing famine and starvation of farmers. Taxes were heavy financial burden that ordinary people had to accept. In narrative by historians, tax reduction is always the best thing a king could do to his people, and that is only done a few years after his coronation, then short-lived. Another important economic policy of several good kings is to grant land (including fertile cropland) to the poor people. One typical example is the case of Lê Thái Tổ (1385–1433), the first king of the Second Lê Dynasty crowned in 1428, who redistributed land to not only his subordinates, serving him during the 10-year war with the Ming Dynasty's troops. Supplying foods and foodstuffs to the army is clearly also a very challenging task. Lê Thái Tổ, when engaged in fighting against the Ming's troops, had an army of 250,000. After his victory, the Lê Dynasty still kept 100,000 with the army. Taxpayers, mostly proletarians, were greatly exploited by aristocrats and kings through various kinds of tax and fees to maintain military forces for the powerful feudalist bloodlines.

The third king of the Second Lê reigns, viz. Lê Thánh Tông (1449–1497), proved himself one of the most talented feudalist leaders in the entire history of Vietnam. First, he did not forget to reassure Viet farmers about his economic policies that favored agricultural production. He implemented a set of measures which had been devised to encourage farmers to actively improve both farming techniques and work hours, and to exploit unused lands for cultivation, expanding farm lands further to jungles in the rural areas of his kingdom. But his policies also reflected an adequate concern of and a forward-looking view towards developing a better and thriving commercial urban city Thăng Long (viz. the capital city in his time, and today's Hanoi). He paid substantial attentions and made incessant efforts to encourage trade activities, to significantly improve road and river transportation, to establish many new markets as well as new ports along major rivers and at important coastal areas. We could by no means deny the causal nexus between the boom of trade activities and domestic manufacturing capacity, which in our very modern theories would induce each other, especially when growth is on upswing. Clearly his situation, positive effects brought about by Lê Thánh Tông's economic policies were further bolstered with help of a reasonably long period of peace.

This king was going even further in his decisive promotion of economic growth by re-planning the then-largest urban area of Thăng Long to conceptually consist of 36 trading streets, each was somewhat specialized in a specific categories of related goods. Today Hanoi could still be referred to as "36 Phố Phường"–viz. the city of 36 trading streets–without ambiguity to any Vietnamese of the modern day. Thus, his vision was beyond many think-tanks of his time. Not long after this, his economic plan and policies started flowering. Artisan-residents and skilled workers from outside then poured their investments in Thăng Long, hence further attracting more merchants from different places, in seeking entrepreneurial opportunities in a promising land. What historians learn from this period is that the boom of entrepreneurship, commerce, manufacturing techniques and transportation are all at the same time, in the same place. Things that are worthwhile even today were then high quality silk, embroidery, and embroidered cloths, hand-made jewelry, furniture, copper appliances, leather products, casting technique, printing services, etc. A major weakness of the economy under his reign was inadequate activity of foreign trade.

However, this was something he could not achieve by himself, despite his commitment to trade and economic development. Despite the limitations of foreign trade under the Lê dynasty, Lê Thánh Tông maintained an active foreign trade port at Vân Đồn, one of the five major ports in the country's premodern history. His economic policies encouraged entrepreneurial activities among urban residents and farmers. In this thriving society, the general standard of living improved significantly compared with that of many earlier societies and possibly some later ones. Development also advanced in other areas, including culture and science. Periods of comparable entrepreneurial activity were relatively uncommon. However, economic data and detailed information on economic activities during this long historical period are limited, making a sociocultural analysis of overall economic development necessary.

At the end of the 16th century, the country was again moving into a long period that witnessed a series of brutal civil wars, from 1627 to 1672, between two major noble bloodlines, Lord Trịnh and Lord Nguyễn. They both had many members of the family holding high-ranks in the Second Lê Dynasty. In fact, these two Lords had firm grips of power of the whole country, thus de facto divided it into the North and the South, with Trịnh controlling the North and Nguyên the South, putting the King of Lê then in a powerless position only. These two political powers remained in high hostility for a long period of 150 years, from 1627 to 1777.

In the South (usually referred to as Đàng Trong), foreign trade started to emerge in the early 17th century, with Portuguese traders being first foreign businesspeople coming first to Hoi An port town near Đà Nẵng, almost the same period when the Dutch occupied Java islands of today's Indonesia in 1594. It was said that Jean de la Croix was the first Portuguese to have established a cannon molding mill–perhaps a lucrative business operation–in Thuận Hóa town, near Hue in the central region in 1614. The French arrived in Hội An port city in 1686. More importantly, French ship Machault embarked on Hội An in 1749 and presented a letter proposing first formal diplomatic relationship with Lord Nguyên, which received his warm regard.

In the north, the presence of Portuguese ships and sailors was noticed also in the early 17th century. Gradually a commercial town in today's Hưng Yên Province, called Phố Yên, emerged firstly with trading shops owned by Dutch traders in 1637. This town for a period became the commercial hub in the north with exciting trading opportunities for both local and foreign traders. Following Portuguese and Dutch businessmen, many Japanese, Chinese, Siamese (Thai) tradesmen arrived and set up commercial operation in this town, making it the second most important urban areas in the North, only after Thăng Long. That town at the peak of its flourishing business season had over 2,000 shops in a small area—a high density of business activities. The boom of trade in Vietnam this time even led to the first attempt of romanization of Vietnamese language by Alexandre de Rhodes (1591–1660)—the French Roman Catholic missionary and scholar living in the East Indies in this period, circa 1627–evidenced by his publication Dictionarium Annamiticum Lusitanum et Latinum (viz. Vietnamese – Latin – Portuguese Dictionary), published in Rome in 1651.

=== Early foreign trade ===
In terms of money, Japanese trade coins were circulated or were melted to make utensils as well. Alexandre de Rhodes said in his book that the current coin in the North consisted of large copper coin brought in from Japan and small coin minted locally. Large coins were circulated everywhere, but small coins were used only in the capital and four surrounding districts. The value of the local coin varied depending on the quantities of great cash brought in each year but was normally priced at 10 small cash to 6 large cash (Alexandre de Rhodes, Histoire de royaume de Tunquin, Lyon, 1651).

Some details in the Register of the British East India Company showed the busy activity of coin trade in Phố Hiến as follows.

- Coin Trade in Phố Hiến, 1672–1676
- August 22, 1672: 3 Dutch ships arrived from Batavia bringing 6 million; Japanese cash and 1000 tael of silver
- April 7, 1675: 1 Chinese junk arrived from Japan with copper cash and silver
- June 17, 1675: 1 Dutch ship arrived from Batavia with 80 chests of Japanese cash
- February 23, 1676: 2 Chinese junks arrived from Japan to bring silver and cash

English traders also came to do business in Vietnam in 1672 or so, with the first ship Zant visiting and asking for licence of the first shop in Phố Hiến. They ceased to do trading here because the profit was not as expected and left in 1697. The French came in town in 1680, followed by the French ship Saint Joseph in 1682. Trading activity in the North (Đàng Ngoài) saw a sharp decline when Dutch businessmen stopped their operation in 1700. Foreign trade was further weakened by increasing religious conflicts between both Lord Trịnh and Lord Nguyễn with Roman Catholic missionaries and followers delivering their religious teachings in both Đàng Ngoài and Đàng Trong. After 1700, not much about trade with foreign businessmen was documented by historians, giving us a tacit understanding that the first 90-year efflorescence of foreign trade stopped by the early 18th century. Even with the most optimistic mind, we could not assume that this trade boom to have continued beyond 1750 since Vietnam, already divided by Nguyễn and Trịnh, was now engaged in a new long period of civil war among Trịnh, Nguyễn bloodlines and the rising Tây Sơn–which started gathering military strength from 1771–sometimes interfered by foreign military powers, namely the Siamese (1782–1785) and the Chinese Qing (1789). Nguyễn Huệ, later becoming King of the Nguyễn Tây Sơn Dynasty in 1788, defeated Siamese naval troops in 1785 and the Qing army, whose military assistances had been invited by Nguyễn Ánh and the last King of Lê Dynasty–Lê Chiêu Thống–in 1789. The Nguyễn Tây Sơn Dynasty lasted for only 14 years, put to an end by the rise to kingship of Lord Nguyễn Ánh in 1802.

=== Industry in Nguyễn Tây Sơn ===
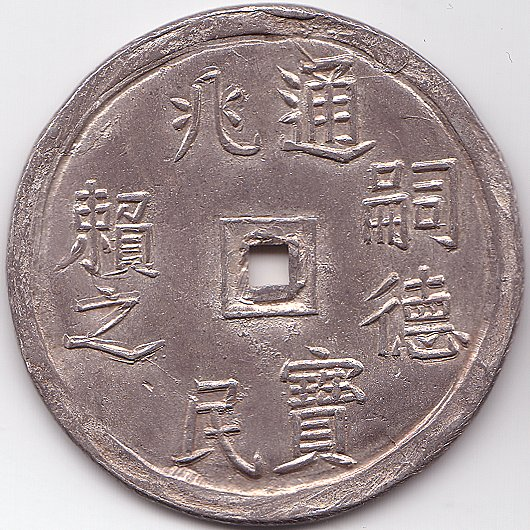
A silver coin minted during Tự Đức (1848-1883), Nguyễn dynasty period, 19th century

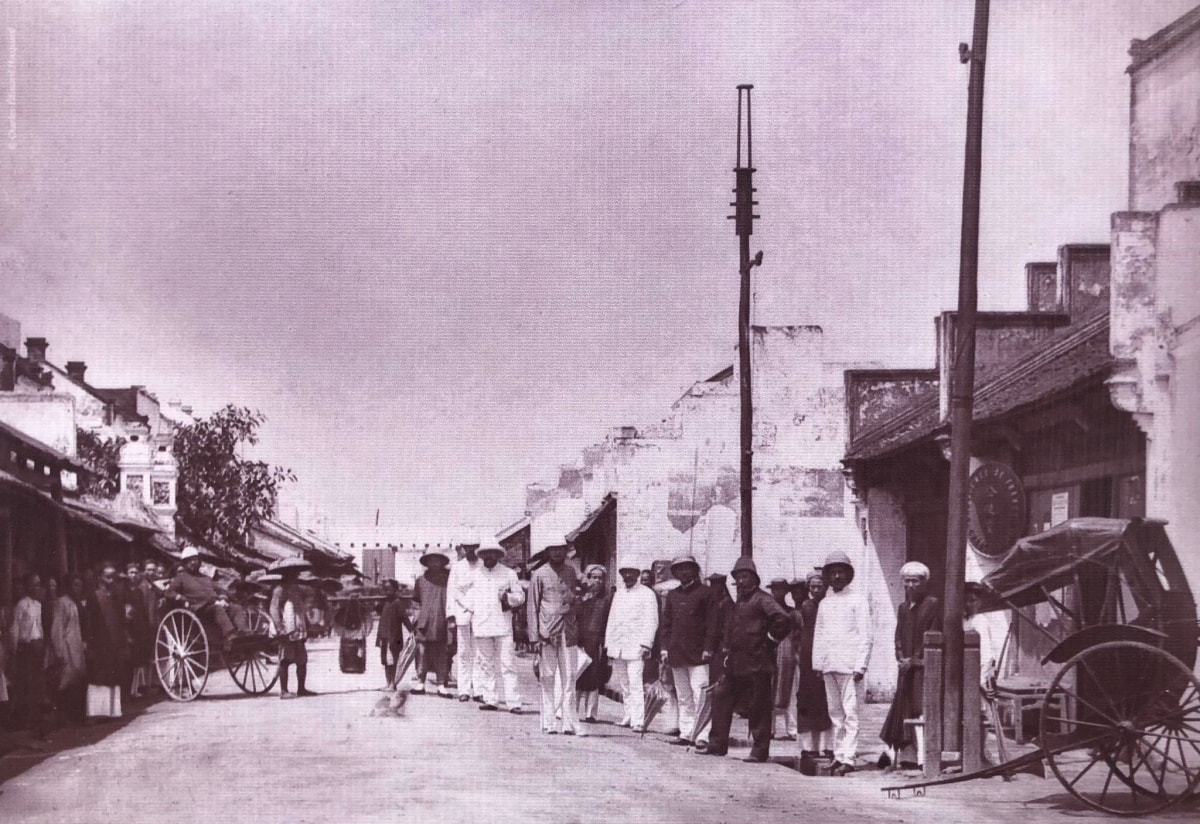
Hanoi Silk Market (Hàng Gai) street, circa 1884

In most works, when writing this part of the history, Vietnamese historians usually extol Quang Trung Nguyễn Huệ of the Tây Sơn with flowery words on his brilliant military victories over Siamese and Qing invading forces. Nonetheless, from the economic view, he did not perform well since being engaged in non-stop military battles no real effort was made for reconstructing the economy in bad shape, or at least no words were found writing about any measures of boosting trades, agricultural production or industrial manufacturing. Meanwhile, Nguyễn Ánh (1777–1820) the male heir of the powerful lords of Nguyễn in Đàng Trong who had been orphaned by the Tây Sơn Nguyễn brothers, nurtured his plan to come back in power, then quietly returned to the South coastal provinces. He made a wise move of encouraging economic activities, especially farming and expanding cropland. Soldiers were also requested to participate in crop harvest. His economic policy on trade was also purposeful. To have sufficient funds to purchase metals and explosives, foreign merchants were encouraged to trade in his territories. Trades were performed on arm's-length basis using market price. Domestic merchants were allowed to barter-trade with foreigners for weapons and military materials.

When Nguyễn Ánh took power in 1802, after the death of Quang Trung Nguyễn Huệ and the rupture of Tây Sơn Dynasty's military muscles, he employed a number of appropriate economic policies, namely clear stipulation of tax system, tax reduction for regions facing difficulty such as natural catastrophe, low agricultural yield, draught, etc. Minting coins was organized with clear rules and monitored closely by the government. In monetary term, one tael of gold was in exchange of 10 taels of silver. Where appropriate and necessary, the government established new coin-minting mill, ensuring the adequacy of money for trade and economic activity. Apart from silver and gold coins, lower-value coins were also minted by the government, consisting of copper and zinc coins from 1803, viz. his second year as king. The government also stipulated the weight measure systems to facilitate trade. In addition, roads were repaired or built new. Dykes and irrigation systems were renovated and protected to facilitate agricultural production. Rice reserves were built in many towns so that in emergency, the government could supply food to people in time.

Persistent states and detrimental impacts of feudalist warfare are the main characteristic of this 2,500-year part of Vietnam's premodern history. Stable economic development could hardly be attained even in the 17th century when trades became more active and economic conditions improved briefly in temporary peace. In pecuniary terms, both governments of Đàng Ngoài and Đàng Trong performed poorly, with persistent budget deficit–although not very serious–in mid-17th century (1746–1753). Trades, usually a precursor to any prosperous society, almost disappeared in this period, and reappeared only sporadically. Towards the end of this period, it was fortunate that King Gia Long Nguyễn Ánh now displayed a set of "fairly" efficient economic policies which helped restore the economic conditions in part, although we have not had sufficient statistics to make an appraisal on the actual output improvement under the reign of Gia Long.

However, after King Gia Long, the Nguyễn Dynasty was not able to hold firm grip of power for long. Military conflicts with French soon turned out escalated wars in all major regions and led to French protectorate agreements, a starting point for the next 80 years of the French colonization. It is not unexpected that no major economic progress was documented for this period.

== 1954-1975 ==
When the North and South were divided politically in 1954, they also adopted different economic ideologies, one communist and one capitalist. In the North, the communist regime's First Five-Year Plan (1961–65) gave priority to heavy industry, but priority subsequently shifted to agriculture and light industry. All private enterprise and private ownership was prohibited.

During the 1954-75 Vietnam War, United States air strikes in the North, beginning in early 1965, slowed large-scale construction considerably as laborers were diverted to repairing bomb damage. By the end of 1966, serious strains developed in the North's economy as a result of war conditions. Interruptions in electric power, the destruction of petroleum storage facilities, industrial and manufacturing facilities, and labor shortages led to a slowdown in industrial and agricultural activity. The disruption of transportation routes by U.S. bombing further slowed distribution of raw materials and consumer goods. Hanoi reported that in the North, all 6 industrial cities, 28 out of 30 provincial towns, 96 out of 116 district towns, and 4,000 out of 5,788 communes were either severely damaged or destroyed. All power stations, 1,600 hydraulics works, 6 railway lines, all roads, bridges, and sea and inland ports were seriously damaged or destroyed. In addition, 400,000 cattle were killed, and several thousand square kilometres of farmland were damaged. The Northern economy conducted trade almost exclusively with the USSR and its Eastern Bloc states and communist China, receiving substantial financial, material, and technical aid from the USSR and China to support the Northern economy, infrastructure and their war effort.

Meanwhile, South Vietnam's free market economy conducted extensive trade with other anti-communist or non-communist countries, such as the US, Canada, France, West Germany, Japan and Thailand. The Southern economy between 1954 and 1975 became increasingly dependent on foreign aid, particularly in the late 60s until the Fall of Saigon. The United States, the foremost donor, helped finance the development of the military and the construction of roads, bridges, airfields and ports; supported the currency; and met the large deficit in the balance of payments. Destruction attributed to the Vietnam War was considerable, especially due to very frequent Viet Cong rocket attacks and bombings of residential and commercial areas, industrial facilities, roads, bridges, rail-lines, sea and airports; widespread US aerial bombing raids on suspected communist hideouts, and intra-city fighting such as during the 1968 Tet Offensive. As a result, much financial resources and the labour force was diverted for reconstruction. Economic activity in less populated areas of South Vietnam was limited in part due to wartime destruction and large numbers of civilians fleeing from war zones and Viet Cong-held areas, atop of increased inaccessibility between many of these rural areas across the Mekong Delta, Central Highlands and inland Central Vietnam with urban areas along the coast, resultant from damaged or destroyed transportation infrastructure by the Viet Cong or Allied Forces and/or by the Viet Cong forcibly restricting flow of people in and out of rural areas they held. A 2017 study in the journal Diplomatic History found that South Vietnamese economic planners sought to model the South Vietnamese economy on Taiwan and South Korea, which were perceived as successful examples of how to modernize developing economies.

A significant economic potential that South Vietnam had was the oil reserves in the South China Sea. In 1973, the South Vietnamese government held a tender for nine of the 40 oil blocks. Pecten-Vietnam (owned by Shell) won three blocks (3, 7, 11), Mobil Oil of the United States won two blocks (4 & 8), Sunningdale of Canada won two (21 & 22), and Esso of the United States won one (10). These four companies paid the government $16.6 million for the bids. In 1974, five more lots were opened, with Union Texas, Mobil Oil, Marathon-Sun-Ameralda-Hess, and Pecten-Vietnam winning the bids and paying the government $29.1 million. Oil exploration in South Vietnam began in August 1974 when Pecten's Ocean Prospector rig reached the continental shelf. It immediately encountered difficulties due to rough seas. Pecten drilled four wells: Hong 1X, Dua 1X, Dua 2X, and Mia 1X. The Hong 1X well was the first to be drilled, reaching a depth of 1,609m and discovering oil and gas, but not enough for industrial production. Pecten was luckier with the Dua 1X well, reaching a depth of 4,500m in mid-October 1974 and discovering a flow rate of 2,200 barrels of oil and 480,000 m³ of gas per day. In just eight months, Pecten drilled four wells, and the final drill at the Dua 2X well, which remained unfinished at a depth of 1,800m. The year 1975 saw Mobil Oil construct Beryl A, the first offshore oil production platform made out of concrete. In February 1975, Mobil also struck oil in the Bạch Hổ field in the South China Sea with a production capacity of 2,500 barrels per day, and South Vietnamese President Nguyễn Văn Thiệu flew to the Glomar IV oil rig to witness the results. However, due to the war situation, these companies withdrew from South Vietnam in April before they could exploit.

For Vietnam as a whole, the war resulted in some 3 million military and civilian deaths, 362,000 invalids, 1 million widows, and 800,000 orphans. The country sustained a further loss in human capital through the exodus of political refugees from Vietnam after the communist victory in the South. According to the United Nations High Commission for Refugees, as of October 1982 approximately 1 million people had fled Vietnam. Among them were tens of thousands of professionals, intellectuals, technicians, and skilled workers.

== Subsidy period: 1976-1986 ==
Vietnam was reunited under the communist regime of the North in 1976. The Vietnamese economy is shaped primarily by the VCP through the plenary sessions of the Central Committee and national congresses. The party plays a leading role in establishing the foundations and principles of communism, mapping strategies for economic development, setting growth targets, and launching reforms.

Planning is a key characteristic of centralized, communist economies, and one plan established for the entire country normally contains detailed economic development guidelines for all its regions. According to Vietnamese economist Vo Nhan Tri, Vietnam's post-reunification economy was in a "period of transition to socialism." The process was described as consisting of three phases. The first phase, from 1976 through 1980, incorporated the Second Five-Year Plan (1976–80)--the First Five Year Plan (1960–65) applied to North Vietnam only. The second phase, called "socialist industrialization", was divided into two stages: from 1981 through 1990 and from 1991 through 2005. The third phase, covering the years 2006 through 2010, was to be time allotted to "perfect" the transition.

The party's goal was to unify the economic system of the entire country under communism. Steps were taken to implement this goal at the long-delayed Fourth National Party Congress, convened in December 1976, when the party adopted the Second Five-Year Plan and defined both its "line of socialist revolution" and its "line of building a socialist economy." The next two congresses, held in March 1982 and December 1986, respectively, reiterated this long-term communist objective and approved the five-year plans designed to guide the development of the Vietnamese economy at each specific stage of the communist revolution.

After the end of the war and reunification in 1976, the VCP implemented a planned economy. Vietnam nationalized the means of production, established state ownership of enterprises (including subsidies to cover losses), output targets set via economic planning, monopolized foreign trade, collectivized agriculture and handicrafts, established agricultural cooperatives with procurement quotas, and adopted state-set prices for goods and services.

The economy of Vietnam was plagued by enormous difficulties in production, imbalances in supply and demand, inefficiencies in distribution and circulation, soaring inflation rates, rising debt problems, governmental corruption and illegal asset confiscations by local authorities. Vietnam is one of the few countries in modern history to experience a sharp economic deterioration in a postwar reconstruction period. Its postwar economy was one of the poorest in the world and showed a negative to very slow growth in total national output as well as in agricultural and industrial production. Vietnam's gross domestic product (GDP) in 1984 was valued at US$18.1 billion with a per capita income estimated to be between US$200 and US$300 per year. Reasons for this mediocre economic performance included adverse climatic conditions that afflicted agricultural crops, bureaucratic mismanagement, elimination of private ownership, extinction of entrepreneurial and professional classes in the South, and the military occupation of Cambodia (which resulted in a cutoff of much-needed international aid for reconstruction).

=== The Second Five-Year Plan (1976-80) ===
The optimism and impatience of Vietnam's leaders were evident in the Second Five-Year Plan. The plan set extraordinarily high goals for the average annual growth rates for industry (16 to 18 percent), agriculture (8 to 10 percent), and national income (13 to 14 percent). It also gave priority to reconstruction and new construction while attempting to develop agricultural resources, to integrate the North and the South, and to proceed with communization.

Twenty years were allowed to construct the material and technical bases of communism. In the South, material construction and systemic transformation were to be combined in order to hasten economic integration with the North. It was considered critical for the VCP to improve and extend its involvement in economic affairs so that it could guide this process. Development plans were to focus equally on agriculture and industry, while initial investment was to favour projects that developed both sectors of the economy. Thus, for example, heavy industry was intended to serve agriculture on the premise that a rapid increase in agricultural production would in turn fund further industrial growth. With this strategy, Vietnamese leaders claimed that the country could bypass the capitalist industrialization stage necessary to prepare for communism.

Vietnam was incapable, however, of undertaking such an ambitious program on its own and solicited financial support for its Second Five-Year Plan from Western nations, international organizations, and communist allies. Although the amount of economic aid requested is not known, some idea of the assistance level envisioned by Hanoi can be obtained from available financial data. The Vietnamese government budget for 1976 amounted to US$2.5 billion, while investments amounting to US$7.5 billion were planned for the period between 1976 and 1980.

The economic aid tendered to Hanoi was substantial, but it still fell short of requirements. The Soviet Union, China, and Eastern Europe offered assistance that was probably worth US$3 billion to US$4 billion, and countries of the Western economic community pledged roughly US$1 billion to US$1.5 billion.

=== The Third Five Year Plan (1981-85) ===
By 1979 it was clear that the Second Five-Year Plan had failed to reduce the serious problems facing the newly unified economy. Vietnam's economy remained dominated by small-scale production, low labour productivity, unemployment, material and technological shortfalls, and insufficient food and consumer goods.

To address these problems, at its Fifth National Party Congress held in March 1982, the VCP approved resolutions on "orientations, tasks and objectives of economic and social development for 1981-85 and the 1980s." The resolutions established economic goals and in effect constituted Vietnam's Third Five-Year Plan (1981–85). Because of the failure of the Second Five-Year Plan, however, the Vietnamese leadership proceeded cautiously, presenting the plan one year at a time. The plan as a whole was neither drawn up in final form nor presented to the National Assembly for adoption.

The economic policies set forth in 1982 resulted from a compromise between ideological and pragmatic elements within the party leadership. The question of whether or not to preserve private capitalist activities in the South was addressed, as was the issue of the pace of the South's communist transformation. The policies arrived at called for the temporary retention of private capitalist activities in order to spur economic growth and the completion, more or less, of a communist transformation in the South by the mid-1980s.

The plan's highest priority, however, was to develop agriculture by integrating the collective and individual sectors into an overall system emphasizing intensive cultivation and crop specialization and by employing science and technology. Economic policy encouraged the development of the family economy; that is, the peasants' personal use of economic resources, including land, not being used by the cooperative. Through use of an end-product contract system introduced by the plan, peasant households were permitted to sign contracts with the collective to farm land owned by the collective. The households then assumed responsibility for production on the plots. If production fell short of assigned quotas, the households were to be required to make up the deficit the following year. If a surplus was produced, the households were to be allowed to keep it, sell it on the free market, or sell it to the state for a "negotiated price." In 1983 the family economy reportedly supplied 50 to 60 percent of the peasants' total income and 30 to 50 percent of their foodstuffs.

Free enterprise was sanctioned, thus bringing to an end the nationalization of small enterprises and reversing former policies that had sought the complete and immediate communization of the South. The new policy especially benefited peasants (including the overwhelming majority of peasants in the South) who had refused to join cooperatives, small producers, small traders, and family businesses.

The effort to reduce the capitalist sector in the South nevertheless continued. Late in 1983, a number of import-export firms that had been created in Ho Chi Minh City (formerly Saigon) to spur the development of the export market were integrated into a single enterprise regulated by the state. At the same time, the pace of collectivization in the countryside was accelerated under the plan. By the end of 1985, Hanoi reported that 72 percent of the total number of peasant households in the South were enrolled in some form of cooperative organization.

Despite the plan's emphasis on agricultural development, the industrial sector received a larger share of state investment during the first two years. In 1982, for example, the approximate proportion was 53 percent for industry compared with 18 percent for agriculture. Limiting state investment in agriculture, however, did not appear to affect total food production, which increased 19.5 percent from 1980 to 1984.

The plan also stressed the development of small-scale industry to meet Vietnam's material needs, create goods for export, and lay the foundation for the development of heavy industry. In the South, this entailed transforming some private enterprises into "state-private joint enterprises" and reorganizing some small-scale industries into cooperatives. In other cases, however, individual ownership was maintained. Investment in light industry actually decreased by 48 percent while investment in heavy industry increased by 17 percent during the first two years of the plan. Nonetheless, the increase in light-industry production outpaced that of heavy industry by 33 percent to 28 percent during the same two-year period.

The July 1984 Sixth Plenum (Fifth Congress) of the VCP Central Committee recognized that private sector domination of wholesale and retail trade in the South could not be eliminated until the state was capable of assuming responsibility for trade. Proposals therefore were made to decentralize planning procedures and improve the managerial skills of government and party officials.

These plans were subsequently advanced at the Central Committee's Eighth Plenum (Fifth Congress) in June 1985. Acting to disperse economic decision making, the plenum resolved to grant production autonomy at the factory and individual farm levels. The plenum also sought to reduce government expenditures by ending state subsidies on food and certain consumer goods for state employees. It further determined that all relevant costs to the national government needed to be accounted for in determining production costs and that the state should cease compensating for losses incurred by state enterprises. To implement these resolutions, monetary organizations were required to shift to modern economic accounting. The government created a new dong in September 1985, and set maximum quotas for the amount permitted to be exchanged in bank notes. The dong also was officially devalued.

== 1986-2000 ==
In 1986 Vietnam launched a political and economic innovation campaign (Đổi Mới) that introduced reforms intended to facilitate the transition from a centralized economy to a "socialist-oriented market economy." Đổi Mới combined government planning with free-market incentives. The program abolished agricultural collectives, removed price controls on agricultural goods, and enabled farmers to sell their goods in the marketplace. Private households obtained land-use rights and were recognized as autonomous economic roles. Đổi Mới encouraged the establishment of private businesses and foreign investment, including foreign-owned enterprises. The state focused on regulatory functions and allowed the prices of goods and services to be set by the market.

Vietnam continues to use five-year plans.

Responding the dissolution of the Soviet Union, Vietnam increased the Đổi Mới reforms and passed a series of enterprise laws to encourage private business. The 1990s enterprise law legalized private enterprises. The 1992 recognized the role of the private sector in the economy. The 1999 law provided a legal framework for all types of enterprises.

By the late 1990s, the success of the business and agricultural reforms ushered in under Doi Moi was evident. More than 30,000 private businesses had been created, and the economy was growing at an annual rate of more than 7 percent. From the early 1990s to 2005, poverty declined from about 50 percent to 29 percent of the population. However, progress varied geographically, with most prosperity concentrated in urban areas, particularly in and around Ho Chi Minh City. In general, rural areas also made progress, as rural households living in poverty declined from 66 percent of the total in 1993 to 36 percent in 2002. By contrast, concentrations of poverty remained in certain rural areas, particularly the northwest, north-central coast, and central highlands.

Government control of the economy and a nonconvertible currency have protected Vietnam from what could have been a more severe impact resulting from the East Asian financial crisis in 1997. Nonetheless, the crisis, coupled with the loss of momentum as the first round of economic reforms ran its course, has exposed serious structural inefficiencies in Vietnam's economy. Vietnam's economic stance following the East Asian recession has been a cautious one, emphasizing macroeconomic stability rather than growth. While the country has shifted toward a more market-oriented economy, the Vietnamese government still continues to hold a tight rein over major sectors of the economy, such as the banking system, state-owned enterprises, and areas of foreign trade. GDP growth fell to 6% in 1998 and 5% in 1999.

== 2000-present ==
The July 13, 2000, signing of the Bilateral Trade Agreement (BTA) between the United States and Vietnam was a significant milestone for Vietnam's economy. The BTA provided for Normal Trade Relations (NTR) status of Vietnamese goods in the U.S. market. Access to the U.S. market will allow Vietnam to hasten its transformation into a manufacturing-based, export-oriented economy. It would also concomitantly attract foreign investment to Vietnam, not only from the U.S., but also from Europe, Asia, and other regions.

In 2000 the Vietnamese Communist Party (VCP) approved a 10-year economic plan that enhanced the role of the private sector while reaffirming the primacy of the state as part of the socialist-oriented market economy. In 2003 the private sector accounted for more than one-quarter of all industrial output, and the private sector's contribution was expanding more rapidly than the public sector's (18.7 percent versus 12.4 percent growth from 2002 to 2003). Growth then rose to 6% to 7% in 2000-02 even against the background of global recession, making it the world's second fastest-growing economy. Simultaneously, investment grew threefold and domestic savings quintupled.

In 2002, Vietnam's stock market opened.

In 2003 the private sector accounted for more than one-quarter of all industrial output. Despite these signs of progress, the World Economic Forum's 2005 Global Competitiveness Report, which reflects the subjective judgments of the business community, ranked Vietnam eighty-first in growth competitiveness in the world (down from sixtieth place in 2003) and eightieth in business competitiveness (down from fiftieth place in 2003), well behind its model China, which ranked forty-ninth and fifty-seventh in these respective categories. Vietnam's sharp deterioration in the rankings from 2003 to 2005 was attributable in part to negative perceptions of the effectiveness of government institutions. Official corruption is endemic despite efforts to curb it. Vietnam also lags behind China in terms of property rights, the efficient regulation of markets, and labor and financial market reforms. State-owned banks that are poorly managed and suffer from non-performing loans still dominate the financial sector.

Vietnam had an average growth in GDP of 7.1% per year from 2000 to 2004. The GDP growth was 8.4% in 2005, the second largest growth in Asia, trailing only China's. Government figures of GDP growth in 2006, was 8.17%. According to Vietnam's Minister of Planning and Investment, the government targets a GDP growth of around 8.5% for 2007.

The enterprise law of 2005 abolished remaining distinctions between state and private enterprises and recognized that it was lawful for private business to be profitable.

On January 11, 2007, Vietnam became WTO's 150th member, after 11 years of preparation, including 8 years of negotiation. Vietnam's access to WTO should provide an important boost to Vietnam's economy and should help to ensure the continuation of liberalizing reforms and create options for trade expansion. However, WTO accession also brings serious challenges, requiring Vietnam's economic sectors to open the door to increased foreign competition.

Although Vietnam's economy, which continues to expand at an annual rate in excess of 7 percent, is one of the fastest-growing in the world, the economy is growing from an extremely low base, reflecting the crippling effect of the Second Indochina War (1954–75) and repressive economic measures introduced in its aftermath. Whether rapid economic growth is sustainable is open to debate. The government may not be able to follow through with plans to scale back trade restrictions and reform state-owned enterprises. Reducing trade restrictions and improving transparency are keys to gaining full membership in the World Trade Organization (WTO), as hoped by mid-2006. The government plans to reform the state-owned sector by partially privatizing thousands of state-owned enterprises, including all five state-owned commercial banks.

The 2015 enterprise law included provisions on investment which replaced provisions under the 2005 enterprise law. It increased the pace of reform of state-owned enterprises. It also expanded permissible private and foreign investment by changing the regulatory approach from a list of specifically permitted sectors for such investment to a "negative list" which prohibited investment only in specified areas.

In 2019, the secretariat of the CPV's central committee instructed that party cells should be developed in all private Vietnamese economic entities. Party cells are tasked with coordinating with management as part of an effort to protect workers' rights, obligations, and interests.

According to the World Bank, Vietnam has been a development success story. Its economic reforms since the beginning of Đổi Mới in 1986 have helped to change Vietnam from being one of the world's poorest nations to a middle-income economy in one generation.

== GDP by year ==
The following table shows the GDP of Vietnam at 2021 constant prices.

Year	GDP (in Bil. USD$PPP)
1970	59.097
1975	56.298
1980	74.337
1985	104.287
1990	127.823
1995	189.602
2000	265.318
2005	377.011
2010	650.208
2015	877.315
2020	1,187.944
2023	1,383.722

== See also ==
- Economy of Vietnam
- Economy of the Republic of Vietnam
- History of Vietnam

== Sources ==
- Cooke, Nola; Li, Tana; Anderson, James, eds. (2011). The Tongking Gulf Through History (illustrated ed.). University of Pennsylvania Press. ISBN 978-0812243369.
- Lary, Diana (2007). Diana Lary (ed.). The Chinese State at the Borders (illustrated ed.). UBC Press. ISBN 978-0774813334.
- Tsai, Shih-Shan Henry (1996). The Eunuchs in the Ming Dynasty (Ming Tai Huan Kuan) (illustrated ed.). SUNY Press. ISBN 0791426874.
- Wade, Geoff (2005), Southeast Asia in the Ming Shi-lu: an open access resource, Asia Research Institute and the Singapore E-Press, National University of Singapore
