= Say Hi to Pencil! =

- Directed by: Huỳnh Thanh Thanh; Phạm Phương Anh
- Screenplay by: Huỳnh Thanh Thanh; Phạm Phương Anh
- Produced by: Huỳnh Thanh Thanh; Phạm Phương Anh
- Edited by: Nguyễn Hữu Tuấn
- Music by: Nguyễn Hữu Tuấn
- Production company: SleepingCatFilm
- Distributed by: SleepingCatFilm
- Release date: 2011
- Running time: 5 minutes/episode
- Country: Vietnam
- Language: Vietnamese

Say Hi to Pencil! (Vietnamese : Xin chào Bút Chì !) is a 2011 Vietnamese clay animation comedy film produced by the group SleepingCatFilm.

== Directed and written ==
Directed and written by: Phuong Anh Pham, Thanh Hynh, Huynh Thanh Thanh. Sound: Huu tuan nguyen .
