= Economy of the Republic of Vietnam =

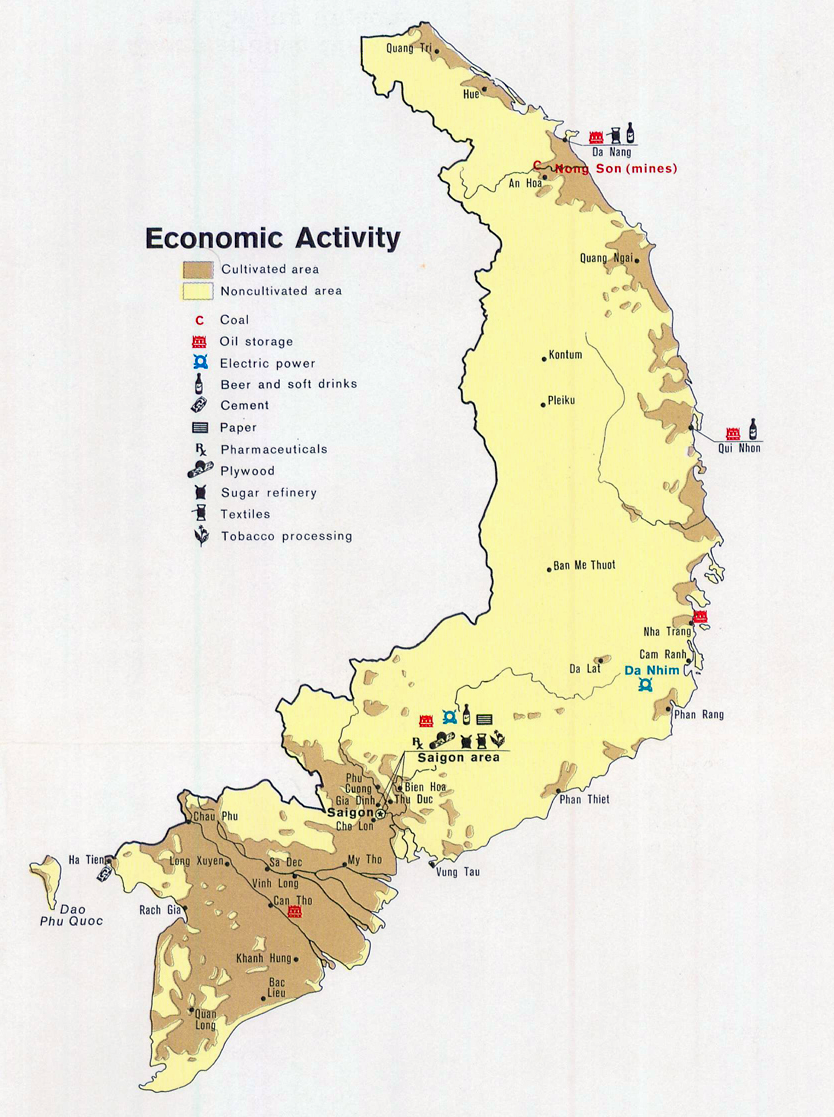
Economic activity of South Vietnam, 1972 (source: CIA)

South Vietnam existing from 1954 to 1975 had a free market economy mostly based on services, agriculture, and aid from the United States. In most of this time, its name was the Republic of Vietnam. Though formally an open market economy, economic development was based largely on five-year economic plans or four-year economic plans. Its economy stayed stable in the 10 first years, then it faced difficulties due to the escalation of the Vietnam War, which led to unsteady economic growth, high state budget deficits, high inflation, and trade deficits. The South Vietnamese government conducted land reforms twice. The United States played an important role in this economy through economic and technical aid, and trade. The United States had been its economic patron since it was still the French-associated State of Vietnam in 1951, when the country was not yet divided.

== Structure ==
=== Agriculture and fishing ===
Agriculture made up around 30% of economic output in South Vietnam, a share that did not vary significantly over the years. South Vietnam's agriculture had a total area of around 6 million ha, mostly in the southern regions (the Mekong River Delta and roughly what is now the Southeast region), while the Central Highlands had few cultivated areas (see map), Other significant agricultural areas were the lowlands along the coast in the north of South Vietnam (central Vietnam including the provinces of Thừa Thiên–Huế, Quảng Nam, Bình Định). The most important crops were rice, rubber, coffee and tea, fruits and vegetables.

=== Industry ===
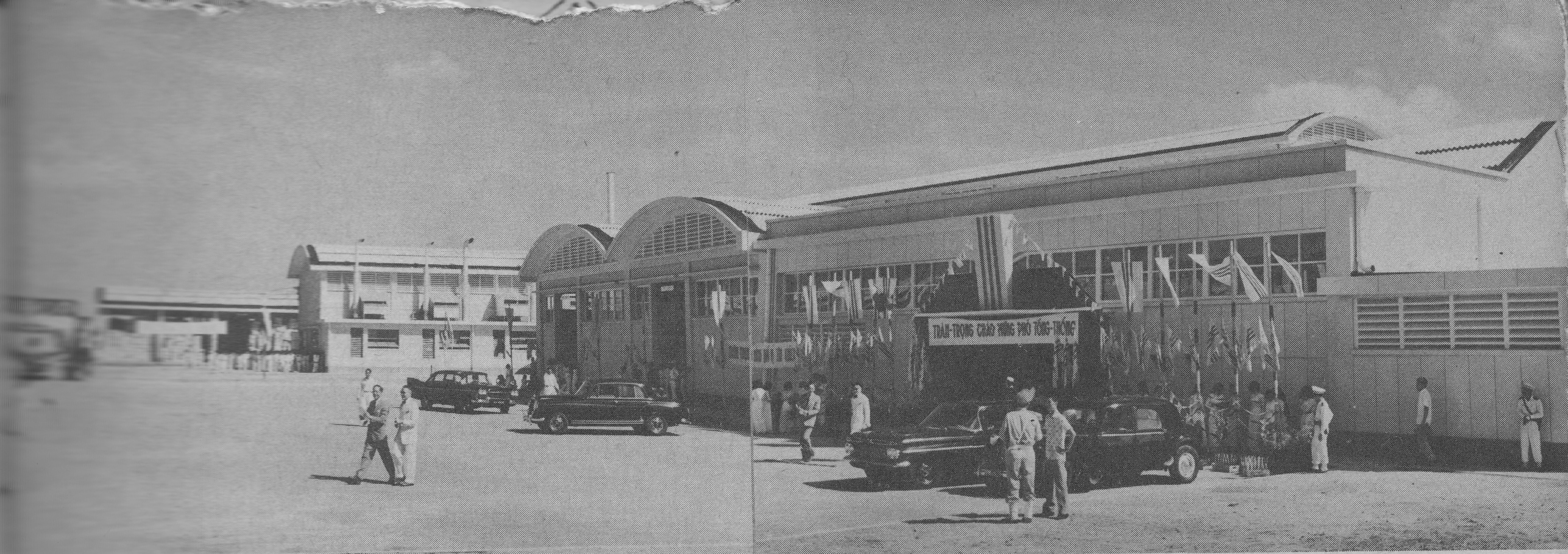
Anhao Paper Factory, 1961

South Vietnam had a small industrial sector and fell far behind other countries in the region in this respect. Output increased 2.5 to 3 times over the 20 years of the country's existence, but the share in total GDP remained at only around 10%, even dropping to 6% in some years, while the economy was dominated by strong agricultural and service sectors. Industry was highly concentrated in Saigon, Biên Hòa, Gia Định, with these three accounting for 85% of industrial companies and 90% of manufacturing output, with some industry in other cities such as Vũng Tàu and Da Nang. Industrial production was highly dependent on imported inputs (some as part of aid programs) and mostly oriented towards local markets, while exports were dominated by agricultural and sea products.

When the republic was established, there were a few industrial facilities left over from the French colonial period, including some tobacco factories, beverages and alcohol, two sugar processing factories (Hiệp Hòa and Khánh Hội), a few machinery factories, and Michelin rubber processing plants. There were some industrial businesses run by local Chinese, including textiles, food processing, while local Vietnamese people had only workshop-size industrial activities. South Vietnam's industry benefited from the immigration of industrialists from North Vietnam who brought with them capital and technology starting with Operation Passage to Freedom in 1954.

Food processing and textiles became the largest industries by 1967, both having increased their capital ten-fold and employing over 17000 workers each. Other important industries included paper, rubber, basic chemicals, and cement. After 1965 industry suffered from escalating warfare and increasing inflows of American consumer goods. Some industries were able to continue growing rapidly, including food processing, wood processing, construction materials, and metals.

South Vietnam's industry suffered from the departure of foreign troops in the early 1970s, which resulted in significantly less demand. Industrial output shrank by 5% in 1972 and by over 20% in 1973 and 1974. By 1973 food processing was by far the largest industry in terms of output (almost half of the total industrial output of 448 billion dong), followed by textiles (around 1/5 of total output, but the largest employer with 32,489 out of 111,964 workers) and chemicals (1/10) (in terms of capital, electricity was the largest industry).

=== Services ===
Over the 20 years of South Vietnam's existence, the share of services in the economy grew from around 45% to 50-60%.

== Growth stages ==
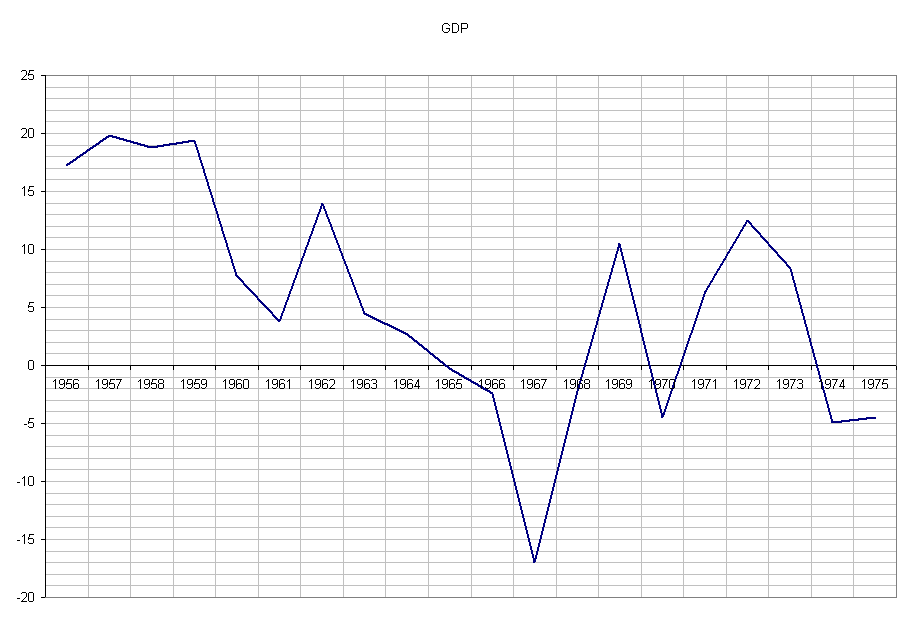
Annual GDP growth of the Republic of Vietnam

GDP of the North and South Vietnam (unit: billion USD, 2015 price).

Year	1956	1958	1960	1963	1965	1967	1968	1970	1972	1973	1974
South Vietnam	11.283	12.714	15.274	16.422	13.515	-	-	10.917	9.140	10.030	10.285
North Vietnam	2.587	-	4.113	4.702	6.000	6.406	6.983	10.689	11.313	11.145	11.026

GDP per capita of the North and South Vietnam (unit: USD)

Year	1956	1958	1960	1962	1964	1966	1968	1970	1972	1974
South Vietnam	62	88	105	100	118	100	85	81	90	65
North Vietnam	40	50	51	68	59	60	55	60	60	65

=== Before 1965 ===
Pre-1965 period saw a rather rapid GDP growth rate of the South Vietnam's economy, accompanied by a reasonable CPI rise. The state budget of the Republic of Vietnam enjoyed a surplus in the early stage but soon turned into deficit from 1961. Investment remained strong, industry and agriculture generally retained a high growth rate. In 1955, the government of Ngô Đình Diệm founded the National Bank, Foreign Exchange Bureau, issued new currency replacing French Indochinese piastre and defined the exchange rate of dong against USD at 35:1. Land reform was conducted and lasted until 1960. Unused lands were seized and redistributed to the farmers. Land ownership was limited to 1 square kilometre per person, the left area of this ownership limit was to sell to the government, and the government in turn would resell to the needed peasants. Peasants and land owners had to sign land use contract, according to which land rent was a mandatory article. The series of land forms led to the ownership of two-thirds land in the South Vietnam to the wealthy land owners. Therefore, the government of Nguyễn Văn Thiệu reimplemented land reform to change this situation. In 1956, the Republic of Vietnam passed a constitution in which the establishment and role of the National Economic Council was specified. This council was chaired by the Vice President of the Republic of Vietnam. In the same year, this country joined the International Monetary Fund (IMF). In March 1957, Ngô Đình Diệm proclaimed Declaration of the President of the 1st Republic (Tuyên ngôn của Tổng thống Đệ nhất Cộng hòa), calling upon foreign and domestic private investment and committing the governmental protection of the investors’ benefits as well as investment encourange policies (preferable tax rates, land rent, income tax…).

The government of Ngô Đình Điệm carried out a policy of export-oriented industrialization to replace imported goods and set up trade protectionism, tariff and non-tariff barriers were created to protect light industrial businesses. The result of this policy brought about the first paper factory of Vietnam, An Hao Paper Factory (1961) in Bien Hoa which supplied 30-40% domestic paper demand. Imports of machinery, equipment, metals – the input factors of the protected industries were given priority, at the same time, export enjoyed encourage measures with several exported good received governmental subsidiary. The exchange rate got adjustment in favor of export. Export of this country gained smooth achievement in 1955-1965. The government implemented its roles in the economic development through five-year economic plans from 1957 to 1962.

Economy of the Republic of Vietnam in this period proved to be progressive, however, political conflicts and unrests (armed conflicts between factions, continuous coup d'état, emergence of the Viet Cong) confined the efficiency of those policies.

=== 1965–1969 stage ===
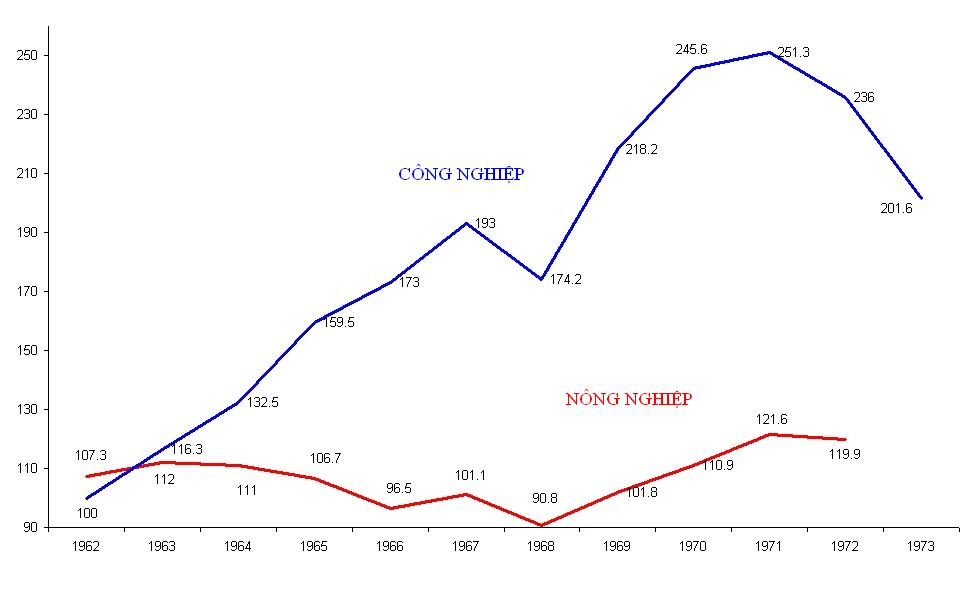
Trend of industrial, agricultural development of the Republic of Vietnam

In this period, the underground economy was booming, the budget deficit soared, hyperinflation afflicted the economy and the currency was repeatedly devalued, resulting in an economic depression. The warfare caused negative impact on economic growth, especially the large scale Tet Offensive in 1968.

View chart definition.
Rice production in 1000 tons

In 1965, South Vietnam went from being a rice exporter to an importer. Rice imports continued until the dissolution of the state in 1975. This was caused by declines in crop harvests from 1965 to 1968. The production levels began to rise from 1968 onwards due to the expansion of ricelands and increased productivity. This was caused by the increasing use of chemical fertilizers, mechanization and new high-yield crop varieties. The right reason for rice import until 1975 was that the rice demand in VC-controlled zones increased, a demand accompanied by more and more intrusion of North Vietnamese troops to the South Vietnam.

From 1965, export-oriented industrialization policy had to suspense, this led to difficulties to many newly established sectors like textile, cane sugar while some other sectors gained the favorable to development. Industry continued to grow, except in 1968 and 1972 when industry came to a standstill in the context of the soaring war (Tet Offensive and aerial raids of North Vietnam).

A notable event incurred in this period, known by its code name as Campaign of Bong Lan (Chiến dịch Bông Lan). This was a currency reform conducted by Nguyễn Văn Thiệu's administration from June 18, 1966 in which new bank notes were issued and commonly known as "bank notes of the second Republic.

=== 1969–1975 period ===
On 26 August 1970 US ambassador Ellsworth Bunker informed President Richard Nixon that South Vietnam seemed to rely on the United States not only for military support but also for the basic economic commodities that sustained its life. Overwhelmingly dependent on imports, most of which were financed through US aid or American military purchases of piasters at a subsidized rate of exchange, it thus continued to procure more than $750 million in goods and services per year abroad while exporting at best $15 million in locally produced merchandise.

The economy of South Vietnam faced difficulties caused by sudden decrease of demand as the US and its allies steadily reduced their armed forces from South Vietnam over the 1970-72 period. Budget deficit soared regardless of the fact that domestic budget revenues and the US aids increased while the government had to take responsibility for military actions on its own. Hyperinflation incurred in this period. In 1970, the inflation rate (based on CPI in ordinary people Saigonese people) reached up to 36.8%, and in 1973 this rate rose to 44.5%. In last years of the Republic of Vietnam's existence, the government went on to introduce import limitations, export incentives, and encouraged domestic consumption. This led to the rise of exports, and a simultaneous rise in imports.

=== Post 1975 ===
After 1975, the economy of Vietnam was plagued by enormous difficulties in production, imbalances in supply and demand, inefficiencies in distribution and circulation, soaring inflation rates, and rising debt problems. Vietnam was one of the few countries in modern history to experience a sharp economic deterioration in a postwar reconstruction period. Its peacetime economy was one of the poorest in the world and showed negative to very slow growth in total national output as well as in agricultural and industrial production. Vietnam's gross domestic product (GDP) in 1984 was valued at US$18.1 billion with a per capita income estimated to be between US$200 and US$300 per year. Reasons for this mediocre economic performance included severe climatic conditions that afflicted agricultural crops, bureaucratic mismanagement, elimination of private ownership, extinction of entrepreneurial classes in the South, and military occupation of Cambodia (which resulted in a cutoff of much-needed international aid for reconstruction). With the start of the Đổi Mới economic reforms in 1986 the Vietnamese economy began to improve.

== Trade ==
South Vietnam's major import sources are the United States, France, and Japan. Kerosene, medicines, iron and steel, equipment, and fertilizers were major imports prior to 1965. This represents the Republic of Vietnam's progress toward industrialization. Rice, consumer products, petrol, and supplies were the most major imports after 1965. The difference in import structure before and after 1965 was mostly due to the impact of the war on local output and demand. South Vietnam's production was stagnant, therefore consumer goods imports increased. Likewise, as military supplies increased, so did imports of supplies and raw materials.

At one point there were minor commercial relations between the Republic of Vietnam and the Democratic Republic of Vietnam, these interactions ceased in 1959, when political ties between the two sides deteriorated.

== See also ==
- Commercial Import Program
- Economic history of Vietnam
- For more information see the Vietnamese language version of this article
