= Flowerpot Men =

Flowerpot Men may refer to:

- Bill and Ben, the Flower Pot Men, a BBC TV children's TV series
- The Flower Pot Men, a British pop group, 1960s
- The Flowerpot Men, a British music group, 1980s
