= In the Shade of Trees =

2011 Vietnamese animated film

- Poster.
- Directed by: Đoàn Trần Anh Tuấn
- Written by: Đoàn Trần Anh Tuấn; Đỗ Thị Minh Thư; Nguyễn Hòa Thanh; Vương Bích Vân
- Produced by: Đoàn Trần Anh Tuấn
- Starring: Đoàn Trần Anh Tú; Đỗ Thị Minh Thư
- Cinematography: Nguyễn Hòa Thanh
- Edited by: Đoàn Trần Anh Tuấn
- Music by: Đoàn Trần Anh Tuấn; Đỗ Thị Minh Thư
- Production company: Colory Animation Studio
- Distributed by: Colory Animation Studio
- Release date: May 21, 2011
- Running time: 7 minutes
- Country: Vietnam
- Language: Vietnamese

In the Shade of Trees (Vietnamese: Dưới bóng cây) is a 2011 Vietnamese computer-animated comedy-adventure film produced by Colory Animation Studio.

== Cast ==
- Đoàn Trần Anh Tú as Mouse
- Đỗ Thị Minh Thư as Frog
