= Sexpionage =

Use of sexual activity in espionage

Sexpionage is the involvement of sexual activity (or the possibility of sexual activity), intimacy, romance, or seduction in espionage. Sex, or the possibility of sex, can function as a distraction, incentive, cover story, or unintended part of any intelligence operation. A commonly known type of sexpionage is a honey trap operation, which is designed to compromise an opponent sexually to elicit information from that person.

Sexpionage is a historically documented phenomenon, though a 2008 CIA review of intelligence in public literature called The Intelligence Officer’s Bookshelf, compiled and reviewed by Hayden B. Peake, noted that then-recent books on the subject suffered from factual errors and a lack of supporting documentation.

== Soviet Union and Russia ==
In the Soviet Union, female agents assigned to use such tactics were referred to as "sparrows", while male agents were known as "ravens".

Yakov Agranov, deputy of the NKVD, known as one of main organizers of Soviet political repressions and Stalinist show trials in 1920s and 1930s, was responsible for sex spy operations among creative-class intelligentsia. He used Bolshoi ballerinas, as well as cinema and theater actresses. Agranov created a school named the Lenin Technical School (Ленинская техническая школа). The school was opened in 1931 by Vyacheslav Menzhinsky, who was the head of the Joint State Political Directorate. According to legend, Richard Sorge and Nikolai Kuznetsov studied at a Moscow Sexpionage school.

=== Kazan, Tatarstan sexpionage school ===
According to former CIA officer Jason Matthews, the Soviet Union had a sexpionage school called "State School 4" in Kazan, Tatarstan, southeast of Moscow, on the banks of the Volga river. The school trained female agents to be "swallows". This school was depicted in Matthews' 2013 novel Red Sparrow. In 2018, a film of the same name was adapted from it.

Matthews believes that although the Kazan school has been closed, Russia now uses independent contractors as honey traps. Matthews has said, "If a human target with access to classified information went to Moscow [today], he’d probably see a modern-day Swallow at one of the bars of the five-star hotels in Moscow."

=== Specific examples ===
In a 2015 lecture, former CIA officer Jonna Mendez explained how Czechoslovak husband and wife KGB spies Karl and Hana Koecher used sex to infiltrate the CIA and gather top-secret information. One popular Washington, D.C., swinger club frequented by the couple counted at least 10 CIA staffers and a United States senator as members.

In 2018, Mendez told The New York Times that an American Marine stationed at the American embassy in Moscow was seduced by a sparrow, and subsequently allowed Russian agents onto the property. Mendez said China and other countries also had such programs.

In 1963, the playwright and screenwriter Yuri Krotkov defected to the West. He revealed that he had been told by the KGB to seek out attractive young women who could be used to seduce men. He would recruit actresses while doing film work, promising better film roles, money and clothes.

Trapped targets during the Soviet Union period included:

1. Sukarno, President of Indonesia;
2. Maurice Dejean, French ambassador in the 1950s;
3. Clayton J. Lonetree, a Marine guarding the US embassy;
4. Roy Guindon, a Canadian diplomat;
5. Col. Louis Guibaud, a French military attache who committed suicide;
6. Jeremy Wolfenden, a homosexual British journalist in Moscow in the early 1960s;
7. John Watkins, homosexual Canadian ambassador in Moscow in 1954;
8. Geoffrey Harrison, British ambassador;
9. U.S. Army Major James R. Holbrook;
10. William John Vassall, a homosexual British navy clerk;
11. British MP Anthony Courtney;

The Washington Post reported in 1987 that "most westerners who have spent any length of time in Moscow have their favorite tale of an attempted seduction by a KGB swallow or raven."

== United States ==
Former Assistant FBI Director William C. Sullivan, in testimony before the Church Committee on November 1, 1975, stated: "The use of sex is a common practice among intelligence services all over the world. This is a tough, dirty business. We have used that technique against the Soviets. They have used it against us."

Aleksandr Ogorodnik, Russian Ministry of Foreign Affairs' planning department, was codenamed TRIGON by the Central Intelligence Agency. He dated a Spanish woman who was recruited by the CIA. In 1973, she persuaded him to supply the CIA with information.

== United Kingdom ==
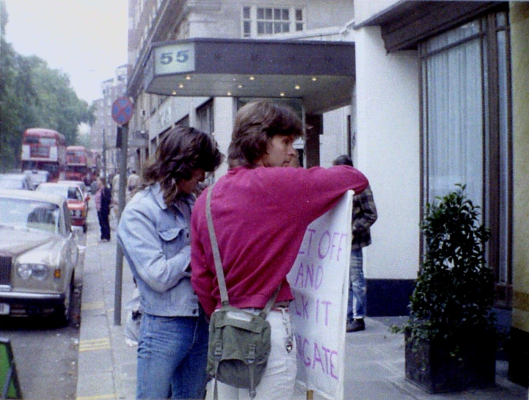
Bob Lambert fathered a child with one target.

Around the end of 2010 and during 2011, it was disclosed in UK media that a number of undercover police officers had, as part of their 'false persona', entered into intimate relationships with members of targeted groups and in some cases proposed marriage or fathered children with protesters who were unaware their partner was a police officer in a role as part of their official duties. In the majority of publicly reported cases these police officers were male "ravens".

== China ==
=== Shi Pei Pu ===
Shi Pei Pu (Chinese: 时佩璞; pinyin: Shí Pèipú; 21 December 1938 – 30 June 2009) was a Chinese opera singer and spy for the People's Republic of China. He obtained classified information from Bernard Boursicot, an employee at the French embassy, during a 20-year sexual relationship in which he convinced Boursicot that he was a woman. Shi also claimed to have a child, a Uyghur boy whom he insisted was the result of their relationship. The case drew significant media attention in France when the true circumstances were revealed.

=== Katrina Leung ===
Katrina Leung (simplified Chinese: 陈文英; traditional Chinese: 陳文英; pinyin: Chén Wényīng; born 1954) is a former high value Federal Bureau of Investigation (FBI) informant and Ministry of State Security (MSS) agent who, on April 9, 2003, was indicted by the United States Department of Justice for "Unauthorized copying of national defense information with intent to injure or benefit a foreign nation". Her case was later dismissed on January 6, 2005, because of prosecutorial misconduct, but an appeal by the U.S. Attorney resulted in a plea bargain of guilty to lesser charges on December 16, 2005. She was alleged by the United States government to have contaminated twenty years of intelligence relating to the People's Republic of China, as well as critically compromising the FBI's Chinese counterintelligence program. She was known by a variety of aliases, including Chan Man Ying, Chen Wen Ying, Luo Zhongshan, and Parlor Maid.

=== Benjamin Bishop ===
In 2014, a retired U.S. Army lieutenant colonel at United States Pacific Command, Benjamin Pierce Bishop, was sentenced to seven years in prison for illegally passing classified national defense information to a Chinese spy with whom he was romantically involved.

=== Eric Swalwell ===
Beginning with his time as a Dublin, California, city councilor, Eric Swalwell was targeted by a Chinese woman believed to be a clandestine officer of China's Ministry of State Security. She also engaged with two midwestern city mayors in relationships which were of either a sexual or romantic nature.

=== Jensen Huang ===
On October 29, 2026, The New York Times reported that Jensen Huang, the co-founder and CEO of Nvidia, had been the target of a spy plot involving the government of China, citing people briefed on U.S. intelligence surveillance who spoke on condition of anonymity. Huang had an extramarital affair with Alice Huang (no relation), a Chinese national who was an executive of Megaspeed, a Singaporean company. U.S. officials reportedly suspected that she had been recruited by China's Ministry of State Security as a spy. On November 11, the Times reported, citing five Nvidia employees, that Jensen Huang had also had an extramarital relationship with Kimberly Powell, an executive who reported to him. That same day, Nvidia's board met to discuss his ouster and accepted his resignation, which the company announced the following day.

President Donald Trump was briefed on the intelligence in 2025 and in May 2026, and chose not to act. U.S. officials did not warn Jensen Huang through a defensive briefing. On November 12, Attorney General Todd Blanche said the Justice Department had reached no conclusion about whether Alice Huang was a spy, and CNN reported, citing multiple sources, that the intelligence collected on her did not prove she had acted as one. The next day, the Times reported that multiple people who had reviewed the underlying U.S. intelligence stated that they were confident in their information about her interactions with Chinese intelligence and believed she was an "asset" rather than a trained intelligence officer, and that the investigations were still ongoing. On November 16, Trump said he did not know whether she was a spy.

Singapore's Ministry of Home Affairs said there was insufficient evidence that Alice Huang had committed the suspected offenses relating to possible false declarations in server purchases, and that Singapore did not investigate her for espionage. She was issued a stern warning and barred from re-entering Singapore after police assessed that she had knowingly given them inaccurate information about her role in Megaspeed; inquiries into Megaspeed continue. The Chinese government denied involvement, dismissing the claims as "groundless speculation". Megaspeed said that Alice Huang had left the company in August 2025, and that media reports contained assertions about its business that were "not supported by verifiable evidence".

== East-Germany ==
In East Germany from the late 1960s onwards, the Ministry of State Security (Stasi) recruited call girls, nicknamed "Mielke's Maidens" after the Stasi chief Erich Mielke, to perform a number of sexpionage functions. The women met up with western diplomats and businessmen in order to compromise them, and reported back on their attitudes to East Germany. They also identified lesbians and homosexuals who might be susceptible to blackmail, as well as East Germans who were seeking to escape to the west and had made contact with western businessmen. The Stasi used specific hotels in East Germany as places for these women to take their customers. The hotels were often bugged and some had full-time Stasi employees working there.

A network of male East German spies, called "Romeos", was created by Markus Wolf, the head of East Germany's foreign intelligence service. These agents were assigned to develop long-term relationships with sources in West Germany. The sources were usually women, often secretaries in the ministries and government offices of the West German capital Bonn. Around 40 women were prosecuted for espionage in West Germany as a result of romantic relationships with undercover East German agents.

== Notable people and events ==
=== Kursk Nightingale – Russia ===
Nadezhda Plevitskaya, a former opera singer known as the "Kursk Nightingale" before the Russian Civil War, found herself living without her former luxuries following the Bolshevik Revolution. The Cheka recruited Plevitskaya through her lust for money. "Traveling throughout the white-held areas, she entertained the troops at free concerts, at the same time ingratiating herself with anti-Bolshevik leaders who had long admired the 'Kursk Nightingale.' In the process, she collected interesting intelligence from some of the more indiscreet Whites, in addition through seduction." However, Plevitskaya was captured by the Whites after intercepting some of her messages to the Cheka and ordered to be executed by firing squad. Nikolai Skoblin, then a young White cavalry officer, saw Plevitskaya refuse a blindfold before her execution. Witnessing her beauty and courage, Skoblin ordered the firing squad not to fire, after which he released her to be held in his custody. The Cheka then used Plevitskaya to recruit Skoblin, and both married (with Nadezhda's then-husband serving as best man in the wedding). Afterwards they moved to Paris, working for the Cheka among the Russian Exile Movement.

=== Cynthia – Britain ===
Amy Thorpe Pack was an American who married a senior British diplomat and began extramarital affairs upon finding her marriage passionless. She volunteered her services to MI6 while living with her husband in Warsaw in 1937. In Warsaw, she seduced a Polish Foreign Ministry Official eliciting from him Poland's plans regarding how to deal with Hitler and Stalin. Following this, she learned from another Polish official that some Polish mathematicians had started cracking the German Enigma Ciphers. Later, in Czechoslovakia, she discovered the German plans to invade Czechoslovakia. After a colorless stint of boredom at a posting in Santiago, Chile, Pack separated from her husband and went to New York City in 1941, when William Stephenson, then an MI6 chief of station, contacted her and asked her to infiltrate embassies in Washington, D.C. Realizing her motivation was a lust for danger and excitement, Stephenson gave her the code name Cynthia, after a long-lost love. Pack then seduced the chief of station for Italian military intelligence and acquired the Italian navy cipher. Beginning in early 1942, Pack posed as a pro-Vichy journalist and got Charles Brousse, the Vichy French embassy's press attaché and a Vichy politician, to fall in love with her and agree to work as an OSS asset. In a near six-hour night burglary operation, Pack and Brousse let an OSS safecracker into the embassy to carry away the Vichy code books for photographing, and at one point Pack undressed to cover for the operation by deceiving a suspicious night guard. After the operation for the Vichy codes, Pack retired from espionage because she fell in love with Brousse.

=== Commander Courtney Affair – Soviet Union ===
Commander Anthony Courtney was a "tough and opinionated former naval officer and Member of Parliament who denounced the government of the day and the Foreign Office for softness in permitting Soviet and Iron Curtain diplomats to abuse their privileges for espionage purposes." The Commander spoke fluent Russian, and in 1961 he went to bed with his Intourist guide, Zinaida Grigorievna Volkova, who was in fact a regular KGB seductress, and KGB photographers captured their intimate activity. The KGB tried to blackmail Courtney into ending his Parliamentary tirades, though he refused; and they circulated the pictures to other members of Parliament and business associates. Furthermore, Private Eye, a London satirical journal, obtained the photos and published them. Courtney lost his seat in the following election.

=== Ambassador Dejean Affair – Soviet Union ===
Maurice Dejean, the former French ambassador to the Soviet Union, was an old friend with close connections to President De Gaulle, who had a fondness for women. The KGB took advantage of this and set up Dejean first with Lydia Khovanskaya, a divorcee who spoke French, and later Larisa Kronberg-Sobolevskaya, an actress. While Dejean was with Kronberg-Sobolevskaya, her pretend husband returned home, as staged, from a geological expedition in Siberia, and beat Dejean, but allowed him to leave upon Larisa's pleading. Dejean went to a Soviet friend, who unbeknownst to him worked for the KGB, to quiet the affair. The Soviets took no immediate action, but preferred to hold their operation as leverage just in case to keep the French ambassador within their sway. Similar KGB honey traps on Dejean's wife, Marie-Claire, were unsuccessful. President De Gaulle and the French found out about the affair from British intelligence, who in turn learned of it from Yuri Krotkov, a defector. Krotkov defected in 1963 after a French Air Force attaché, Colonel Louis Guibard, shot himself when the KGB showed him pictures they took of his affair with a Russian woman and presented him with the choice of either exposure or collaboration.

=== Sir Geoffrey and Galya – Soviet Union ===
Sir Geoffrey Harrison, British Ambassador to Moscow, was the target of a KGB blackmail attempt in 1968, when they placed an attractive maid named Galya in the diplomatic mission. Sir Geoffrey fell for the honey trap, and Galya told him that pictures had been taken and that he would be exposed unless he provided information to the KGB. The scandal broke, but Sir Geoffrey had no action taken against him and he retired on full pension.

=== KGB break-in at Swedish Embassy in Moscow – Soviet Union ===
Yuri Nosenko, a Soviet defector to the West, detailed the use of a honey trap when the KGB launched a night operation to raid the Swedish Embassy in Moscow with a twelve-strong crew of safe-pickers and break-in experts. According to Nosenko, a female KGB seductress lured away the embassy's night watchman, and another agent distracted a guard dog by feeding it meat.

=== Donald Maclean – Soviet Union ===
Donald Duart Maclean was a British diplomat who spied for the Soviet Union mostly out of love for it, and he never received pay, although did get a KGB pension. However, to make sure that Maclean would not so easily double-cross the Soviets, they had Guy Burgess, another British homosexual spying for the Soviets, take photos of Maclean in bed with another man during an orgy.

=== William Vassall – Soviet Union ===
William John Vassall was an openly gay man who boasted that men said he had "come-to-bed eyes", and in 1954, as a clerk in the office of the British naval attaché, Vassall went to Moscow. A Polish clerk from the embassy brought Vassall to a party with much alcohol, and he became involved in homosexual activity. Soon, Vassall had been blackmailed and was stealing classified information for the Soviets.

== Spies mistaken as ravens ==
A male spy with a promiscuous lifestyle is not necessarily a professional raven. For example, Duško Popov was a double agent working for MI5 and feeding information to the Abwehr in World War II. He came from a moderately wealthy Yugoslavian family, and had a taste for expensive restaurants, women, and nightclubs. MI5 code-named him TRICYCLE because he was the head of a group of three double-agents. Despite being seen as an inspiration for James Bond, he was not a raven, but instead used supposed commercial connections to feed faked intelligence to the Nazis.

== Agent falling for their mission partner ==
An instance of sex or intimacy which can happen during espionage is when an agent falls for his or her partner. In one example, an Israeli "champagne spy", Wolfgang Lotz, who pretended to be a former Afrika Corps vet, covered himself deep in German social circles in Egypt prior to the Six-Day War, and fell in love with his fake "German" wife, who converted to Judaism. Lotz divorced his real wife, who was Israeli, for his partner.

== In popular culture ==
Most variations of the Black Widow in Marvel Comics are fictional characters depicted as swallows, deliberately based on the Russian program.

James Bond is a fictional character depicted as a raven; his parodical counterpart Austin Powers also uses sexpionage to elicit information. It is also suggested each of those characters was repeatedly targeted by overseas agencies with sexploitation. Examples, for James Bond, may include the (somewhat different to the film of the same name) text of Ian Fleming's 1957 novel, From Russia with Love (particularly, the character Tatiana Romanova) and the 1995 movie (with no link to Ian Fleming's book), GoldenEye (particularly, the character Xenia Onatopp).

A 1987 espionage-themed American pornographic film featuring Dana Dylan, Rachel Ashley, and Britt Morgan was titled "Sexpionage".

EVA's interactions with Naked Snake in Metal Gear Solid 3: Snake Eater align with classic sexpionage tactics, where seduction is used as a tool for intelligence gathering and manipulation. Throughout the game, she employs flirtation, physical intimacy, and emotional persuasion to gain Naked Snake’s trust while secretly working as a sleeper agent for China. Her ultimate betrayal—stealing the Philosopher’s Legacy—demonstrates that her seduction was a calculated strategy rather than genuine affection, making her a prime example of the honey trap method in espionage fiction. However she developed genuine love and loyalty for Snake, later known as Big Boss, after the events of the game and became the surrogate mother for his cloned sons Solid and Liquid for the Patriots' Les Enfants Terribles project and loved them as her own children, but left the organization out of loyalty to him.

In the 2014 film The Interview, use of a swallow is somewhat colloquially referred to as "honeypotting", and use of a raven is referred to as "honeydicking".

The 2018 film Red Sparrow shows a modern version of sexpionage.

The 2021 Indian action espionage thriller streaming television series Special Ops 1.5: The Himmat Story shows honey trapping by trained and contract based swallows.

== See also ==
- Recruitment of spies § Love, honeypots, and recruitment
- LOVEINT
- History of espionage
- Sextortion
