= Joyce Wadler =

American journalist, memoirist and reporter

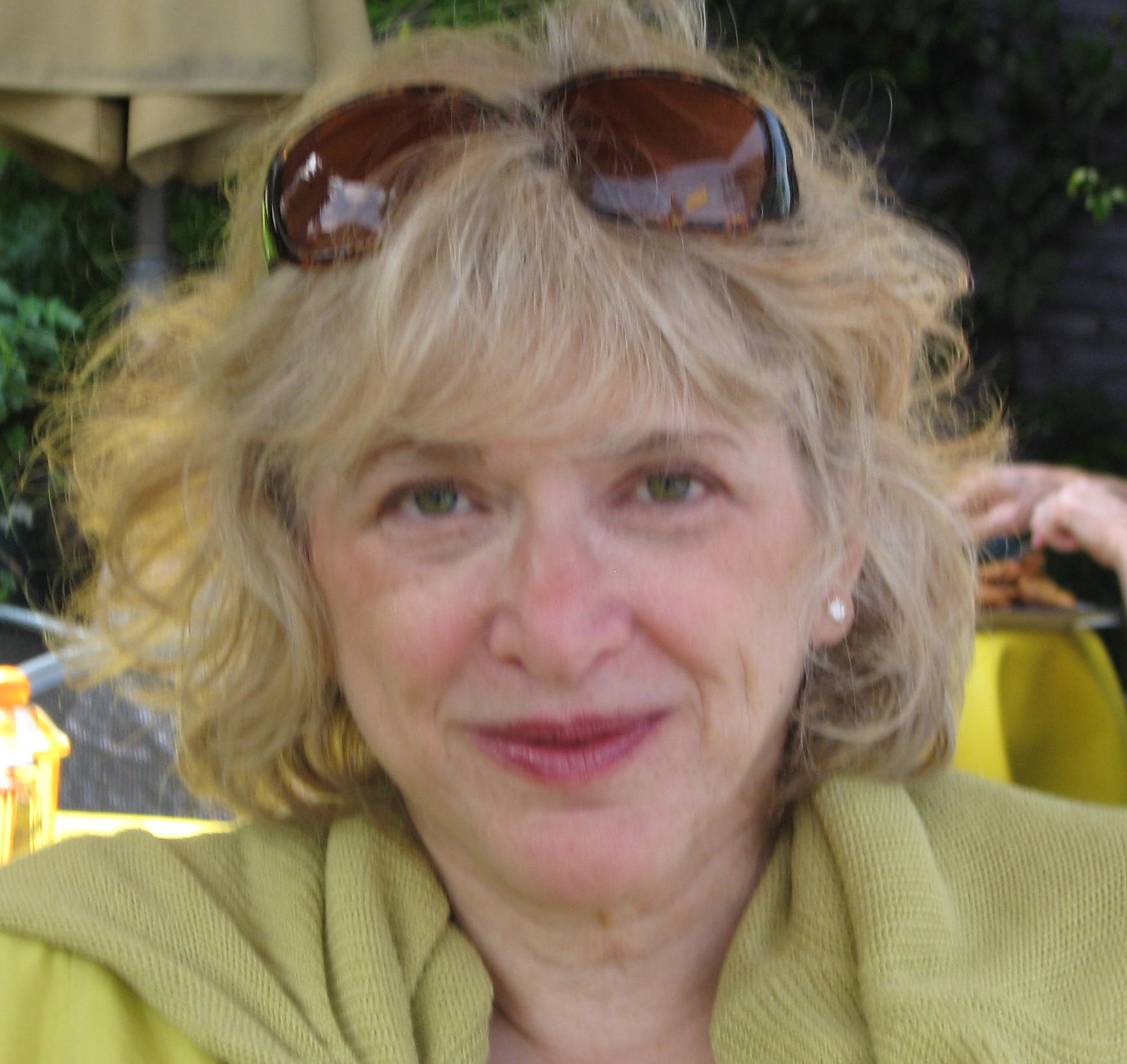
- Wadler in 2009
- Born: Joyce Judith Wadler; January 2, 1948 (age 78)
- Occupations: Journalist, reporter
- Employer: The New York Times

Joyce Judith Wadler (born January 2, 1948) is a journalist and reporter for The New York Times, as well as a writer and humorist.

== Career ==
Prior to working at the New York Times, she was a reporter and feature writer for the New York Post, New York correspondent for The Washington Post and a contributing editor for New York Magazine and Rolling Stone. She authored Liaison: The True Story of the M. Butterfly Affair (ISBN 0-553-09213-8) after interviewing Bernard Boursicot, who granted her wide access to information and insight into his affair with Shi Pei Pu.

== Cancer ==
Wadler has been treated for both breast and ovarian cancer. In 1991, Wadler was diagnosed with breast cancer and had a malignant tumor "the size of a robin's egg" removed from her left breast. The eventual diagnosis was "ductal carcinoma with medullary features". Due to somewhat early detection and aggressive treatment, Wadler called it "[m]y maybe-not- the-best-but-still-pretty-terrific-whatever-the-hell-it-is cancer".

Her memoir about breast cancer, My Breast: One Woman's Cancer Story (ISBN 0671017756; ISBN 978-0-671-01775-0) was originally a two-part cover story for New York Magazine and later expanded into an award-winning book and made into a television movie starring Meredith Baxter, which won the American Women in Radio and Television Excellence in Programming Award in 1995. In 1995, she was diagnosed with "advanced ovarian cancer" and treated. She has been in remission since 2000.

== Personal life ==
She is Jewish.

As stated in her Muck Rack profile she does not write as much as she used to, but money could still motivate her.

== Works ==
Books

- My Breast: One Woman’s Cancer Story
- Liaison: The True Story of the M. Butterfly Affair
