= Amy Elizabeth Thorpe =

British intelligence agent (1910–1963)

Amy Elizabeth "Betty" Thorpe Pack Brousse
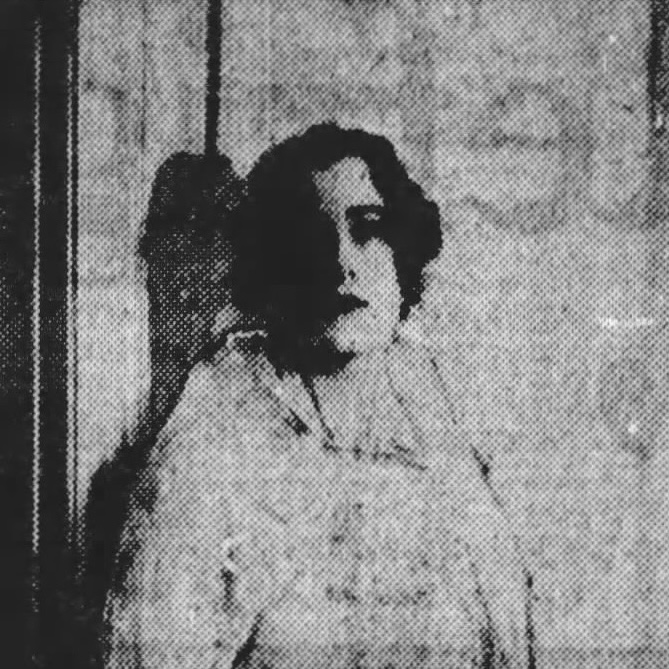
- 1930 wedding photo
- Born: Amy Elizabeth Thorpe; November 22, 1910; Minneapolis, Minnesota, U.S.
- Died: December 1, 1963 (aged 53); France, Castelnou, Pyrénées-Orientales
- Spouse(s): Arthur J. Pack, Charles Brousse
- Parent(s): George C. Thorpe & Cora Wells Thorpe
- Espionage activity
- Allegiance: Allied Powers
- Agency: BSC, MI6, OSS
- Codename: Cynthia

Amy Elizabeth Thorpe, also known as Betty Pack, Betty Thorpe, Elizabeth Pack, and Amy Brousse; (November 22, 1910 – December 1, 1963) was an Anglo-American spy, codenamed Cynthia, who worked for British Security Coordination (BSC) which was set up in New York City in 1940 during World War II by the British Secret Intelligence Service (MI6). She later worked for the American Office of Strategic Services (OSS). Her method was the sexual and romantic seduction of high-level foreign diplomats. She successfully obtained intelligence on the German Enigma machines and the Black Chamber in Poland, obtained the cipher books of fascist Italy, and stole the Vichy French naval codes out of a locked safe within an embassy. In an article published two months before her death she wrote: "in the dangerous years of Nazi aggression I looked upon myself as a soldier serving my country. No sacrifice was too great for the soldiers. I felt that, in my own way, I could do no less than they."

Her Time magazine obituary quoted William Stephenson, head of the BSC, saying that she was "the greatest unsung heroine of the war." The full story of her World War II activities cannot yet be known because some official archives as of 2016 were still "closed indefinitely" or "heavily redacted."

== Pre-war ==
Amy Elizabeth Thorpe was born on November 22, 1910, in Minneapolis, Minnesota. Her father was George C. Thorpe, a distinguished U.S. Marine Corps officer. Her mother, Cora Wells, was the daughter of a Minnesota state senator. As a child she traveled with her family from one assignment to another. Her father retired from the Marines in 1923 and after a visit to Europe (where she learned to speak French) the family settled in Washington, D.C. Thorpe was introduced at a young age by her parents to the Washington, New York City, and Newport, Rhode Island social scene. At age 14, she had her first, brief love affair with a 21-year old man in Newport. By the time Thorpe was in her late teens, she had been romantically linked to several foreign diplomats many years her senior. On April 29, 1930, Thorpe married Arthur Pack, nineteen years older and a second secretary at the British embassy in Washington. She was pregnant at the time of the marriage. Whether or not the child was Pack's is unknown. The child, a boy, was born in England on October 2, 1930. Arthur and Betty placed him in a foster home.

In 1931, Arthur and Betty Pack traveled to Chile where Arthur was assigned to the British Embassy. Betty had a daughter in Chile and converted to Catholicism. In 1935 the Packs were assigned to Spain, Arthur's first senior posting. In Spain, Betty had an affair with a Catholic priest. When the Spanish Civil War began in 1936, Betty developed a strong, and oft-expressed preference for the Nationalists of Francisco Franco rather than the Republicans. With the Civil War raging, Pack, a Nationalist supporter but accused of being a Republican spy, traveled around the country at great danger, searching for (and eventually finding) her priest-lover and becoming involved in humanitarian relief activities. She had an affair with a British diplomat in Valencia.

In 1937, the Packs were assigned to the embassy in Warsaw, Poland. Arthur shortly had a stroke and Betty took him back to England to recover, then returned to Warsaw with her daughter. While in Warsaw in 1938, she had an affair with a young, politically-active Pole named Edward Kulikowski. Nazi Germany had just annexed Austria, and Kulikowski told her (accurately) that Czechoslovakia would be Hitler's next target and that Poland was conspiring to take a piece of Czechoslovakia as its own. She passed that information along to Jack Shelley, the Secret Intelligence Service's agent in Poland, and he recruited her as an SIS agent. Later that year she had an affair with an even better informed Pole, Micah Lubienski, and reported their pillow talk to Shelley. She may have reported on the Polish success in breaking the Enigma code of Nazi Germany. Her activities, however, came to the attention of the Polish Foreign Minister and she was ordered to leave the country which she did on September 27, 1938. On April 7, 1939, the Pack family departed Europe for another posting in Chile where Arthur's job was a step down from his jobs in Europe.

Pack was described by author Lovell as "beautiful, slightly above medium height and slim with amber blond hair, patrician features and large green eyes." Of her personality, Lovell said that "Women did not stay attracted [to her] very long. Most men stayed too long."

== World War II ==
World War II began on September 1, 1939. The Pack family was in Chile. Betty, using the pseudonym of "Elizabeth Thomas" wrote anti-Nazi articles for local newspapers, probably at the instigation of Embassy intelligence officers. She obtained a job in the United States with the highly-secret British Security Coordination (BSC), a sub-agency of the British Secret Intelligence Service (MI6). William Stephenson headed the BSC. Pack arrived in New York on November 25, 1940, leaving her estranged husband and daughter behind in Chile. She had not seen her son in the foster home in England for several years.

Pack was investigated prior to her employment by a young American Naval Intelligence agent named Paul Fairly. The two had an affair and she became pregnant and had an abortion.

Pack was ordered by BSC to rent a fashionable house in Washington, DC and resume her former life mingling in Washington society. Her first major job was to persuade two prominent U.S. senators to support Lend-Lease legislation to provide military assistance to the beleaguered British forces. Senators Thomas Connally and Arthur Vandenberg were opposed to Lend Lease. Pack's attempts to influence Connally failed, but after several encounters of Vandenberg with Pack, he voted in favor of Lend-Lease in March 1941 and the legislation was adopted. What means Pack used to try to persuade him—and whether she was important in changing his mind—are unknown.

=== Italian ciphers ===
Pack's next major job was to obtain the Italian naval ciphers. The United States was still a neutral in World War II and Italy had an embassy in Washington. The British needed the codes to read the Italian navy messages and gain an advantage in warfare in the Mediterranean Sea. As a teenager, Pack had been friendly (and possibly romantically involved) with an Italian naval officer named Alberto Lais, 28 years older than her. In 1941 Lais was an Admiral and the Italian Naval Attache in Washington. Pack rekindled their relationship, which was apparently sensual and romantic but not sexual. Lais declined to give her the naval ciphers but gave her the name of the cipher clerk in the Italian Embassy who had access to the ciphers. She met the clerk, posing as a reporter interested in writing a story about him. After several interviews, she persuaded him to give her the naval ciphers in exchange for a small amount of money. The naval ciphers enabled the British to decode Italian messages and may have helped them win a decisive encounter with the Italian navy at the Battle of Cape Matapan on March 28, 1941.

In 1967, however, the Admiral's heirs sued British author, H. Montgomery Hyde, in an Italian court for defamation, insisting that Hyde's claim that Lais (who had died in 1951) betrayed military secrets was false. In 1988, Lais' two sons protested publication of the seduction account in David Brinkley's best-selling Washington Goes to War and persuaded the Italian defense ministry to publish denial ads in three leading East Coast newspapers.

An alternate story is that the Italian Naval Enigma message leading to the Italian defeat at the Battle of Cape Matapan was broken at the Government Code and Cypher School, Bletchley Park, using Dilly's rodding method without a codebook. This debunks Hyde's opinion that the codebook Pack obtained from the cipher clerk was a factor in the Italian defeat.

=== Vichy ciphers ===
Germany defeated France in 1940. The armistice agreement permitted a collaborationist French state called Vichy to remain unoccupied by the German military and retain some characteristics of independence, such as an embassy in Washington, D.C.. Pack was now working for both the BSC and the American Office of Strategic Services (OSS). Pack was given the job of penetrating the Vichy embassy. Posing as a pro-Vichy journalist, Pack made an appointment to see the press attaché, a much married World War I fighter ace named Charles Emmanuel Brousse and quickly seduced him. Two months into their affair, in July 1941, Brousse's position at the Embassy was eliminated and he was offered a lesser position at one-half the salary. Pack offered him money for collaboration appealing to his desire for a restored France freed from German control. Brousse accepted and began passing secret documents to Pack.

In March 1942, Pack was given what seemed the impossible task of obtaining the Vichy naval code books from the Embassy. The code books were locked up in a safe to which Brousse did not have access. After several false starts, Pack made friends with the night guard of the Embassy. Brousse and she then bribed the night guard to allow their access to the Embassy at night to have sex. One night, the three of them shared a drink and they drugged the guard. While he was asleep, they smuggled a safe-cracker into the Embassy and he discovered the combination of the safe. However, time was too short to take, copy, and return the cipher books. A few days later, on 24 June, 1942, Brousse and Pack returned to the Embassy at night ostensibly to have sex again. When the guard made his rounds, he found them both naked (a deliberate ploy for credibility by Pack), apologized for his intrusion, and left them alone for the remainder of the night. The safecracker climbed a ladder into the Embassy, opened the safe, took the cipher books away to be photographed, and returned them to the vault before daybreak. Pack and Brousse then departed the embassy as happy lovers.

The cipher books enabled the OSS to decipher the Vichy navy's communications. The intelligence gleaned from the Vichy intercepts helped the Americans succeed in the invasion of Vichy North Africa in November 1942.

=== FBI Surveillance ===
Throughout her work in Washington, Pack was under surveillance by the FBI as she was suspected of being a foreign agent which in fact she was, working for the British BSC as well as the American OSS. An FBI memo of August 20, 1942, also mentions that the Military Intelligence Service had an interest in her "fishy" activities. Affirmations from the British and American spy agencies that Pack was an agent of theirs did not halt the FBI's interest in monitoring her activities.

== Later life ==
Pack wanted to go to France as an OSS or British agent, but she was too well known in the world of espionage by this time and had little meaningful to do for the rest of World War II. She spent an hour with President Franklin Roosevelt drinking martinis and telling him of her adventures. Along with Brousse, she journeyed to France in 1944 after it was liberated from German control. Pack is reported to have later said about her sexually-active war years:

Ashamed? Not in the least, my superiors told me that the results of my work saved thousands of British and American lives.... It involved me in situations from which 'respectable' women draw back – but mine was total commitment. Wars are not won by respectable methods.

After her estranged husband, Arthur Pack, killed himself in 1945, Pack married Charles Brousse. The couple lived quietly in France in the Château de Castelnou, a medieval castle in the commune of Castelnou (Catalan: Castellnou dels Aspres) in the French département of Pyrénées-Orientales, until her death from throat cancer on December 1, 1963. In her last few months of life she began writing a memoir which was used by Hyde in a 1966 biography of her titled Cynthia, her World War II codename. Brousse died in 1972 in a fire at their Château. In excerpts from her memoirs that were published in a newspaper in 1963 Elizabeth reported that her first child, Anthony—who had been raised by a country doctor and his wife in England—was killed in combat during the Korean War. Her daughter, Denise, was "happily married in America."

== See also ==
- William Stephenson
- British Security Coordination
- Vichy France
- Sexpionage
