= Karl Koecher =

Czechoslovak spy (born 1934)

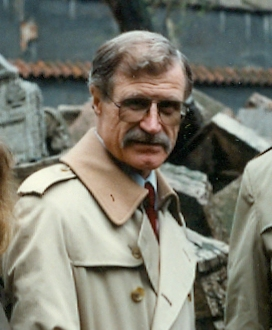
- Koecher, Prague, 1987
- Born: 21 September 1934 (age 92); Bratislava, Czechoslovakia
- Education: Charles University (M.S., 1957); Indiana University; Columbia University (Ph.D., 1971) (Note: Zbigniew Brzezinski was one of his professors.)
- Spouse: Hana Koecher
- Espionage activity
- Allegiance: Czechoslovakia; Soviet Union
- Agency: StB; KGB
- Service years: 1962–1983
- Codename: Pedro, Tulian, Rino

Karel František Köcher, usually referred simply as Karel Köcher, sometimes written as Karl Koecher (born 21 September 1934) is a Czechoslovak mole known to have penetrated the CIA during the Cold War.

== Early life ==
Born in Bratislava, Czechoslovakia, his father was a Viennese-born Czech and his mother Irena, a Slovak Jew. As the son of an Anglophile, Koecher gained his language skills from an early age attending an English grammar school and later French lyceum before the war. Prior to his entry to university, his anti-state activities in his teen years attracted the attention of the Czechoslovakia State Security after the Communists took over in Czechoslovakia in 1948.

As remembered by some of his classmates, from early age he showed strong analytical capabilities, high intelligence and individualistic nature. Due to his unlikeable character, in later years, his former classmates would not invite him on annual class meetings. He studied physics and mathematics at Charles University as well as film at the Academy of Performing Arts.

After university he tried a few jobs including a teacher, a reporter for state television, and a radio comedy writer. He became a radio comedy writer and was allegedly frequently scrutinized by the Communist security forces for his satire that mocked the regime (this turned out to be a pre-planned "cover story"). He joined the Communist Party in 1960, and the Czechoslovak intelligence service in 1962 using the codename Pedro.

== Czechoslovakia State Security (StB) career ==
Koecher claimed that constant harassment from the Czechoslovakia State Security (StB) due to his history of anti-state and anti-social behavior, ruined his different careers and in order to end the harassment, he decided to join the StB. With the help of a friend within the StB and his language skills, he was recruited into the intelligence service.

Koecher's first two years were devoted to training and counter-intelligence work against West Germans in Prague.

Koecher was selected to become a mole in the West working with the first directorate in the StB because of his English language skills.

Immigration to the United States

In 1965 he and his wife, Hana Koecher (the daughter of a Communist Party official), seemingly emigrated to the United States via Austria posing as defecting dissidents.

His language skills and status as a defector aided Koecher in gaining employment at Radio Free Europe and a year long fellowship at Indiana University.

He returned to New York in 1967 and he gained a doctorate in philosophy from Columbia University, and became an American citizen in 1971.

CIA work

With the purge of his superiors at the StB during the aftermath of the 1968 Soviet Union led invasion of Czechoslovakia, he found himself out of touch with the service and approached the FBI instead in an attempt to defect and use his knowledge against the Soviets but they were not interested.

His supply of information to the StB dwindled from 1969 until 1971, but he continued to integrate himself in American society.

Taking a CIA prescreening employment exam in November 1972, he passed and was employed. After several years as a sleeper he was hired by the CIA as a translator/analyst in 1973 due to his fake dissident credentials and skills in a number of Eastern European languages. He was given high-level security clearance and given the job of translating and analyzing documents handed over by CIA agents and transcripts of wiretaps and bugs.

During the 1970s, both he, who was known as a virulent anti-communist in the United States, and his wife Hana, whose codename was 'Adrid', allegedly frequented nudist beaches in New Jersey and New York City swingers clubs, such as Plato's Retreat and the Hellfire Club, and were members of the Washington, D.C., based swingers network 'Capital Couples' which often met at The Exchange restaurant that was only two blocks from the White House. Many of these sex parties included other senior CIA employees as well as FBI and senior Department of Defense employees. The Koechers were experts at sexpionage.

He quickly became one of the USSR's best sources of information, allowing them to mount an effective defense against CIA covert actions. He translated documents from a key CIA asset in Moscow, Ogorodnik. According to Martha D. Peterson, a retired CIA officer, Koecher is believed to have betrayed Aleksandr Dmitrievich Ogorodnik, a Soviet diplomat who spied for the CIA. (Note: Ogorodnik's CIA case officer, Aldrich Ames, had given Ogorodnik the codename Trigon.)

KGB death threat and CIA retirement

In September 1976, however, Koecher was summoned back to Prague to a meeting with KGB head of counter-intelligence, Oleg Kalugin. Kalugin claims that after interrogating Koecher, he discovered that Koecher was in fact a triple agent and that his information could not be trusted. According to Koecher, the StB then ordered Koecher to resign from the CIA or face death.

After seven days of interrogation, Koecher returned to New York and retired, leaving the CIA for a post in academia, teaching philosophy.

Reactivation

By 1982, Koecher was rehabilitated by the KGB after Kalugin was demoted from chief of foreign counterintelligence and Koecher's past intelligence had been reassessed. In the 1980s, Koecher was one of a number of agents reactivated, when he was approached by the StB intelligence officer Jan Fila, operating out of the UN, in New York. (Note: Many believe that Fila was working for the United States.) He returned to work part-time for the CIA. Although the FBI asserts that they had been monitoring and surveilling Koecher and his wife from the early 1980s, it was at least three years before he was arrested.

To this day, neither the FBI nor the CIA will reveal what alerted them to Koecher's treachery. Koecher and other KGB officials claim it was Kalugin. Another suggestion, by a CIA historian, is that it was the StB intelligence officer, Jan Fila, who betrayed him with the latter disappearing in December 1989, a month after the Czechoslovak Velvet Revolution.

== Apprehension ==
The FBI apprehended Koecher on 27 November 1984, outside New York City's Barbizon Plaza Hotel, and brought him and, soon afterwards, his wife Hana in for several days of questioning. Finally, Koecher agreed to become a triple agent working for the Americans, provided that they agreed to grant him immunity from prosecution. This was done and Koecher attempted to convince the FBI that he was cooperating.

However, it was then decided that Koecher was not reliable enough to be a triple agent and was likely to defect and return to Czechoslovakia. On 27 November 1984, the day after the couple sold their apartment and hours before they were scheduled to fly to Switzerland, Koecher and his wife were arrested in New York City. Koecher was held on espionage charges and Hana Koecher as a material witness. The arrest of the two agents was released to the media. U.S. Attorney Rudolph Giuliani led the case. The case on his wife, Hana, a purported diamond merchant but actually a courier for the StB from 1974 to 1983, had been bungled and would not result in a conviction, so the prosecutors allowed her to gain immunity in return for information against her husband Karl Koecher.

It soon emerged that the FBI had badly blundered. Koecher's confession was given only after his interrogators promised him immunity as a ruse, and was thus invalid. His wife had been denied access to a lawyer despite frequent requests for one, which reportedly caused Justice Department officials to refuse to charge her. She refused to testify against Karl, asserting spousal privilege, though prosecutors argued this did not apply given the two had been partners in crime. With little concrete evidence, it appeared that Koecher had a good chance of being acquitted. The issue of whether or not Hana Koecher could be compelled to testify against her husband went before the US Supreme Court but the fact that both spouses were returned to Czechoslovakia in a prisoner exchange before the court's opinion was published rendered the case moot. According to Koecher, Rudy Giuliani, as a prosecutor for the Southern District of New York, had bungled the case and was unable to gain enough evidence to convict Koecher after Koecher's arrest and instead offered immunity to Koecher in exchange for more information.

Koecher was the victim of an attempted stabbing by an unnamed inmate while in prison. The inmate supposedly lunged at Koecher with a pair of scissors in an attack Koecher said was foiled by a Hells Angels member, Sandy Alexander. Koecher claims the inmate was moved to another prison, and could not be located years later, which he says is proof of an attempt by US intelligence agencies to assassinate him.

Koecher, worrying about his own safety, sent through his lawyer and his spouse's father, a request to the KGB chairman that he be part of a prisoner exchange with the Soviets. KGB chairman Kryuchkov agreed, and so did the prosecutor's office, concerned about the embarrassing chance of an acquittal. (Note: According to Koecher, the United States prosecutor for the Southern District of New York, Rudy Giuliani, who had ambitions to become a mayor of New York City, did not want an acquittal because it would hurt Giuliani politically.) Koecher pleaded guilty on charges of conspiracy to commit espionage for Czechoslovakia, and was sentenced to life in prison, which was reduced to time served provided he left the US and never returned. On 11 February 1986, Koecher and his wife were part of a nine-person exchange at Glienicke Bridge in Berlin, of which the most prominent member was noted dissident Anatoly Shcharansky.

== Return ==
Koecher returned to Czechoslovakia to a hero's welcome and was given a house and a Volvo car as a reward for his services. He was also given a job at the Prague Institute for Economic Forecasting, where many future politicians worked; Václav Klaus and Miloš Zeman, the future Czech presidents, were among them. Some U.S. journalists stated they had seen Koecher issuing orders at the Laterna Magika theatre during the early days of the Velvet Revolution (1989). Koecher denied any involvement in the Velvet Revolution, saying that journalists must have mixed him up with the then unknown Václav Klaus, who had a similar appearance.

The fall of communism has seen Koecher fall from prominence, with the exception of his alleged involvement in a scheme run by Oswald LeWinter, (Note: During their United States incarceration in the 1980s, Oswald LeWinter and Karl Koecher were only a few cells apart from each other and maintained a relationship.) a self-professed former CIA operative, to defraud Mohammed Al-Fayed with false documents that would support his conspiracy theories about the death of Princess Diana. He continues to live in the Czech Republic in relative obscurity. His wife, Hana Koecher, made the headlines in the Czech Republic, when she was fired from her new job as a translator for the British Embassy in Prague. The British were completely unaware of her espionage past until a Czech newspaper reporter notified them. A suit she filed against a media organisation for revealing her past as a spy, damaging her business, was rejected.

== Film ==
An episode of the 2004 Canadian documentary series Betrayal! and the Czech feature documentary Rino (2015) covere the Koecher case.

== See also ==
- Larry Wu-Tai Chin
- Sexpionage
- Wolfgang Vogel
- Paul Rosbaud

== Bibliography ==
- Benjamin Cunningham: The Liar: How a Double Agent in the CIA Became the Cold War's Last Honest Man, August 23, 2022, ISBN 978-1541700796.
- Ronald Kessler: The CIA At War: Inside The Secret Campaign Against Terror, 2004, ISBN 0-312-31933-9.
- Ronald Kessler: The Bureau: The Secret History of the FBI, 2003, ISBN 0-312-98977-6.
- Ronald Kessler: The FBI: Inside the World's Most Powerful Law Enforcement Agency, 1994, ISBN 0-671-78658-X.
- Ronald Kessler: Inside the CIA, 1994, ISBN 0-671-73458-X.
- Ronald Kessler: Escape from the CIA: How the CIA Won and Lost the Most Important KGB Spy Ever to Defect to the U.S., 1991, ISBN 0-671-72664-1.
- Ronald Kessler: The Spy In The Russian Club, 1990, ISBN 978-0-684-19116-4.
- Ronald Kessler: Spy Vs Spy: Stalking Soviet Spies in America, 1988, ISBN 0-7153-9337-5.
