= M. Butterfly (film) =

1993 American romantic drama film

- Theatrical release poster
- Directed by: David Cronenberg
- Screenplay by: David Henry Hwang
- Based on: M. Butterfly by David Henry Hwang
- Produced by: Gabriella Martinelli
- Starring: Jeremy Irons; John Lone; Barbara Sukowa; Ian Richardson
- Cinematography: Peter Suschitzky
- Edited by: Ronald Sanders
- Music by: Howard Shore
- Production company: Geffen Pictures
- Distributed by: Warner Bros.
- Release date: October 1, 1993
- Running time: 101 minutes
- Country: United States
- Language: English
- Budget: $17–18 million
- Box office: $1.5 million

M. Butterfly is a 1993 American romantic drama film directed by David Cronenberg and written by David Henry Hwang based on his 1988 play. The film stars Jeremy Irons and John Lone, with Ian Richardson, Barbara Sukowa, and Annabel Leventon. The story is loosely based on true events which involved French diplomat Bernard Boursicot and Chinese opera singer Shi Pei Pu.

== Plot ==
In 1964, René Gallimard is an accountant assigned to the French Embassy in Beijing, where he is accompanied by his wife. With Frau Baden, an embassy wife, he attends a performance of excerpts from Madama Butterfly, and is captivated by the performance of the singer, Song Liling, despite being unacquainted with the opera. After the performance, he speaks with Song, who pointedly critiques René's romantic attachment to the opera's orientalist themes and implores him to "continue his education" at a performance of Peking Opera, which is Song's specialty. Soon, René attends a performance featuring Song, meets her backstage, and accompanies her home. Song presents as female to René, who is apparently unaware (or willfully ignorant) of the fact Song is, in fact, a man who performs Dan roles. René is entertained by Song at her home, but breaks off contact for some time despite Song's entreaties.

At the embassy, René's fastidiousness wins him no friends among the rank-and-file. However, it is noted by the ambassador, who appoints him vice-consul to reorganize the embassy's intelligence-gathering operations, particularly as American activity in Vietnam increases. René visits Song again, and asks if Song is "his Butterfly". Song coyly admits she is, and performs oral sex on René; however, she declines to undress, citing supposed oriental standards of modesty. Their romance continues, heavily tinged by René's orientalist perception of Song as his "young, innocent, schoolgirl", and Song's indulgence of that perception. As their sexual contact intensifies, Song insists on staying dressed during it for supposed cultural reasons.

René begins sharing details of his Vietnam-related intelligence work with Song, who passes it along to her handler, Comrade Chin. Comrade Chin is nonetheless perturbed by Song's insistence on presenting as female even when René is not there; Song replies that she "hates the costume" but is willing to perfect it for the sake of the revolution. At an embassy party, René gets drunk and is propositioned by a nude Frau Baden; he instead storms off to Song and demands that she undress. Song deflects by saying that she is pregnant, and must leave for her home village in accordance with Chinese tradition. After leaving, she solicits a baby boy of plausible Eurasian appearance from her handler. Meanwhile, René witnesses Peking opera costumes being burned by Red Guards as the Cultural Revolution intensifies. Later, Song returns to René with the baby boy. Overjoyed. René proposes marriage, but before Song can answer, she is removed by Red Guards. René is soon fired from his job for his incompetent analysis of the situation in Vietnam (presumably influenced by Song's deception) and sent back to Paris; meanwhile, Song is sent to a reeducation camp for being a bourgeois artist.

In 1968, back in Paris and working as a diplomatic courier, René is moved to tears by a performance of Madama Butterfly at the Opéra Garnier and witnesses protests by Maoist student radicals. One day, Song reappears at his austere apartment. Later, René is arrested by the DGSI. At René's trial in 1970, Song appears with his hair cut short and dressed as a man. Song details his and René's relationship to the incredulous court, and states that, after his return to Paris, he convinced René to share documents with him to protect the safety of their "son" in China. As they are driven away from the trial in a police van, Song finally undresses for René and reminds René that he is the same person who René fell in love with in China. René angrily rebuffs Song's sexual advances, saying that he loved a lie.

In prison, René, in Butterfly drag, delivers a tragic monologue to his fellow prisoners, first relating his shameful story and then confessing that he still dreams of an oriental woman willing to sacrifice herself for an imperfect western man. Concluding that he has finally found her, and that he is Madame Butterfly, he slits his throat in front of the audience as "Un bel dì, vedremo" plays. Meanwhile, Song, extradited, boards a plane bound for China.

== Cast ==
- Jeremy Irons as René Gallimard
- John Lone as Song Liling
- Ian Richardson as Ambassador Toulon
- Barbara Sukowa as Jeanne Gallimard
- Annabel Leventon as Frau Baden
- Shizuko Hoshi as Comrade Chin
- Vernon Dobtcheff as Agent Etancelin

== Production ==
David Henry Hwang's play M. Butterfly, based on the relationship between Bernard Boursicot and Shi Pei Pu, opened on Broadway in 1988, and was critically and financially successful. David Geffen, the play's producer, retained the film rights through his company. He worked with Warner Bros. on the film and was given a budget of $17–18 million.

Cronenberg stated that "Ironically, if there was ever a film of mine that you could call a sellout, it was M. Butterfly." He read the film script written by Hwang before seeing the play for the first time. Geffen initially wanted Peter Weir to direct the film, but Weir declined. It was the most expensive film directed by Cronenberg until A History of Violence.

Cronenberg had parts of the script, such as Americans in Vietnam and bombing scenes, removed as he was uninterested in it. The first draft of the script featured Gallimard watching the Madama Butterfly opera with his mother as a child. The ending scene between Gallimard and Liling in the police van was created by Cronenberg as he "just knew that it wouldn't play in prison the way it was in the play" as he felt Liling being allowed in Gallimard's cell and stripping would be unbelievable.

Cronenberg auditioned over sixty men for the role of Liling before selecting John Lone. The costume design was done by Cronenberg's sister Denise 5,979 costumes were used in the film. Hairstyling was done by Aldo Signoretti. Randy Balsmeyer and Mimi Everett designed the title sequence, which features CGI created using Softimage 3D, and purchased around $30,000 worth of antique kimonos for it. It was their first title sequence to be fully computer generated.

The film was mostly filmed in Toronto and was also shot in Beijing, Budapest, and Paris from August to December 1992. It was Cronenberg's first film to be shot outside of Canada. Geffen and Warner Bros. were impressed by the first trailer and the grand scale despite its small budget according to Cronenberg as "for 17 million dollars we got a fucking 50 million dollar epic". Cronenberg was unable to accept the Genie Awards he won for Naked Lunch in person as he was filming in Hungary.

== Release ==
M. Butterfly premiered as the gala opening film at the 1993 Toronto International Film Festival on September 9, 1993. Cronenberg was the first director to have two of their films shown as the festival's opening film, with Dead Ringers opening the festival in 1988. It was released on LaserDisc on March 30, 1994.

The film was a commercial failure and grossed $1,498,795 in the domestic box office. It earned $57,280 in its domestic opening weekend. Cronenberg stated that he was disappointed by the film's reception and felt that it was overshadowed by The Crying Game. He said that the films paralleled each other as both were transsexual, transracial, and transcultural.

== Reception ==
On review aggregator website Rotten Tomatoes, the film holds an approval rating of 39%, based on 23 reviews, and an average rating of 5.60/10. The website's critics consensus reads: "David Cronenberg reins in his provocative sensibility and handles delicate material with restraint, yielding a disappointing adaptation that flattens M. Butterfly into a tedious soap opera." On Metacritic, the film has a weighted average score of 43 out of 100, based on 19 critics, indicating "mixed or average reviews".

Marshall Fine gave the film two stars and wrote that "it's hard to know where Hwang and Cronenberg went wrong in translating this film from stage to screen" and "it lacks the power, the ambition and the drama of the play". Craig MacInnis, writing in the Toronto Star, wrote that "Against all odds, M. Butterfly is a boring film", Robert Feldberg, writing in The Record, wrote that it was "remarkably boring" in his 1½ star review, and Kenneth Turan, in the Los Angeles Times, wrote that the "Dazzling and multicolored" play was "turned into a drab moth of a film". Gene Siskel gave the film 2½ stars stating that it was a "disappointing treatment of the hit play" and that it failed "because it is impossible to believe that Irons' character can't figure out that this womanly figure is really a man".

Jami Bernard praised Irons and Lone's acting in her 3½ star review. Eleanor O'Sullivan, writing a 2½ star review in Asbury Park Press, criticized Irons as being miscast and that Gallimard should have had a previous gay relationship as it would have "given real force to his resolution to believe the man he loves is a woman". Rene Rodriguez, writing in the Miami Herald, also criticized the performances in his two star review stating that Irons "doesn't seem to be all here" compared to his "terrific dual performance" in Dead Ringers and Lone was not believable as a woman.

Noel Taylor, writing in the Ottawa Citizen, gave the film four stars. Jay Boyar wrote that there was "not a single unearned tear in this M. Butterfly" in his four star review in the Orlando Sentinel. Roger Ebert gave the film 2½ stars and a thumbs up, but criticized that it "does not take hold the way the stage play did" and the two ending scenes "fly so recklessly in the face of plausibility that we're distracted".

== See also ==
- Cross-dressing in film and television

== Works cited ==
- Abrams, Janet (1994). "Beginnings, Endings And The Stuff In Between". Sight and Sound. Vol. 4, no. 12. British Film Institute.
- Cronenberg, David (2006). David Cronenberg: Interviews with Serge Grünberg. Plexus Publishing. ISBN 0859653765.
- Mathijs, Ernest (2008). The Cinema of David Cronenberg: From Baron of Blood to Cultural Hero. Wallflower Press. ISBN 9781905674657.
- Rodley, Chris, ed. (1997). Cronenberg on Cronenberg. Faber and Faber. ISBN 0571191371.
