= Red Sparrow =

2018 film by Francis Lawrence

- Theatrical release poster
- Directed by: Francis Lawrence
- Screenplay by: Justin Haythe
- Based on: Red Sparrow by Jason Matthews
- Produced by: Peter Chernin; David Ready; Jenno Topping; Steven Zaillian
- Starring: Jennifer Lawrence; Joel Edgerton; Matthias Schoenaerts; Charlotte Rampling; Mary-Louise Parker; Jeremy Irons; Ciarán Hinds
- Cinematography: Jo Willems
- Edited by: Alan Edward Bell
- Music by: James Newton Howard
- Production company: Chernin Entertainment
- Distributed by: 20th Century Fox
- Release dates: February 15, 2018 (Newseum); March 2, 2018 (United States)
- Running time: 140 minutes
- Country: United States
- Languages: English; Russian
- Budget: $69 million
- Box office: $151.6 million

Red Sparrow is a 2018 American spy thriller film directed by Francis Lawrence and written by Justin Haythe, based on the 2013 novel of the same name by Jason Matthews. The film stars Jennifer Lawrence, Joel Edgerton, Matthias Schoenaerts, Charlotte Rampling, Mary-Louise Parker, Jeremy Irons, and Ciarán Hinds. It tells the story of a former-ballerina-turned-Russian intelligence officer, who is sent to make contact with a CIA officer in the hope of discovering the identity of a mole.

Matthews, a former member of the CIA, advised the production on the depiction of spying. Based on historic Soviet sexpionage and contemporary Russian use of kompromat, filming took place in Hungary, Slovakia and Austria.

Red Sparrow premiered at the Newseum in Washington, D.C., on February 15, 2018, and was released in the United States on March 2, 2018. The film grossed $151 million worldwide, and received mixed reviews from critics, who described it as having "more style than substance" and criticized the film's long runtime and over-reliance on graphic violence and sex, although Lawrence's performance was praised.

== Plot ==
In modern-day Russia, famous ballerina Dominika Egorova supports her infirm mother. Her career abruptly ends after her dance partner injures her during a performance. After the Bolshoi cuts her off, Dominika's Uncle Ivan, the deputy director of the SVR, reveals that her ex-partner, Konstantin, and a rival dancer, Sonya, who were lovers, deliberately injured her. Dominika seeks retribution by ambushing them in the Bolshoi showers and beating them with her cane, injuring both. To avoid prosecution and receive financial support, she agrees to help Ivan. She is tasked with seducing Dimitri Ustinov, a Russian gangster, in exchange for her mother's continued medical care.

Meeting at a bar, the two go to her private hotel room, where Dimitri rapes her but is quickly interrupted and garroted by Sergei Matorin, an SVR operative authorized by Ivan. They flee to a safehouse and Ivan offers Dominika a choice: become an SVR operative, or be executed for witnessing Ustinov's assassination.

Nate Nash is a CIA operative working in Moscow. While meeting with a Russian mole code-named Marble in Gorky Park, they are confronted by the police. Nash creates a diversion to ensure his contact escapes unidentified while reaching the U.S. Embassy. Nash is reassigned to the U.S. but insists he is the only person Marble will work with. Since he cannot return to Russia, he is assigned to Budapest to reestablish contact with Marble, which the SVR also deduce.

Dominika is sent to State School 4, a brutal specialist training school for "Sparrows"—operatives capable of seducing their targets with sexpionage— where she's given the alias, Katya, and revealing her true identity and profession is forbidden. She excels in her training, despite some friction with her trainer, 'the Matron'. Against Matron's recommendation, Ivan and General Vladimir Korchnoi, a high-ranking official, decide that Dominika is ready for an assignment in Budapest—to gain Nash's trust and expose Marble's identity.

In Budapest, Dominika lives with fellow "sparrow" Marta, and is supervised by station chief Maxim Volontov. She makes contact with Nash, who quickly determines she is a Russian intelligence operative and attempts to convince her to defect.

Dominika inspects Marta's room and finds she has been assigned to buy classified intelligence from Stephanie Boucher, chief of staff to a U.S. Senator. When Ivan pressures her about her slow progress with Nash, Dominika claims to be helping Marta with Boucher as well.

Marta is brutally killed by Sergei Matorin after Dominika told her about the earlier incident with Ustinov. Dominika is then warned by Sergei that the same fate would befall her should she open her mouth about that again. She contacts Nash, agrees to become a double agent in exchange for protection for her and her mother, and has sex with him. Under Russian orders, Dominika travels to London with Volontov to meet Boucher and complete the trade, but covertly switches out the intelligence she supplies with CIA-supplied disinformation.

After the meeting, Boucher realizes that she is being observed by American intelligence agents, panics, then backs into traffic and is killed. Russian agents observing her realize their mission has been compromised. Suspected of tipping off the Americans, Dominika and Volontov are recalled to Moscow where they are tortured and interrogated for days.

Volontov is executed, but Dominika's claims of innocence are eventually believed by Ivan. She is allowed to return to Budapest to continue her mission of extracting Marble's identity from Nash. Instead, she convinces Nash to relocate her and her mother to America.

After spending the night with Nash, Dominika awakes to find him being tortured by Matorin for Marble's identity. She initially assists until Matorin lowers his guard and she kills him, but is badly injured while doing so. She awakes in a hospital where Korchnoi reveals himself as Marble. He explains that he was patriotic, but became disillusioned when a bureaucrat he had once offended refused to allow an American doctor to operate on his sick wife. Korchnoi fears he will be caught soon so, instead of dying in vain, instructs Dominika to expose his identity to Ivan. Doing so would make her a national hero, and allow her to replace him as a mole passing intelligence to the CIA.

When Dominika contacts her superiors, she frames Ivan as the mole, using evidence she had been fabricating since she first arrived in Hungary, and blaming him for the botched exchange in London. Ivan is killed by a sniper during a prisoner exchange while Nate goes along with her plan to confirm the mole's identity, and Dominika is honored in a military ceremony after she returns to Russia, with Korchnoi present at the ceremony.

Back in Russia, Dominika lives once again with her mother. She is now free to enjoy watching a ballet performance at the Bolshoi from the balcony, but leaves just before the end of the closing act. The film ends with her receiving a phone call from an unknown person who plays Grieg's piano concerto, which she had previously told Nash was the piece for her first solo performance. She smiles.

== Cast ==
- Jennifer Lawrence as Dominika Egorova, a former prima ballerina who is now a "Sparrow"
- Joel Edgerton as Nate Nash, a CIA operative
- Matthias Schoenaerts as Ivan Vladimirovich Egorov, Dominika’s uncle and Deputy Director of the SVR
- Charlotte Rampling as Matron, the Headmistress of Sparrow School
- Mary-Louise Parker as Stephanie Boucher, a US Senator's Chief of Staff
- Ciarán Hinds as Colonel Zakharov, Director of the SVR
- Joely Richardson as Nina Egorova, Dominika’s ailing mother
- Bill Camp as Marty Gable, Nash's supervisor
- Jeremy Irons as General Vladimir Andreievich Korchnoi, a high-ranking SVR officer who was revealed to be the CIA mole codenamed "Marble"
- Thekla Reuten as Marta Yelenova, a veteran Sparrow
- Douglas Hodge as Colonel Maxim Volontov, SVR Budapest Section Chief
- Sakina Jaffrey as Trish Forsyth, CIA Station Commander
- Sergei Polunin as Konstantin, Dominika's former dance partner
- Nicole O'Neal as Sonya, a rival ballerina and Konstantin's lover
- Sasha Frolova as Anya, friend of Dominika and classmate at the Sparrow school
- Sebastian Hülk as Sergei Matorin, a Russian operative and torture expert
- Kristof Konrad as Dimitri Ustinov, a Russian gangster who presents himself as a patron of arts
- Hugh Quarshie as Simon Benford, CIA officer

== Production ==
=== Development ===
After Jason Matthews' book Red Sparrow was published in 2013, 20th Century Fox purchased the film rights, and signed Francis Lawrence to direct. Matthews said the idea of "sparrows" and a "sparrow school" was based on State School 4 in the Soviet Union, though Russian "sexpionage" is now done by women contracted outside of spy agencies. The Russian concept of kompromat was also influential. Francis worked on adapting Matthews' book in 2015, and has said that at the time, he had reservations about the timelines of a Cold War story.

Screenwriter Justin Haythe reduced the number of narrators and shifting perspectives in the novel, concentrating on Dominika. Russian President Vladimir Putin, who appears in the novel, was also cut from the adaptation, due to Francis Lawrence's belief that it would be a distraction to have an actor play the highly public figure.

Matthews, who said he based his book on his experiences in the CIA, was also hired as technical advisor, to supervise the accuracy of the depiction of espionage. He had the Gorky Park scene rewritten to depict espionage methods more accurately.

=== Casting ===
Francis Lawrence presented the screenplay to Jennifer Lawrence, who accepted the part. She stated she admired the character and his direction, with her sole point of hesitation being the "really sexual" nature of the character. They met to discuss the nude scenes. In 2014, Jennifer Lawrence had private nude photos stolen in the iCloud leaks. However, she drew a distinction between the film and the leak based on her consent to the film, as opposed to the leak. Lawrence explained: "The insecurity and fear of being judged for getting nude, what I went through, should that dictate decisions I make for the rest of my life?"

Matthews advised Lawrence that double agents from Russia feel "a dread of discovery, a dread of being arrested, a dread of going to prison." The role also required Lawrence to study ballet for four months. Kurt Froman of the New York City Ballet was brought in to coach her for a minimum of four hours each day for five days per week. American Ballet Theatre principal dancer Isabella Boylston acted as Lawrence's dance double.

As a former member of the CIA, Matthews coached actor Joel Edgerton. Edgerton said it was difficult to consider having "an interpersonal dating-style relationship ... [and] That fact that you would have to report any of those kinds of interactions with your bosses." Matthias Schoenaerts and Jeremy Irons joined the cast by December 2016.

=== Filming ===
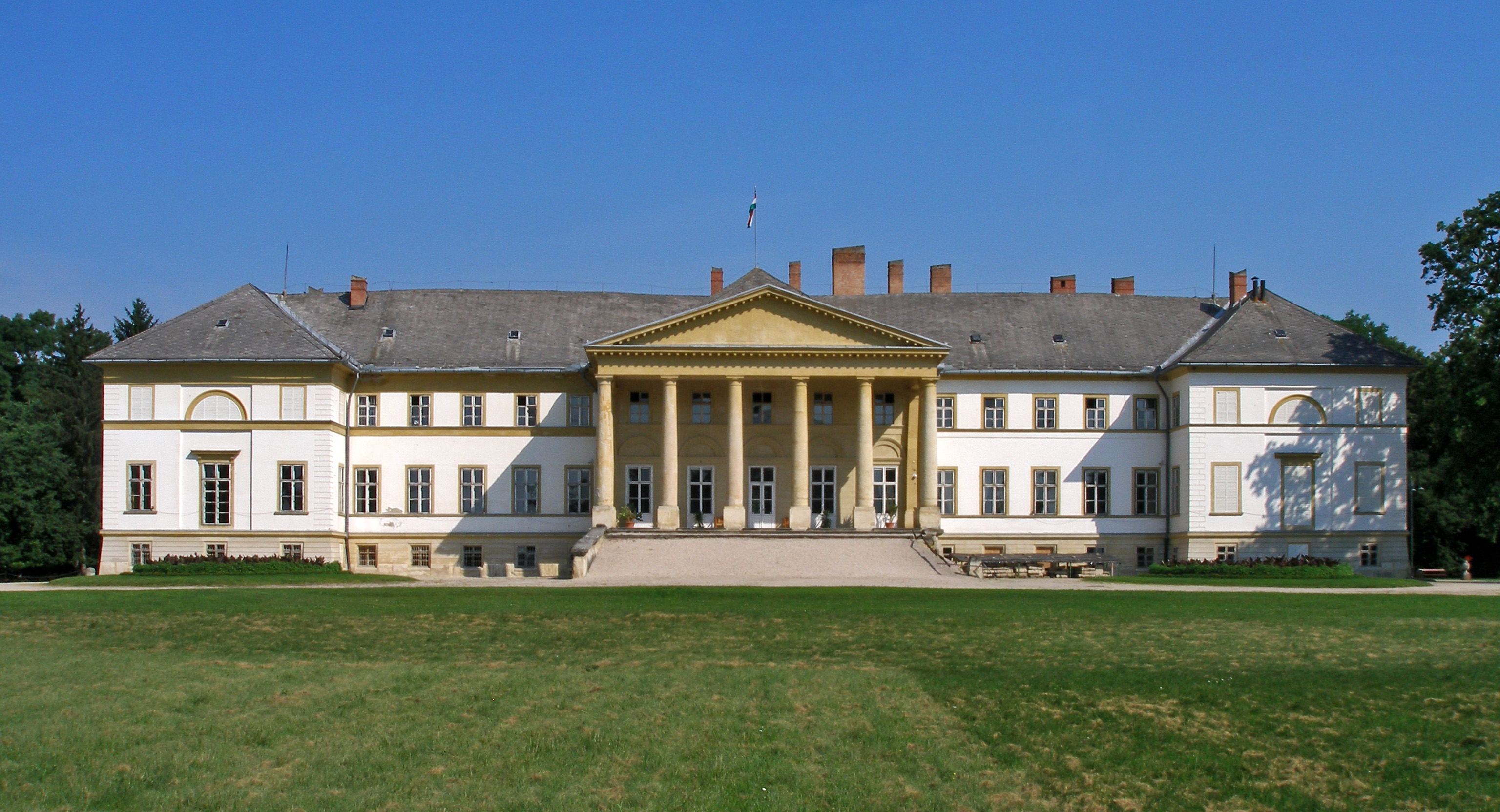
Festetics Mansion in Dég

Principal photography started in Budapest and Dunaújváros in Hungary on January 5, 2017. Other filming locations include Festetics Mansion in Dég, Hungary; Bratislava, Slovakia and Vienna, Austria.

=== Post-production ===
In post-production, Francis Lawrence offered Jennifer Lawrence the opportunity to view a cut of the film ahead of the studio and producers, so that she might request the deletion of any nude or sexual scenes. She declined to request any deletions. However, the film was edited for the United Kingdom release to remove a garroting and secure a 15 certificate from the British Board of Film Classification.

2. Adagio
Grieg's piano concerto

For the soundtrack, the 1868 Piano Concerto by Edvard Grieg was used. James Newton Howard wrote the score, recorded in October 2017, citing Wolfgang Amadeus Mozart's Requiem and Igor Stravinsky's The Firebird as influences. He commenced work before seeing a cut of the film.

== Release ==
The film was originally scheduled to be released by 20th Century Fox on November 10, 2017, but in April 2017 it was announced that the film's release would be pushed back to March 2, 2018, because it was seen as a less competitive one. The studio's adaptation of Murder on the Orient Express was moved into Red Sparrow's November slot. The first trailer for the film was released on September 14, 2017. The film premiered on February 15, 2018, at the Newseum, and began a U.S. theatrical release on March 2.

Red Sparrow screened at FEST in Belgrade on February 28, 2018. It was released in the United Kingdom on March 1, 2018.

=== Home media ===
Red Sparrow was released on digital streaming platforms on May 15, 2018. It was released on 4K UHD Blu-ray, Blu-ray and DVD on May 22, 2018.

== Reception ==
=== Box office ===
Red Sparrow grossed $46.8 million in the United States and Canada, and $104.7 million in other territories, for a worldwide total of $151.5 million, against a production budget of $69 million.

In the United States and Canada, Red Sparrow was released alongside Death Wish, and was projected to gross $20–24 million from 3,056 theaters in its opening weekend. It made $6 million on its first day (including $1.2 million from Thursday night previews) and $17 million over the weekend, finishing second, behind holdover Black Panther. Deadline Hollywood noted the opening was underwhelming given the film's $69 million budget, and that Lawrence's salary of $15–20 million was too much to spend on one star. It fell 51% in its second weekend to $8.15 million, finishing fourth. In the United Kingdom, the film was second at the box office in its opening weekend after Black Panther, and went on to gross £6.4 million.

=== Critical response ===
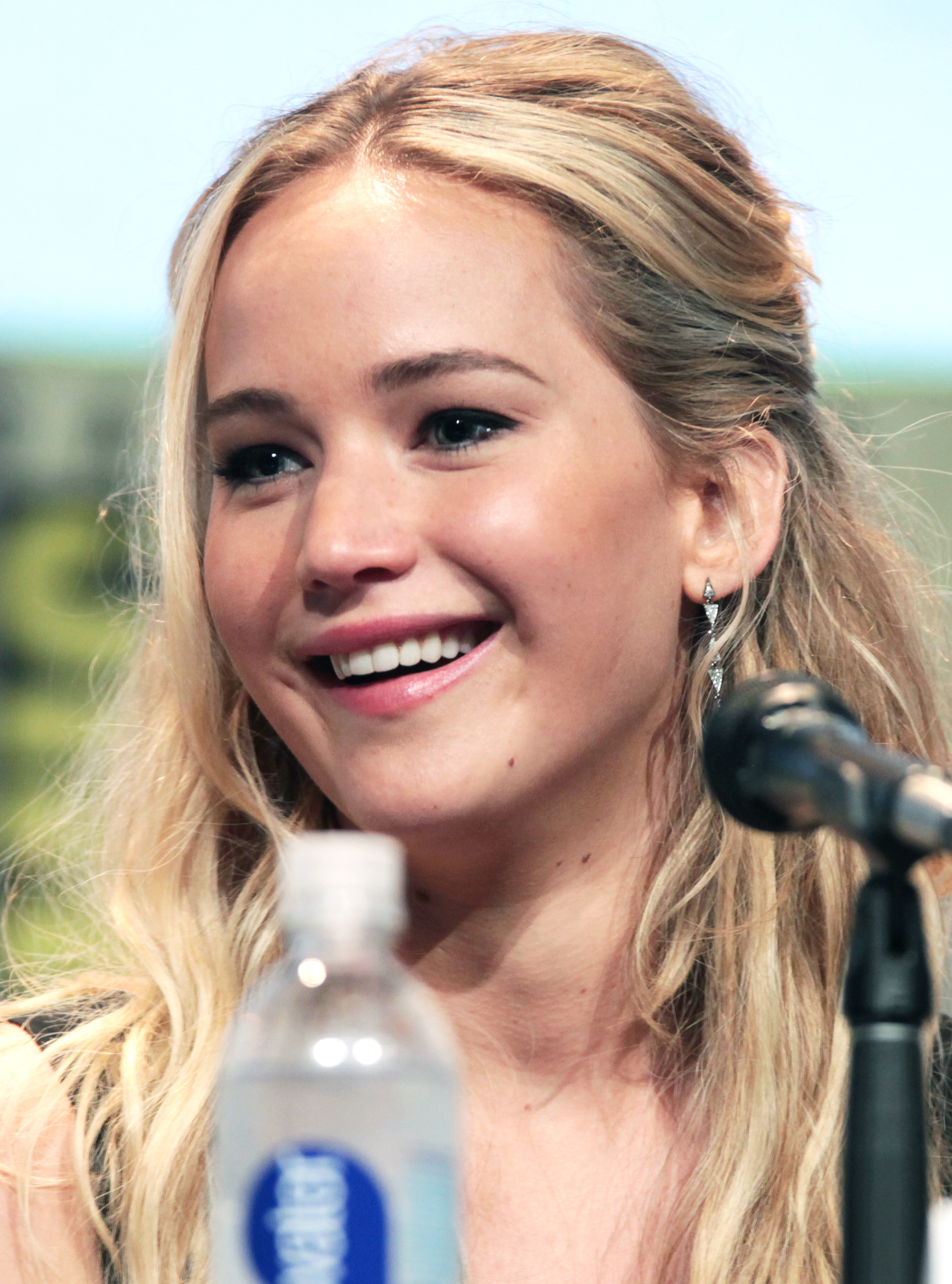
Jennifer Lawrence's performance was praised by critics.

On review aggregator website Rotten Tomatoes, the film has an approval rating of 45%, based on 300 reviews, and an average rating of 5.5/10. The website's critical consensus reads, "Red Sparrow aims for smart, sexy spy thriller territory, but Jennifer Lawrence's committed performance isn't enough to compensate for thin characters and a convoluted story." On Metacritic, the film has a weighted average score of 53 out of 100, based on 51 critics, indicating "mixed or average reviews". Audiences polled by CinemaScore gave the film an average grade of "B" on an A+ to F scale.

Manohla Dargis of The New York Times found the film to be "preposterously entertaining" and credited its success to Lawrence's performance, writing that "like all great stars, [Lawrence] can slip into a role as if sliding into another skin, unburdened by hesitation or self-doubt." IndieWire's Eric Kohn, who graded the film a B, noted the performances of Lawrence and Rampling, stating that "the considerable talent on display is [the film's] constant saving grace." However, he also found that the film "doesn't know when to stop, sagging into bland torture scenes and an underwhelming final showdown." Giving the film a B−, The A.V. Club's Jesse Hassenger noted its methodical nature, with its minimal action and character exploration, and remarked that Francis Lawrence "brings to this material what he brought to The Hunger Games: a sense of style that feels constrained by obligations to hit a certain number of plot points."

Alonso Duralde of TheWrap criticized the derivative story and the lack of chemistry between Lawrence and Edgerton, calling the film "neither intelligent enough to be involving nor fun enough to be trashy." Michael Phillips of the Chicago Tribune gave the film 1.5 out of 4 stars and said, "Half of the Red Sparrow audience will spend at least part of the running time fighting off memories of Salt and Atomic Blonde and the Black Widow storyline from The Avengers. The other half, meantime, will wonder when spy movies became quite so punishing." Simran Hans of The Guardian found the film to be sexist, writing that "it busies itself with the grim surface pleasures of ogling its central character as she is degraded in every way possible." Emily Gaudette of Newsweek called the film a "sadistic torture porn" and went on to ask "how many naked women need to be assaulted in a film before a director has made his point? ... for Francis Lawrence, the answer is a pile so big it's impossible to tell the victims apart."

The estimation reported by Russian publications was lower than the global average. According to Megacritic, the average score was 4.7 out of 10 based on more than 30 reviews.

== Accolades ==
Award	Date of ceremony	Category	Recipient(s)	Result	Ref.
Alliance of Women Film Journalists	January 10, 2019	Actress Most in Need of a New Agent	Jennifer Lawrence	Won	
Alliance of Women Film Journalists	January 10, 2019	Most Egregious Age Difference Between the Leading Man and the Love Interest	Jennifer Lawrence, Joel Edgerton	Nominated	
Alliance of Women Film Journalists	January 10, 2019	Hall of Shame		Nominated	
Costume Designers Guild	February 19, 2019	Excellence in Contemporary Film	Trish Summerville	Nominated	
Golden Trailer Awards	May 31, 2018	Best Teaser	"Program", 20th Century Fox, Wild Card	Nominated	
Hollywood Post Alliance	November 15, 2018	Outstanding Color Grading – Feature Film	Dave Hussey	Nominated	
People's Choice Awards	November 11, 2018	Drama Movie of 2018		Nominated	
People's Choice Awards	November 11, 2018	Drama Movie Star of 2018	Jennifer Lawrence	Nominated	

== Historical accuracy ==
According to The Daily Telegraph, "The espionage historian Nigel West — whose Historical Dictionary of Sexspionage (Scarecrow Press) was originally written as a handbook for the intelligence community — questions the existence of such training schools".

== Proposed sequel ==
In 2018, director Francis Lawrence expressed interest in a sequel based on either Palace of Treason or The Kremlin's Candidate.
