= George C. Thorpe =

United States Marine Corps officer and writer (1875–1936)

George Cyrus Thorpe
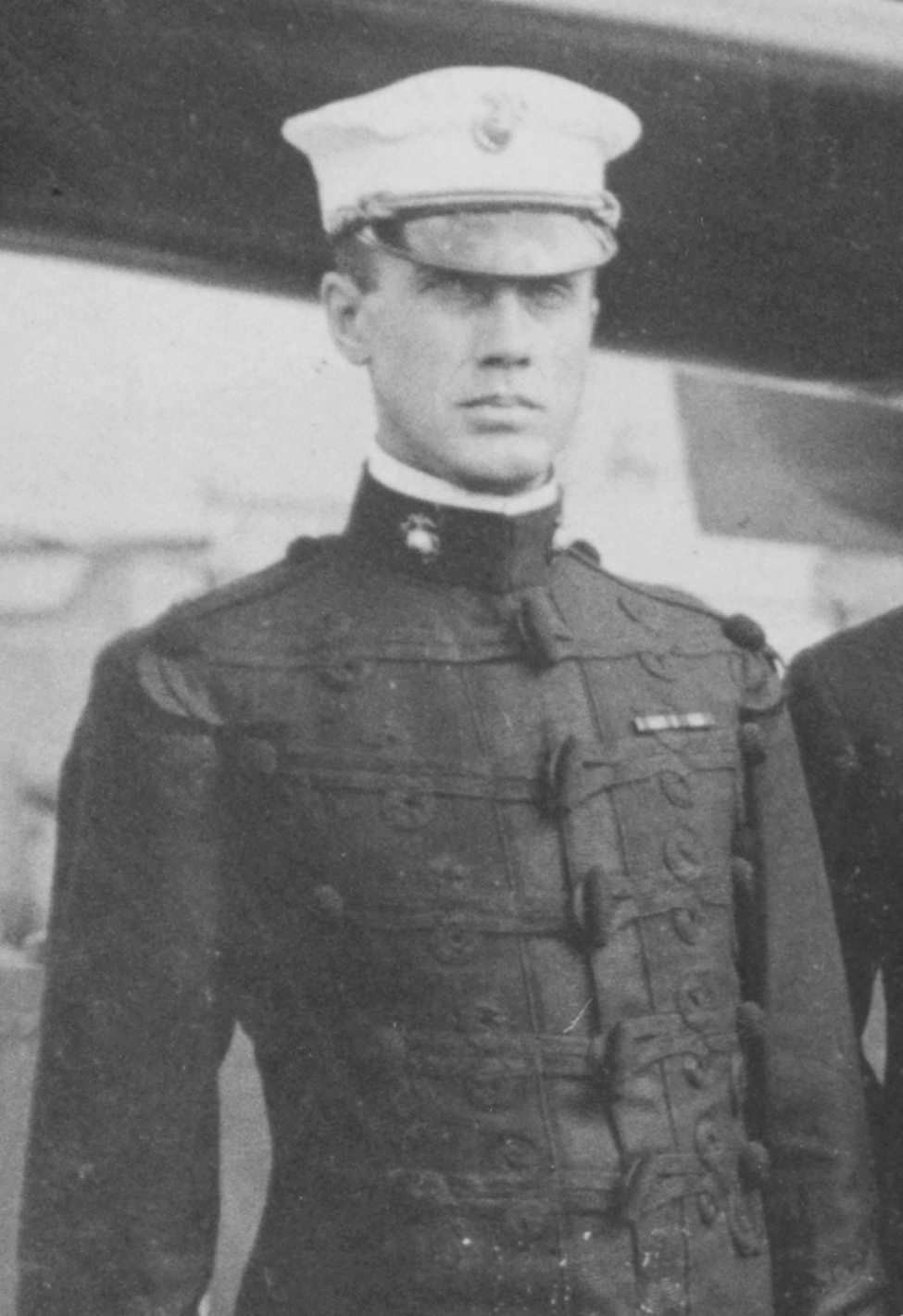
- Thorpe aboard the USS Tennessee, c. 1909
- Born: January 7, 1875; Northfield, Minnesota, U.S.
- Died: July 28, 1936 (aged 61); Bethesda, Maryland, U.S.
- Burial place: Arlington National Cemetery
- Relatives: Amy Elizabeth Thorpe, daughter
- Military career
- Allegiance: United States
- Branch: United States Marine Corps
- Service years: 1898–1923
- Rank: Colonel
- Units: 1917–1918, Chief of Staff, 2nd Marine Brigade
- Commands: 1903, Marine guard for U.S. diplomatic mission to Emperor Menelik II of Ethiopia; 14 Mar 1911, 3rd Marines; 28 May 1917 – 19 Oct 1917, 3rd Marines; 17 Dec 1917 – 1 Feb 1918, 3rd Marines; Portsmouth Naval Prison; Marine Barracks, Pearl Harbor
- Conflicts: Spanish–American War; Philippine–American War; Negro Rebellion
- Awards: Marine Corps Brevet Medal; Order of the Star of Ethiopia
- Other work: Author, lawyer

George Cyrus Thorpe (January 7, 1875 – July 28, 1936) was a United States Marine Corps officer during the Spanish–American War and the Philippine–American War. He was an early writer on military logistics. He was one of 23 Marine Corps officers awarded the Marine Corps Brevet Medal for bravery. He was also an author and lawyer after he retired from the Marine Corps.

== Biography ==
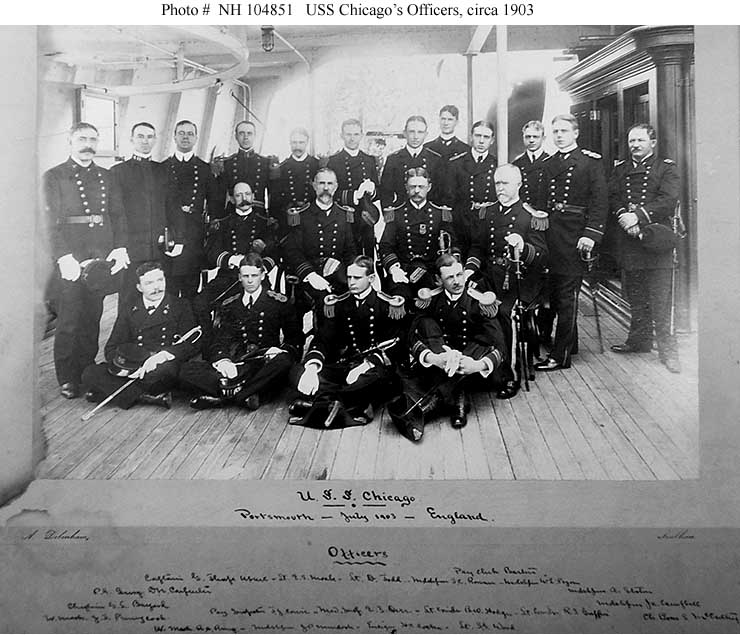
Thorpe as a captain, standing fourth from the left in the back row in this photograph of the officers of the protected cruiser USS Chicago, c. 1903.

Thorpe was born January 7, 1875, in Northfield, Minnesota, and in 1894 received an appointment to the United States Naval Academy in Annapolis, Maryland.

He resigned in November 1896 but when the Spanish–American War started he applied for a commission in the Marine Corps and was appointed a Second Lieutenant.

In 1903–1904, Captain Thorpe commanded the Marine guard of the American diplomatic mission to Abyssinia, and photographed the emperor Menelik II.

He married Cora Wells of Minnesota, and the marriage produced daughter Amy Elizabeth Thorpe, who became an American spy, codenamed "Cynthia", who worked for William Stephenson during World War II, director of British Security Coordination, a cover organization in New York City set up by British Secret Intelligence Service (MI6) in 1940.

While serving in the Marine Corps he earned his Bachelor of Science from New York University in 1910. In 1912 he served in Cuba during U.S. intervention in the Negro Rebellion. Thorpe also graduated from the Naval War College in 1915 before serving on its staff, earned a Master of Arts from Brown University in 1916, and completed the General Staff College in 1921.

He was a Major when he was assigned to the Marine Barracks, Washington, D.C., in 1917.

In 1922 or 1923 he was found not physically qualified for further service because several toes from both feet had been amputated. He was placed on the retired list as a colonel.

After retiring from the Marine Corps he became a lawyer and author, writing several books on legal subjects. He had previously written on military matters.

George Thorpe died July 28, 1936, at Bethesda Naval Hospital in Bethesda, Maryland, and is buried at Arlington National Cemetery. He married Cora Edna Wells, on April 8, 1908, the daughter of a Minnesota senator. They had had three children; the eldest, Amy Elizabeth Thorpe, was a successful World War II spy.

=== Presidential citation ===
Citation

The President of the United States takes pleasure in presenting the Marine Corps Brevet Medal to George Cyrus Thorpe, First Lieutenant, U.S. Marine Corps, for distinguished conduct and public service in the presence of the enemy at Novaleta, Philippine Islands. On 28 March 1901, appointed Captain, by brevet, from 8 October 1899.

=== Secretary of the Navy citation ===
Citation

The Secretary of the Navy takes pleasure in transmitting to First Lieutenant George Cyrus Thorpe, United States Marine Corps, the Brevet Medal which is awarded in accordance with Marine Corps Order No. 26 (1921), for distinguished conduct and public service in the presence of the enemy while serving with the Second Battalion of Marines, at Novaleta, Philippine Islands, on 8 October 1899. On 28 March 1901, First Lieutenant Thorpe is appointed Captain, by brevet, to rank from 8 October 1899.

== Works ==
- Military
  - Thorpe, George C. Pure Logistics: The Science of War Preparation (Kansas City, MO: Franklin Hudson Pub. Co., 1917) (multiple formats at Google; US access only, page images at HathiTrust) At the Federal Depository Library Program Electronic Collection Archive of the US Government Publishing Office.
  - Thorpe, George C. (1919). Recruit Manual. Philadelphia and London: J.B. Lippincott company. LCCN 19005873. OCLC 3719304. (page images at HathiTrust)
- Law
  - Thorpe, George C. Federal Departmental Organization and Practice (Kansas City, Vernon law book co.; St. Paul, West publishing co., 1925) (page images at HathiTrust)
  - Thorpe, George Cyrus. National and State Prohibition under Eighteenth Amendment: Including Industrial Liquor Regulations, Digest of Cases, Forms and Words and Phrases, Peculiar to the Liquor Industry, Judicially Defined (1926)
  - Thorpe, George Cyrus. Prohibition Digest: Statutory References and Digest of Decisions of the Courts of the United States Relating to Intoxicating Liquor (1926)
  - Thorpe, George C.; Ellis, Challan B. (1933). The Federal Securities Act Manual: A Treatise Based on the Federal Securities Act of 1933 and the Corporation of Foreign Bondholders Act, 1933, with Forms, Rules and Regulations. Cincinnati: W.H. Anderson Co. LCCN 33023822. (page images at HathiTrust)
  - Thorpe, George C. "Contracts payable in gold", showing the legal effect of agreements to pay in gold (Document / 73d Congress, 1st session, Senate). (1933)
