= Castelnou, Pyrénées-Orientales =

Castelnou Castellnou dels Aspres (Catalan)
- Commune
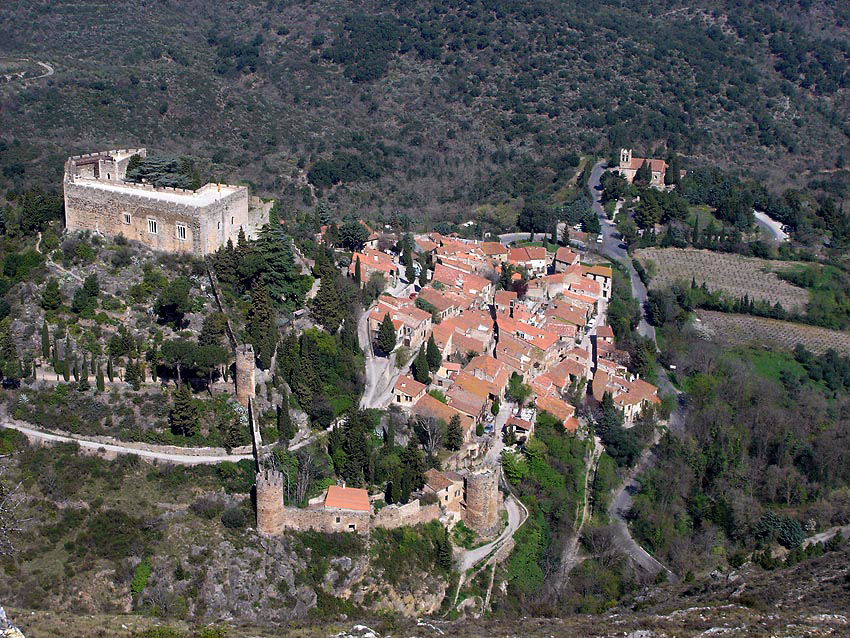
- View of Castelnou and its castle

- Coat of arms
- Location of Castelnou
- Location within France Location within Occitanie
- Coordinates: 42°37′14″N 2°42′11″E
- Country: France
- Region: Occitania
- Department: Pyrénées-Orientales
- Arrondissement: Céret
- Canton: Les Aspres
- Intercommunality: Aspres

Government
  - Mayor (2020–2026): Michel Huge
- Area^{1}: 19.28 km^{2} (7.44 sq mi)
- Highest elevation: 444 m (1,457 ft)
- Lowest elevation: 111 m (364 ft)
- Population (2023): 280
  - Density: 15/km^{2} (38/sq mi)
- Demonym(s): castelnouvois (fr) castellnoví (ca)
- Time zone: UTC+01:00 (CET)
  - Summer (DST): UTC+02:00 (CEST)
- INSEE/Postal code: 66044 /66300
- ^{1} French Land Register data, which excludes lakes, ponds, glaciers > 1 km^{2} (0.386 sq mi or 247 acres) and river estuaries.

Castelnou (French pronunciation: [kastɛlnu]; Catalan: Castellnou dels Aspres [kəsˌteʎˈnɔw dəɫs aspɾəs]) is a commune in the Pyrénées-Orientales department in southern France.

== Geography ==
=== Localisation ===
Castelnou is located in the canton of Les Aspres and in the arrondissement of Perpignan.

It is part of the Northern Catalan comarca of Rosselló. It is located within the subcomarca of Aspres, with the northern area of the commune being part of Riberal de la Tet.

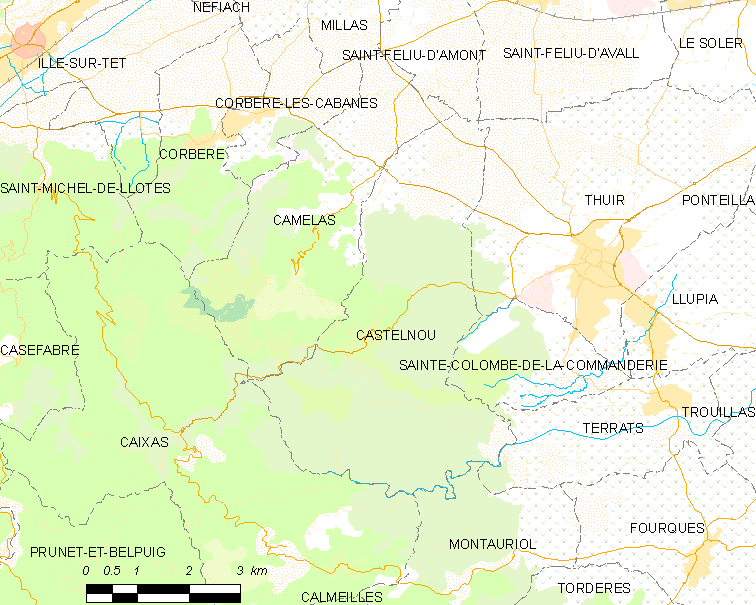
Map of Castelnou and its surrounding communes

== Population ==
Historical population
Year	Pop.	±% p.a.
1968	173	—
1975	159	−1.20%
1982	152	−0.64%
1990	277	+7.79%
1999	331	+2.00%
2007	365	+1.23%
2012	350	−0.84%
2017	315	−2.09%
2023	280	−1.94%
Source: INSEE

== Sites of interest ==
- Château de Castelnou : the medieval castle.
- The old village, labelled as Plus Beaux Villages de France.
- The church of Sainte-Marie du Mercadal, from the 13th century.
- The tower of Castelnou, a former watch tower.

== Gallery ==
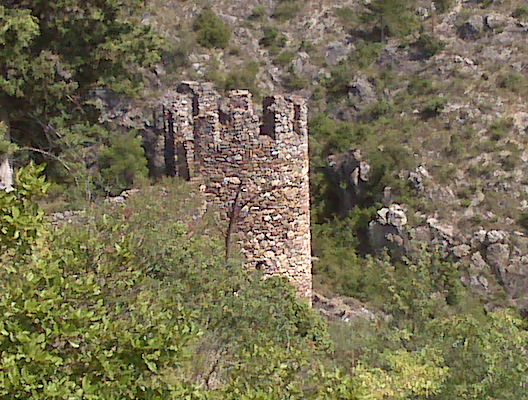
A tower of the castle

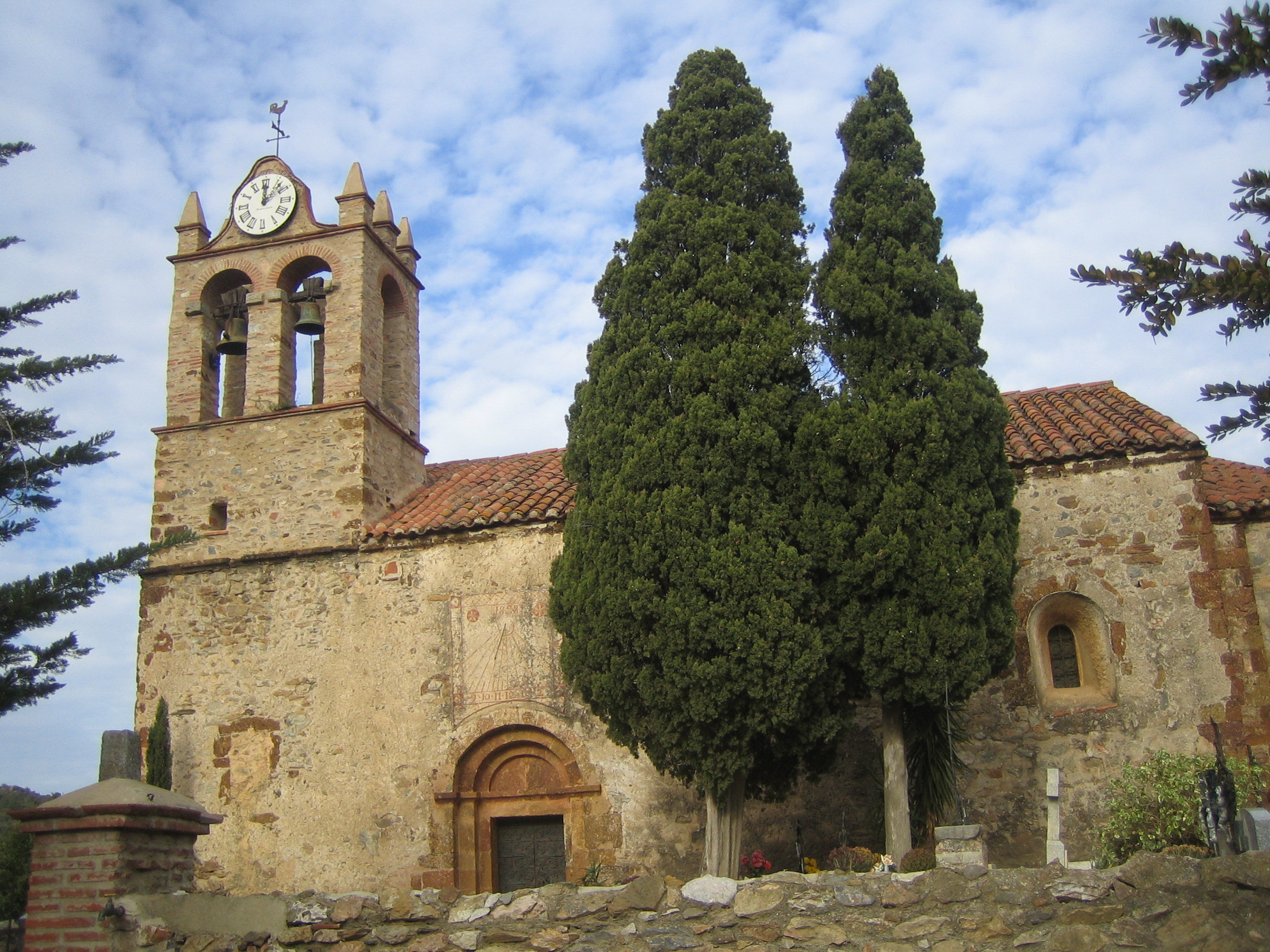
The church of Sainte-Marie du Mercadal

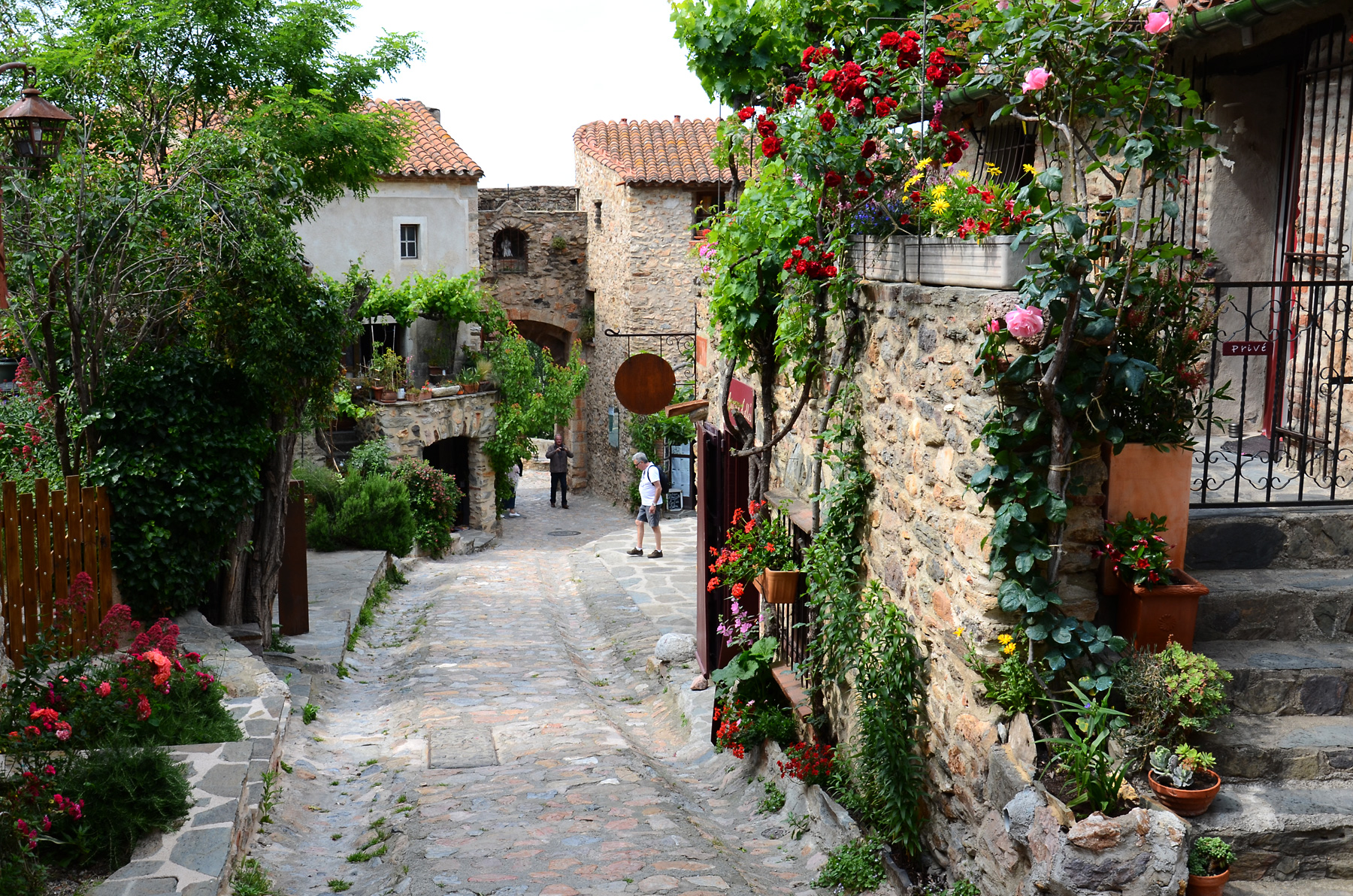
A street in the village

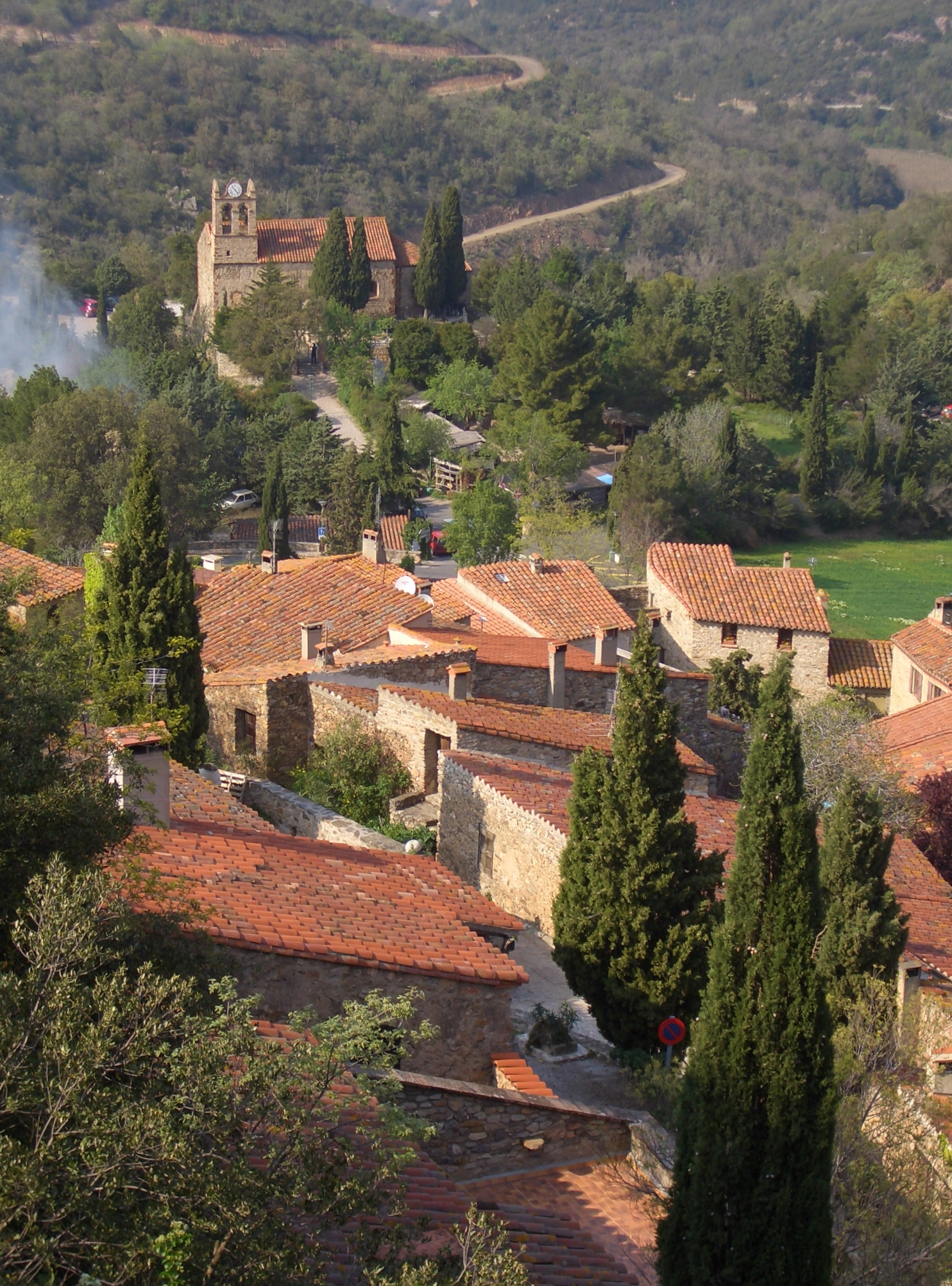
The village seen from the castle

== See also ==
- Communes of the Pyrénées-Orientales department
