= Aleksandr Ogorodnik =

Soviet diplomat and CIA spy

- Александр Дмитриевич Огородник
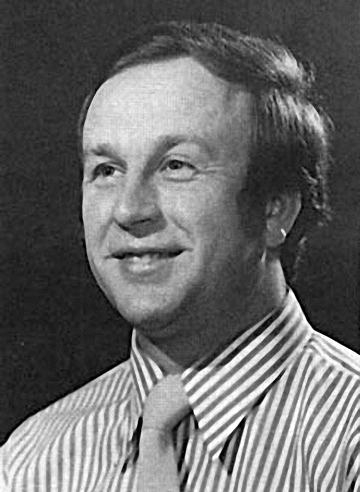
- Ogorodnik c. 1973
- Born: Aleksandr Dmitrievich Ogorodnik; November 11, 1939; Sevastopol, Soviet Union
- Died: June 22, 1977 (aged 37); Moscow, Soviet Union
- Cause of death: Suicide by cyanide poisoning
- Burial place: Khovanskoye Cemetery
- Other names: CKTRIGON
- Occupations: Diplomat, spy, naval officer, doctor in Economy
- Children: Alejandra Suárez Barcala

Aleksandr Dmitrievich Ogorodnik (Russian: Александр Дмитриевич Огородник; November 11, 1939 – June 22, 1977) was a Soviet diplomat who, while stationed in Bogotá, was contacted by the Colombian Administrative Department of Security and the U.S. Central Intelligence Agency to spy on the Soviet Union, operating under the code name TRIGON.

He initially showed little promise and claimed he knew only of Colombian political affairs. He was later transferred to the Soviet Foreign Ministry in Moscow. In this new position, he was able to photograph a great deal of secret diplomatic cables, many of which were sent daily to the White House.

Ogorodnik eventually requested a suicide pill to be used in the event that he was caught. His chief CIA handler in Bogotá, KGB double agent Aldrich Ames, was able to supply him with one. However, Ogorodnik threw away the first pen containing the L-pill (lethal pill) and asked for the CIA to provide him with another pen. After much discussion in the CIA headquarters regarding this request, it was eventually approved and his Moscow handler, Martha Peterson, delivered the pen through a dead drop.

Ogorodnik's espionage activity was revealed to the KGB by Karl Koecher, a Czechoslovak double-agent working as a translator for the CIA, and he was arrested in 1977. During his interrogation, Ogorodnik offered to write a full confession and asked for his pen. When the interrogator handed him the pen with the hidden cyanide pill in the cap, Ogorodnik bit on it and died soon after. He was said to have died before he hit the floor.

He died without knowing the existence of his daughter, Alejandra Suárez Barcala, who was born from his romance in Bogotá with a Spanish woman, Pilar Suárez Barcala, who helped the CIA in Ogorodnik's recruitment.

== Bibliography ==
- Earley, P. (1998). Confessions of a Spy: The Real Story of Aldrich Ames. London: Penguin. ISBN 9780425167120.
- Peterson, M. (2012). The Widow Spy. Wilmington: Red Canary Press. ISBN 9780983878124.
- Suarez Barcala, Alejandra. Nombre en clave: Trigon (in Spanish). Madrid: Punto de Vista Editores. ISBN 9788416876600.
- Hofmann, Domini (2016). Trigon: The KGB Chess Game. All3Media America. https://www.imdb.com/title/tt5748910/
