= Château de Castelnou =

French medieval castle

Coordinates: 42°37′8″N 2°42′10″E

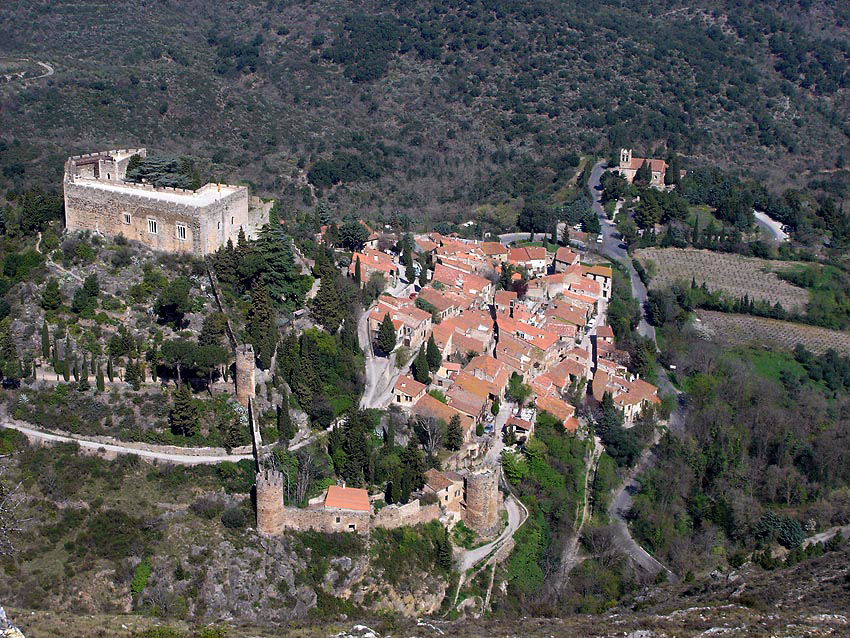
Castelnou: village and castle

The Château de Castelnou (also called the Château Vicomtal) is a medieval castle in the commune of Castelnou (Catalan: Castellnou dels Aspres) in the French département of Pyrénées-Orientales.

The village of Castelnou takes its name from the castle. The Latin castellum novum became in Catalan castell nou, the "new castle".

== History ==
From 990, the castle served as the administrative and military capital of the Viscount of Vallespir. Its irregular pentagonal plan follows the rocky outcrop on which it was built, this elevated position providing defence against enemy attacks.

The castle was taken by the troops of James II of Majorca in 1286, and again in 1483. Largely demolished in 1559, it was no longer restored or inhabited and deteriorated throughout the 17th and 18th centuries. At the time of the French Revolution it became the property of the commune. It was sold to Viscount Satgé in 1875 and, by 1900, had become again an elegant and habitable fortress. It was acquired in 1946 by Charles-Emmanuel Brousse who was married to Amy Elizabeth Thorpe, a famed spy who worked for Britain's MI6 during World War II. Ravaged by a fire that killed Brousse in 1972, in 1987 it was sold and has since been restored.

== See also ==
List of castles in France
