= Martha Peterson =

CIA operations officer

- Born: Martha Jane Denny; May 27, 1945 (age 81); Kansas City, Missouri, U.S.
- Education: Drew University
- Occupation: CIA officer
- Years active: 1973–2003
- Known for: Trigon mission
- Notable work: The Widow Spy
- Spouses: John Peterson (m. 1969; died 1972) Stephen J. Shogi (m. 1978; died 2010) Thomas Dewi Rowlands (m. 2011; died 2019)
- Children: 2
- Website: widowspy.com

Martha Jane "Marti" Peterson (née Denny; born May 27, 1945), now known as Martha Peterson Shogi, is a former operations officer of the United States Central Intelligence Agency (CIA) known for her role in the TRIGON mission.

== Early life and education ==
Peterson was born Martha Jane Denny, on May 27, 1945, the daughter of Riley and Dorothy Denny. Although she was born in Kansas City, Missouri, she grew up in Darien, Connecticut, with her sister, Mary Alice. She graduated from Darien High School in 1963 and Drew University in 1967.

== Career ==
Peterson joined the CIA in July 1973. After learning Russian, she was the first female officer sent to work in the Soviet Union in Moscow. From November 1975 on, her official job at the embassy was an administrative clerk in the consular department, dealing with visa and passport issues. In her covert role, she was responsible for keeping contact via dead drops with Aleksandr Dmitrievich Ogorodnik, code named TRIGON, who had been recruited while working in South America. Ogorodnik was compromised and arrested by the KGB in summer 1977 and committed suicide during interrogation with a covert L-pill in his pen. Peterson, still not under suspicion of being an active CIA officer, was arrested a few weeks later while placing a dead drop for him. She was interrogated at the Lubyanka and expelled from the Soviet Union the next day. Peterson retired from the CIA in 2003. She wrote a book about some of her experience in the CIA, entitled, The Widow Spy.

== Personal life ==
Peterson met her first husband, John Peterson, during her first week of college. They married in 1969. Between 1967 and 1969, he served as Green Beret in Vietnam, and later became a CIA officer. He was killed during an assignment in Laos in a helicopter crash on October 19, 1972. On November 23, 1978, she married her second husband, State Department official Stephen Joseph Shogi. They have a son, Tyler, and a daughter, Lora. She subsequently married Thomas Dewi Rowlands (1939–2019), a Welsh-born aeronautical engineer, in 2011. The two met in the early 2000s, while they were both working for the charity Habitat for Humanity in Wilmington, North Carolina. Rowlands died on June 20, 2019, from age-related illnesses.
