= Bernard Boursicot =

French diplomat (born 1944)

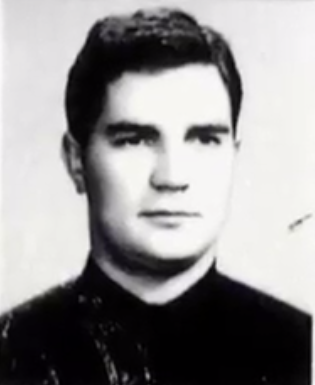
- Boursicot's passport photo circa 1960
- Born: 12 August 1944 (age 82)
- Occupation: Diplomat
- Partners: Shi Pei Pu (beginning 1964); Thierry Toulet (beginning 1974)
- Children: Shi Dudu (Bertrand)

Bernard Boursicot (born 12 August 1944) is a French diplomat who was caught in a Chinese honeypot trap (seducing him to participate in espionage) by Shi Pei Pu, a male Peking opera singer who performed female roles, whom Boursicot claimed he believed to be female. This espionage case became something of a cause célèbre in France in 1986, as Boursicot and Shi were brought to trial, owing to the nature of the unusual sexual subterfuge alleged.

The case was again back under a public spotlight when a play loosely based on this affair, M. Butterfly by David Henry Hwang, premiered in 1988 and yet again as the film adaptation of the play directed by David Cronenberg was released in 1993. Periodic restagings of the play and television airings of the film based on it continue to spark interest in the espionage case at the heart of the fictional works of art.

== Early life ==
Boursicot was born in 1944. He attended boarding schools as a youth, where he engaged in multiple homosexual affairs with other students; upon graduation, Boursicot became determined to have sex with a woman for the first time, believing that institutionalized homosexuality among boarding students was merely a rite of passage.

== Relationship with Shi ==
Boursicot first met Shi Pei Pu in China while posted to the French Embassy in Peking as an accountant in 1964. They met at a party just before Christmas held by Claude Chayet at the French Embassy and shortly began a relationship. Reporter Joyce Wadler, who wrote the book Liaison about the affair, would later attribute Boursicot's belief that Shi was a woman to Shi's unique ability to retract his own testicles, which, combined with the manipulation of his own penis, created the illusion of labial lips and a clitoris and allowed for shallow penetration.

In 1965, Shi claimed to be pregnant and was able to use a baby boy called Shi Du Du (later called Bertrand by Boursicot and his family), who had been bought from a doctor in Xinjiang, and was a Uyghur. Boursicot believed he was a mixed-race Chinese and French, and that there was a family resemblance between him and the boy.

Over the next decade, they continued their on-again off-again affair as Boursicot moved from posting to posting in Southeast Asia. During this period Boursicot embraced his own bisexuality, having multiple liaisons with women while also engaged in a long-term relationship with a Frenchman named Thierry, with whom he one day hoped to form a family including Shi Pei Pu and Bertrand. Boursicot has stated that he began passing documents to Shi when the Chinese Cultural Revolution made it difficult for him to see him. He was approached by a member of the Chinese secret service, "Kang", who offered him access to Shi in exchange for his passing documents. He believed Shi's safety was at risk if he failed to participate.

== Return to France, trial and aftermath ==
Boursicot returned to France in 1979 and lost contact with Shi. In 1982, Boursicot was able to get the now 16-year-old Shi Du Du out of China and to Paris, where they lived as a family. Boursicot was questioned by authorities and confessed to having passed at least 150 classified documents to Shi. In 1983, Boursicot and Shi Pei Pu were arrested for spying for China. The prosecution then dramatically revealed Shi's real sex to Boursicot. He refused to believe it until he was permitted to see proof in the form of Shi's body. Not long after, he attempted suicide while in prison but was unsuccessful. In 1986, after a two-day trial, Boursicot and Shi were convicted of spying against the French government. Each received a sentence of six years in prison.

Shi was pardoned in 1987. After his release, Shi remained in Paris, where he enjoyed his notoriety and performed as an opera singer. Boursicot, released four months after Shi, was last reported to be living contentedly with Thierry and has apparently made peace with the nature of his relationship with Shi. Shi Pei Pu and Shi Du Du had no contact with Boursicot until Shi's death in 2009. In Shi's obituary, it was reported that Shi Du Du was living in Paris and believed by Boursicot to have a family with three sons.

== Cooperation with Joyce Wadler, author of Liaison ==
Boursicot cooperated fully with reporter Joyce Wadler, who was seeking information for her book on the espionage case and affair, Liaison, granting her lengthy interviews about deeply personal subjects as well as access to all records and his closest family members. He is frequently quoted in the book.

In a separate but lengthy article published in The New York Times Magazine in 1993, titled "The True Story of M. Butterfly; The Spy Who Fell in Love with a Shadow", Wadler reveals in intimate detail how Boursicot came to believe the fiction that Shi Pei Pu was a woman despite having first come to know him socially and in a close friendship as a man.

Boursicot related through Wadler that Shi first told him the story of an opera about a Chinese girl who swaps clothing with her brother so she may be educated. She falls in love with another student but is called home to participate in an arranged marriage. The male student is driven to suicide and eventually the girl does the same at the grave of her true love. The opera is called the Story of the Butterfly.

Boursicot reported that it is only when he had the opportunity to leave his dull job that Shi Pei Pu told him the Story of the Butterfly again with an added twist that he, Shi Pei Pu, had been a woman masquerading as a man all his life to prevent her father from taking a second wife and shaming her mother who had two older daughters. Upon Shi's birth, this fiction was created. Boursicot accepted the lie, their affair began, and all that came after ensued.

== Boursicot's and Shi's public comments regarding their affair ==
In his obituary, it was reported that Shi Pei Pu disliked answering questions about the sexual specifics of the affair; in 1988 he was quoted in an interview as having said, "I used to fascinate both men and women. What I was and what they were didn't matter."

About the affair, Boursicot is quoted as saying, "When I believed it, it was a beautiful story." However, when Boursicot was notified at a French nursing home of Shi's death, Boursicot said, "He did so many things against me that he had no pity for, I think it is stupid to play another game now and say I am sad. The plate is clean now. I am free."

== Legacy of the affair and espionage case ==
- The play M. Butterfly by David Henry Hwang is based on this affair. This became the basis of the film of the same name directed by David Cronenberg.
- The contemporary Chinese Music Theatre Mr. Shi and His Lover by Njo Kong Kie and Wong Teng Chi is based on this affair.

== See also ==
- Chevalière d'Éon
