= Red Sparrow (novel) =

Novel by Jason Matthew

- First edition
- Author: Jason Matthews
- Genre: Spy fiction, mystery, thriller
- Published: 2013
- Publisher: Scribner
- Pages: 434
- Awards: Edgar Award for Best First Novel by an American Author (2014); ITW Thriller Award for Best First Novel (2014)
- ISBN: 978-1-476-70612-2
- Followed by: Palace of Treason; The Kremlin's Candidate
- Website: Red Sparrow

Red Sparrow is a novel written by Jason Matthews, a former Central Intelligence Agency (CIA) operative, published by Scribner, on June 4, 2013. The book describes the mundane aspects of the intelligence field, the techniques it employs, and Red Sparrow's unique ability to discern the nature of people by seeing their emotions in colors (through synesthesia).

== Synopsis ==
Dominika Egorova, or "Red Sparrow,” is a former Russian ballerina who is forced, by her uncle, Colonel Egorov, to undergo espionage training for the Russian government at the Sparrow School, where people are trained to seduce their targets. Other key figures are Marble, a Russian double agent who provides intelligence to the CIA, and Nate Nash, a CIA internal-ops officer who recruits and handles intelligence assets for the agency. Each chapter, in the book, as well as its two sequels, includes a reference to a specific prepared food and ends with a recipe for it.

== Reception ==
James Burridge and Michael Bradford, reviewing the book for the CIA's website, praised the novel for its authentic depiction of surveillance and countersurveillance techniques, calling it "accurate [and] richly detailed,” and positively comparing the book's plausibility to the work of John le Carré. Burridge and Bradford also praised the characters as having been richly drawn, and for the avoidance of clichés, though they felt that the Russian supporting characters were not as nuanced as their American counterparts. The reviewers noted the distracting nature of the recipes, at the end of each chapter, saying they could be easily skipped, and they cautioned readers about the most explicit sex scenes they had ever encountered in the espionage genre.

In 2014, the book won two literary awards, ITW Thriller Award for Best First Novel and the Edgar Award for Best First Novel by an American Author. The Washington Post says of Matthews's skill as a writer, "Sly descriptions abound, from the 'poached-egg eye' of a Russian assassin to the 'grimy catechisms' of those Sparrow School lessons. And despite a tendency toward point-of-view whiplash shifts, the author inhabits voices and perspectives with an impressionist's aplomb, whether the rich patter of a CIA agent recounting an Istanbul adventure or those dry reports in the 'abbreviated style of the semiliterate Soviet'."

== Sequels and film ==
Before the book was published, Matthews sold the movie rights for Red Sparrow, for a seven-figure amount. He was also awarded a contract for a sequel to the book. The sequel, named Palace of Treason, was published, in 2015. He also wrote a third volume, named The Kremlin's Candidate, in 2018.

A film adaptation of Red Sparrow was released, in 2018, starring Jennifer Lawrence and Joel Edgerton.
