= Jason Matthews (novelist) =

American novelist (1951–2021)

- Born: September 17, 1951; Hartford, Connecticut, United States
- Died: April 28, 2021 (aged 69)
- Occupations: novelist, former CIA officer
- Known for: author of espionage novels
- Notable work: Red Sparrow spy novel trilogy
- Awards: International Thriller Writers Awards, Edgar Allan Poe Award for Best First Novel

Jason Matthews (September 17, 1951 – April 28, 2021) was an American author of espionage novels and a former CIA officer, best known for the Red Sparrow spy novel trilogy.

== Biography ==
Matthews was born September 17, 1951, in Hartford, Connecticut. He worked for the Central Intelligence Agency for three decades, where he met his wife, Suzanne, also a former CIA officer. He died April 28, 2021 at the age of 69 from corticobasal degeneration.

== Career ==
Prior to becoming a novelist, Matthews spent 33 years working for the CIA. While in the CIA, he was officially a diplomat, in Europe, Asia, and the Caribbean, but his real job was recruiting and then managing foreign agents.

In 2014, his first novel, Red Sparrow (2013), won an Edgar Award for Best First Novel by an American author. Writer and critic Art Taylor praised it, in The Washington Post, writing that it "isn't just a fast-paced thriller—it's a first-rate novel, as noteworthy for its superior style as for its gripping depiction of a secretive world." It was adapted into a movie of the same name starring Jennifer Lawrence.

In 2015 and 2018, he published Palace of Treason and The Kremlin’s Candidate, which are the sequels to Red Sparrow.

== Works ==
=== Red Sparrow trilogy ===
- Matthews, Jason (2013). Red Sparrow. Simon and Schuster. ISBN 978-1-4711-1261-4.
- ——— (2015). Palace of Treason. Simon and Schuster. ISBN 978-1-4767-9375-7.
- ——— (2018). The Kremlin's Candidate. Penguin Books, Limited. ISBN 978-1-4059-2085-8.

== Awards ==
- 2014 ITW Thriller Award for Best First Novel, for Red Sparrow
- 2014 Edgar Award for Best First Novel, for Red Sparrow
