= Shi Pei Pu =

Chinese spy and opera singer (1938–2009)

- Born: 21 December 1938; Shandong, Republic of China
- Died: 30 June 2009 (aged 70); Paris, France
- Education: Yunnan University (University of Kunming)
- Occupations: Opera singer, spy
- Partner: Bernard Boursicot
- Children: Shi Du Du

Chinese name
- Traditional Chinese: 時佩璞
- Simplified Chinese: 时佩璞
Transcriptions
Standard Mandarin
- Hanyu Pinyin: Shí Pèipú
- Gwoyeu Romatzyh: Shyr Peypwu
- Wade–Giles: Shih P'eip'u
- IPA: [ʂɻ̩̌ pʰêɪpʰǔ]

Shi Pei Pu (Chinese: 时佩璞; pinyin: Shí Pèipú; 21 December 1938 – 30 June 2009) was a Chinese opera singer and spy for the People's Republic of China. He obtained classified information from Bernard Boursicot, an employee at the French embassy, during a 20-year sexual relationship in which he convinced Boursicot that he was a woman. Shi also claimed to have a child, a Uyghur boy whom he insisted was the result of their relationship. The case drew significant media attention in France when the true circumstances were revealed.

The affair inspired American playwright David Henry Hwang's M. Butterfly (1988), which was produced on Broadway and was adapted into the 1993 film of the same title.

== Early life ==
Shi's father was a college professor, and his mother was a teacher. He had two sisters who were significantly older than he was. Shi grew up in Kunming in the southwestern province of Yunnan, where he learned French and attended Yunnan University, graduating with a literature degree. By age 17, Shi had become an actor and singer who had achieved some recognition. In his 20s, Shi wrote plays and operas about workers.

== The "French Dip Affair" (Relationship with Boursicot) ==
Bernard Boursicot was born in France and was hired at the age of 20 as an accountant at the French embassy in Beijing. It opened in 1964 as the first Western mission in China since the Korean War. As recorded in his diary, Boursicot had previously had sexual relations only with fellow male students in school and wanted to meet a woman and fall in love. He first met Shi, then 26 years old, at a Christmas party in December 1964; the performer was dressed as a man. Shi had been teaching Chinese to families of embassy workers. He told Boursicot that he was "a female Beijing opera singer who had been forced to live as a man to satisfy his father's wish to have a son". The two quickly developed a secret sexual relationship, maintained in the dark, which allowed Shi to convince Boursicot that he was a woman.

After being discovered by the Chinese government, Boursicot was pressured into providing secret documents from his postings in Beijing from 1969 to 1972 and in Ulaanbaatar, Mongolia, from 1977 to 1979. He took more than 500 documents. When Boursicot was stationed outside of China, he saw Shi infrequently, but they maintained their sexual relationship. Shi later showed Shi Du Du (时度度), a four-year-old child that Shi insisted was their son, to Boursicot.

Shi and his adopted son were brought to Paris in 1982, after Boursicot was able to arrange for them to enter France. Boursicot was arrested by French authorities on 30 June 1983, and Shi was arrested shortly thereafter. In police custody, Shi explained to doctors how he had hidden his genitals to convince Boursicot that he was a woman. As the French doctors sent to examine Shi discovered, Shi could create the appearance of having female genitalia by making his testicles ascend into his body cavity and tucking his penis back. Shi said that their purported son was a Uyghur from China's Xinjiang Province who was sold by his mother and adopted by Shi. Upon discovering the truth of their relationship, Boursicot attempted suicide by slitting his throat but survived. The public disclosure of the long-term affair made Boursicot the subject of widespread ridicule in France.

== Sentence ==
Shi and Boursicot were each convicted of espionage in 1986 and sentenced to six years in prison. Shi was pardoned by President of France François Mitterrand on 10 April 1987, as part of an effort to defuse tensions between France and China over what was described as a "very silly" and unimportant case. Boursicot was pardoned in August of that year.

The affair inspired David Henry Hwang's 1988 play M. Butterfly. BD Wong played Song Liling, a Chinese opera singer and spy based on Shi Pei Pu, in the original Broadway production of the play.

== Last years and death ==
After his pardon, Shi returned to performing as an opera singer. He was reluctant to share the details of his relationship with Boursicot, stating that he "used to fascinate both men and women" and that "What I was and what they were didn't matter." Shi spoke infrequently with Boursicot over the subsequent years. However, in the months before Shi's death, he told Boursicot that he still loved him.

Shi was said to be 70 years old when he died on 30 June 2009, in Paris. Shi is survived by his adopted son, Shi Du Du, who later fathered three sons of his own. Notified at a French nursing home of Shi's death, Boursicot said, "He did so many things against me that he had no pity for; I think it is stupid to play another game now and say I am sad. The plate is clean now. I am free."
