= M. Butterfly =

1988 play by David Henry Hwang

- Original language: English
- Written by: David Henry Hwang
- Characters: Rene Gallimard; Song Liling; Marc; Helga; M. Toulon; Comrade Chin; Renee and others
- Subject: East/West cultural stereotypes
- Genre: Drama
- Setting: A Paris prison, 1988; recollections of Beijing and Paris

Premiere
- Date: February 10, 1988
- Place: National Theatre, Washington, D.C.

M. Butterfly is a play by David Henry Hwang. The story is inspired by the opera Madama Butterfly and on the real-life relationship between French diplomat Bernard Boursicot and Shi Pei Pu, a Beijing opera singer. The play premiered on Broadway in 1988 and won the 1988 Tony Award for Best Play. In addition, it was a Pulitzer Prize for Drama finalist in 1989.

== Productions ==
M. Butterfly premiered at the National Theatre, Washington, DC, on February 10, 1988.

The play opened on Broadway at the Eugene O'Neill Theatre on March 20, 1988, and closed after 777 performances on January 27, 1990. It was produced by Stuart Ostrow and directed by John Dexter; it starred John Lithgow as Gallimard and BD Wong as Song Liling. David Dukes, Anthony Hopkins, Tony Randall, and John Rubinstein played Gallimard at various times during the original run. Alec Mapa was also B.D. Wong's understudy and was eventually cast to replace B. D. Wong for the role of Song Liling in the Broadway production of the play.

The play was a 1989 finalist for the Pulitzer Prize for Drama.

A production of M. Butterfly ran in Moscow, Russia from 1990 to 1992, directed by Roman Viktyuk. It had a highly unusual abstract staging, featuring the original opera Madame Butterfly intermixed with French pop music. Kazakh countertenor Erik Kurmangaliev starred as Song; he also sang two of Butterfly's arias live during the show.

It is published by Plume and in an acting edition by Dramatists Play Service. An audio recording of the play was produced by L.A. Theatre Works, with Lithgow and Wong reprising their Broadway roles along with Margaret Cho.

A Broadway revival opened on October 26, 2017, at the Cort Theatre, with previews beginning on October 7. Starring Clive Owen and Jin Ha, the production was directed by Julie Taymor. David Henry Hwang made changes to the original text for the revival, mostly centering on the issue of intersectional identities, but also for clarifications.

== Plot ==
The first act introduces the main character, René Gallimard, a civil servant attached to the French embassy in China. In a prison, Gallimard is serving a sentence for treason. Through a series of flashbacks and imagined conversations, Gallimard tells an audience his story about a woman that he loved and lost. He falls in love with a beautiful Chinese opera singer, Song Liling. Gallimard is unaware that all female roles in traditional Beijing opera were actually played by men, as women were banned from the stage. The first act ends with Gallimard returning to France in shame and living alone after he asks his wife, Helga, for a divorce, admitting to her that he's had a mistress.

It is revealed in act 2 that Song had been acting as a spy for the Chinese government, and she is actually a man who has disguised himself as a woman to seduce Gallimard and extract information from him. They stay together for 20 years until the truth is revealed, and Gallimard is convicted of treason and imprisoned. Unable to face the fact that his "perfect woman" is a man, he retreats deep within himself and his memories. The action of the play is depicted as his disordered, distorted recollection of the events surrounding their affair.

In act three, Song reveals himself to the audience as a man, without makeup and dressed in men's clothing. Gallimard claims he only loved the idea of Butterfly, never Song himself. Gallimard throws Song and his clothing off the stage, but holds onto Butterfly's kimono. In scene three, the setting returns to Gallimard's prison cell, as he puts on makeup and Butterfly's wig and kimono. Then he stabs himself, committing suicide just as Butterfly does in the opera.

=== Changes for the 2017 Broadway revival ===
For the Julie Taymor–directed revival in 2017, Hwang revisited the text to incorporate further information that had emerged about the Boursicot case, and address intersectional identities. Taymor and Hwang wanted their new approach to consider “present public discussion and awareness of nonbinary genders, the growth of China as a superpower, and details about the true story. . . which were not available to Hwang when he wrote the first version.”

Changes include

- Song Liling initially presents as male to Gallimard, only to claim to be physically female but made to dress up as a man by her parents.
  - Hwang noted in an interview that the surprise reveal that Song Liling is actually a man no longer carried the shock value it did in 1988, especially after The Crying Game used the same tactic only a few years later.
- The play is changed to a two-act structure.
- Act 1 ends with Song telling Gallimard that she is pregnant (this moment originally occurred during Act 2).
- Further information on how Song Liling managed to mislead Gallimard even while they were intimate.

One reviewer said “in this incarnation, we’re not being seduced, but preached at.” Another said it “was neither a critical nor a popular success…[but] an important, timely, and productive reconsideration of the play and its story in light of new acceptances of gender fluidity and the changing balance of power between Asia and the West.”

The 2019 production at South Coast Repertory used the 2017 revival as its source material. Directed by Desdemona Chiang, Lucas Verbrugghe and Jake Manabat performed as leads. One reviewer said the story “has taken on new resonance in an era shaped by the MeToo movement, China’s geopolitical might and a more widespread understanding of gender identity issues.” Regarding the long-debated questions of Song and Gallimard's intimate relations, another reviewer said “Song’s defiant explanation to an over-curious French judge struck me as Hwang wanting to put an end to the prying once and for all.”

== Film adaptation ==
Hwang adapted the play for a 1993 film directed by David Cronenberg with Jeremy Irons and John Lone in the leading roles.

== Opera adaptation ==
In July 2022, an opera adaptation ran at the Santa Fe Opera House after being delayed for two years by the COVID-19 pandemic. It was directed by James Robinson and composed by Huang Ruo, with a libretto by Hwang. The leads were played by Mark Stone and Kangmin Justin Kim. David Allen of the New York Times expressed mixed feelings about the performance, questioning the longevity and adaptability of M. Butterfly in a world of continuously evolving attitudes. The production also played for one night at the Barbican Centre in London in October 2024 with Mark Stone and Kangmin Justin Kim reprising their roles, re-staged by Kimberley S Prescott. This performance was a co-production between the Barbican and the BBC Symphony Orchestra; and performed as a staged concert. The performance was recorded by BBC Radio 3 for a deferred broadcast.

== Reception ==
Subhash Kak describes the interplay between the 1904 Madame Butterfly and 1988 M. Butterfly saying that Gallimard "falls in love, not with a person, but an imagined stereotype. His Chinese lover, Song Liling, encourages this stereotype, playing the role of the Oriental woman as demure and submissive. Gallimard, who had thought of himself as the macho Pinkerton, husband of the beautiful and fragile Butterfly." KBPS described the latter as an inversion of the former: "here, it is the Occidental man who becomes the Butterfly: submissive, easily trapped, and ultimately destroyed."

In a 1988 New York Times review, John Gross called M. Butterfly "very well worth seeing" due to its "tense emotional drama", and especially praised Wong's performance. However, he criticized the play's attempt to draw a parallel between the main characters' relationship and international relations, with the West portrayed as the masculine aggressor and "the East as feminine victim". Gross stated that the play's depiction of Chinese government atrocities during the Cultural Revolution contradicts this narrative, rendering the play "a mess, intellectually speaking".

=== Relevance to the LGBT community ===
In an interview with David Henry Hwang, the playwright states: “The lines between gay and straight become very blurred in this play, but I think he knows he's having an affair with a man. Therefore, on some level he is gay.”

In a 2014 review for the Windy City Times, Jonathan Abarbanel states that Song Liling “may be gay but it's a secondary point raised only as a way by which Chinese government agents can control him. As an exploration of sexuality, it's about the Divine Androgyne who Song Liling may recognize and exploit, and which Gallimard certainly recognizes and embraces in the play's closing moments.”

The Washington Blade refers to Gallimard as “a gay man who couldn’t be himself. He had to mask behind male bravado, cultural and religious dicta, and diplomatic constraints. But he was willing to overlook and deny everything in pursuit of love.”

Hwang talked to several people with nonconforming gender identities to get better insight into the character of Song, but he ultimately stressed that the character is not transgender. “He recognized how Song might be differently received by a modern audience more savvy about the wide spectrum of gender identity.”

Ilka Saal writes: “The playwright uses the figure of the transvestite to lay bare the construction and performativity of gender and culture. Yet he stops short of questioning compulsory heterosexuality at its base, and thereby fails to use queer desire in order to open up interstices, categories of 'thirdness,' in this tight homophobic structure.”

In an article for Pride Source, Pruett and Beer state: “Gallimard is a man who thinks he is heterosexual, but is in fact a practicing homosexual for 20 years. Song takes on the role of a woman, but always self-identifies as a gay man, not a transgendered person.”

Christian Lewis, when writing about the 2017 revival, wrote in the Huffington Post that "this production does not explore any foray into non-binary or transgender identities, which is perhaps its one major flaw."

== Awards and nominations ==
=== Original Broadway production ===
Year	Award ceremony	Category	Nominee	Result
1988	Tony Award	Best Play	David Henry Hwang	Won
1988	Tony Award	Best Performance by a Leading Actor in a Play	John Lithgow	Nominated
1988	Tony Award	Best Performance by a Featured Actor in a Play	BD Wong	Won
1988	Tony Award	Best Direction of a Play	John Dexter	Won
1988	Tony Award	Best Scenic Design	Eiko Ishioka	Nominated
1988	Tony Award	Best Costume Design	Eiko Ishioka	Nominated
1988	Tony Award	Best Lighting Design	Andy Phillips	Nominated
1988	Drama Desk Award	Outstanding New Play	David Henry Hwang	Won
1988	Drama Desk Award	Outstanding Actor in a Play	John Lithgow	Nominated
1988	Drama Desk Award	Outstanding Featured Actor in a Play	BD Wong	Won
1988	Drama Desk Award	Outstanding Director of a Play	John Dexter	Won
1988	Drama Desk Award	Outstanding Set Design	Eiko Ishioka	Nominated
1988	Drama Desk Award	Outstanding Costume Design	Eiko Ishioka	Nominated
1988	Outer Critics Circle Award	Outstanding New Broadway Play		Won
1988	Outer Critics Circle Award	Outstanding Debut Performance	BD Wong	Won
1988	Outer Critics Circle Award	John Gassner Award	David Henry Hwang	Won
1988	New York Drama Critics' Circle	Best Play	David Henry Hwang	Nominated
1988	Theatre World Award		BD Wong	Won
1988	Clarence Derwent Awards	Most Promising Male Performer	BD Wong	Won
1989	Pulitzer Prize for Drama			Finalist
